= Vosges Keuperian coal mining basin =

French coal mining basin

Coordinates: 48°N 7°E

Location of the deposit on the map of the coalfields of France.

The Keuperian coal basin of the Vosges is part of the coal basins of the Vosges and Jura. It was mined for coal between the early 19th century and the mid-20th century near the town of Vittel, in the western part of the Vosges department in eastern France. Rock salt, pyrite, and gypsum are other resources extracted from the same geological formation.

Coal was discovered in Norroy in the 1820s. The industry peaked in the 19th century, with six concessions granted between 1829 and 1859 for exploiting the basin. The most active concession was that of Saint-Menge and Gemmelaincourt, where several hundred thousand tons of coal were extracted. This low-quality fuel, due to its high sulfur content, was reserved for local use. During the Occupation, shortages and local needs prompted renewed exploration, particularly by the Bureau of Geological and Geophysical Research (BRGG), following the example of small French coal basins that were not subject to the occupier's quotas.

== Location ==
The department of the Vosges and the various municipalities through which the coalfield runs.

The tattered remains of the coal basin in black.

The coal basin extends across the western part of the Vosges department in the French Grand Est region, near Vittel.

The nearest coal deposits are the Stephanian sub-Vosgian coal basin to the southeast. Another Keuperian basin exists in Haute-Saône, just south of the aforementioned Stephanian basin, less than a hundred kilometers from Vittel.

From the 1830s to the 1850s, the catchment area was limited to the region where the extraction occurred. The coal was used for domestic heating, boiler heating, plaster firing, and the operation of lime kilns and breweries. It was even briefly used for iron puddling, as the iron was not affected by the sulfur content of Norroy coal. However, the excessive amount of ash and its associated constraints led to the discontinuation of this use.

== Geology ==
The deposit belongs to the Keuper (dated between 230 and 220 million years ago) and is one of the coal basins of the Vosges and Jura. This coal can be classified as "recent coal" or as an intermediate form between lignite and bituminous coal. The Practical Guide to Applied Mineralogy by M. Nogues classifies Norroy coal as dry, non-flaming, or short-flame coal. The coal from this deposit has a bright black appearance and leaves a brownish dust after combustion. When submerged in water, it disintegrates easily. The deposit is rich in pyrite, present in very hard nodules or layers that reduce the thickness of the coal seam. Gypsum is also found in the same geological layer, as well as rock salt (Parey-sous-Montfort).

The coal basin contains only a single coal seam. When exploited, the thickness of this seam generally ranges from a few dozen centimeters (15 to 30 cm in the Vacheresse concession, 40 to 80 cm in several locations within the Saint-Menge and Norroy concessions), reaching a maximum of 90 cm to 1 meter. It is sometimes split into two by a layer of oil shale. The depth of the seam does not exceed 30 meters.

The coal vein is often divided into three distinct parts:

- The upper part varies in quality and is sometimes considered poor, often discarded in spoil heaps when it appears dull black. It burns poorly and does not reduce to ash. However, when it is bright black, it is of better quality, burns easily, and leaves white ash.
- The intermediate part has a glossy black appearance and contains more fossil plant debris (freshwater swamp plants, including Calamites and conifer fruits), as well as cellular fragments and roots. After combustion, it leaves reddish-brown ash. This layer is sometimes absent.
- The lower part is vividly black and glossy. This coal burns well, leaving a mixture of red and white ash.

The geological formation follows a northwest–southeast orientation, parallel to the Vosges massif. The coal is found in layers of variegated marls that rest on the Muschelkalk formation. The coal seam generally follows the surface terrain's undulations (multiple hills and valleys). In the Norroy area, the dip of the seam usually varies between 1 and 3 degrees. The deposit is highly faulted, which disrupts mining operations and causes significant water inflows into the mine.

== Concessions ==
=== Norroy concession ===
Work on the Norroy concession.

Coal outcrops were reportedly discovered in 1820 by Abbé Butord, the parish priest of Norroy-sur-Vair and Mandres-sur-Vair, who identified lignite outcrops on the slopes of the Haut de Charmont hill in Norroy. The official discovery of the deposit was made by a mining engineer in 1824, leading to exploration work that continued until 1827. The concession, covering the municipalities of Norroy, Saint-Remimont, Belmont-sur-Vair, and Parey-sous-Montfort, was granted on August 5, 1829, to Muel-Picard and associates.

In 1859, coal extraction in Norroy was carried out using shafts equipped with baritels (manual winding devices), spaced about a hundred meters apart and connected by adits measuring one meter in width and 1.30 meters in height. Coal transport was done using four-wheeled cast-iron carts with a capacity of 750 liters. At the surface, the coal was manually sorted from pyrite and then screened to separate the gaillettes (larger fragments) from the menu (smaller grains). One square meter of extracted material produced 400 kg of sorted coal. Two miners and two haulers could produce 8 to 10 tons of coal in a ten-hour workday. The production cost per ton of coal reached 6.50 francs.

Mining operations were conducted at many successive sites on Charmont hill, with production resuming at different locations after closures. The concession's average annual production was 3,000 tons. Until 1900, the concession belonged to the Marquise d'Estournel before being acquired by the Société des Houillères de Suriauville, which operated the concession of the same name. In 1903, both concessions were acquired by the Société des Mines de Parrey-Chatillon. In 1909, the concession was operated by the Gemmelaincourt company. It was forfeited on June 29, 1923.

Mining remains of the concession

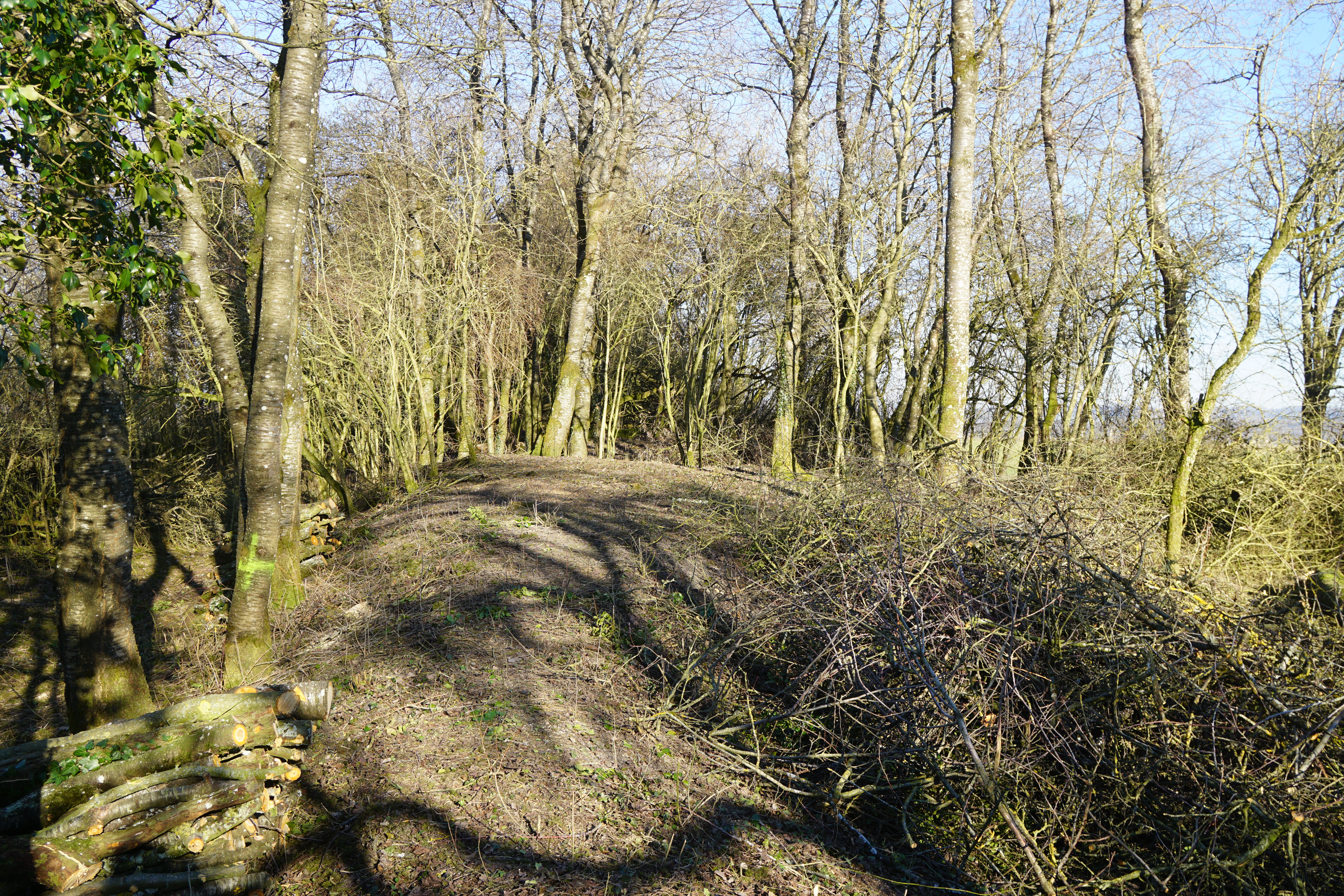
Under the branches, the funnel formed by the central shaft of Charmont.

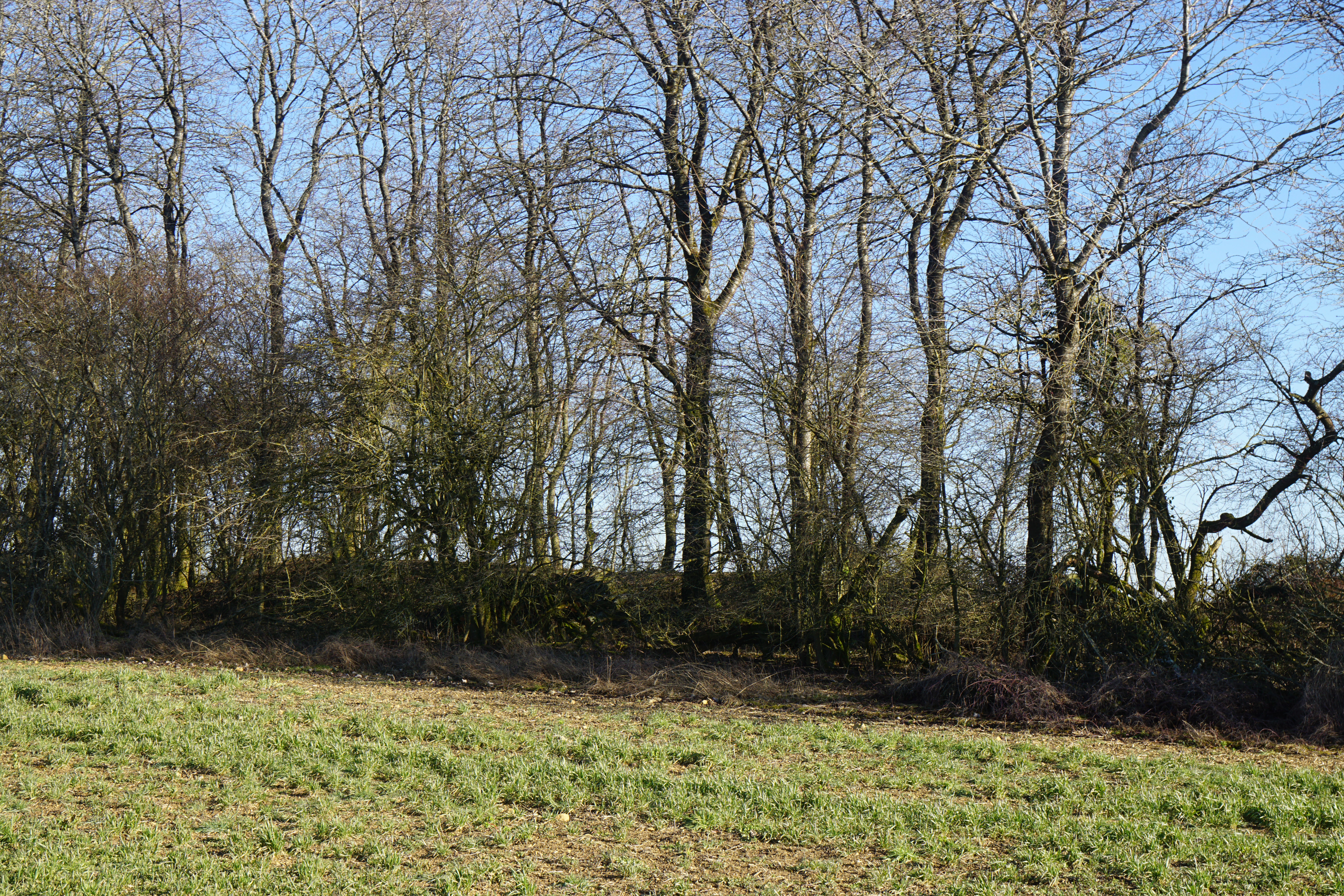
The slag heap of the central shaft of Charmont.

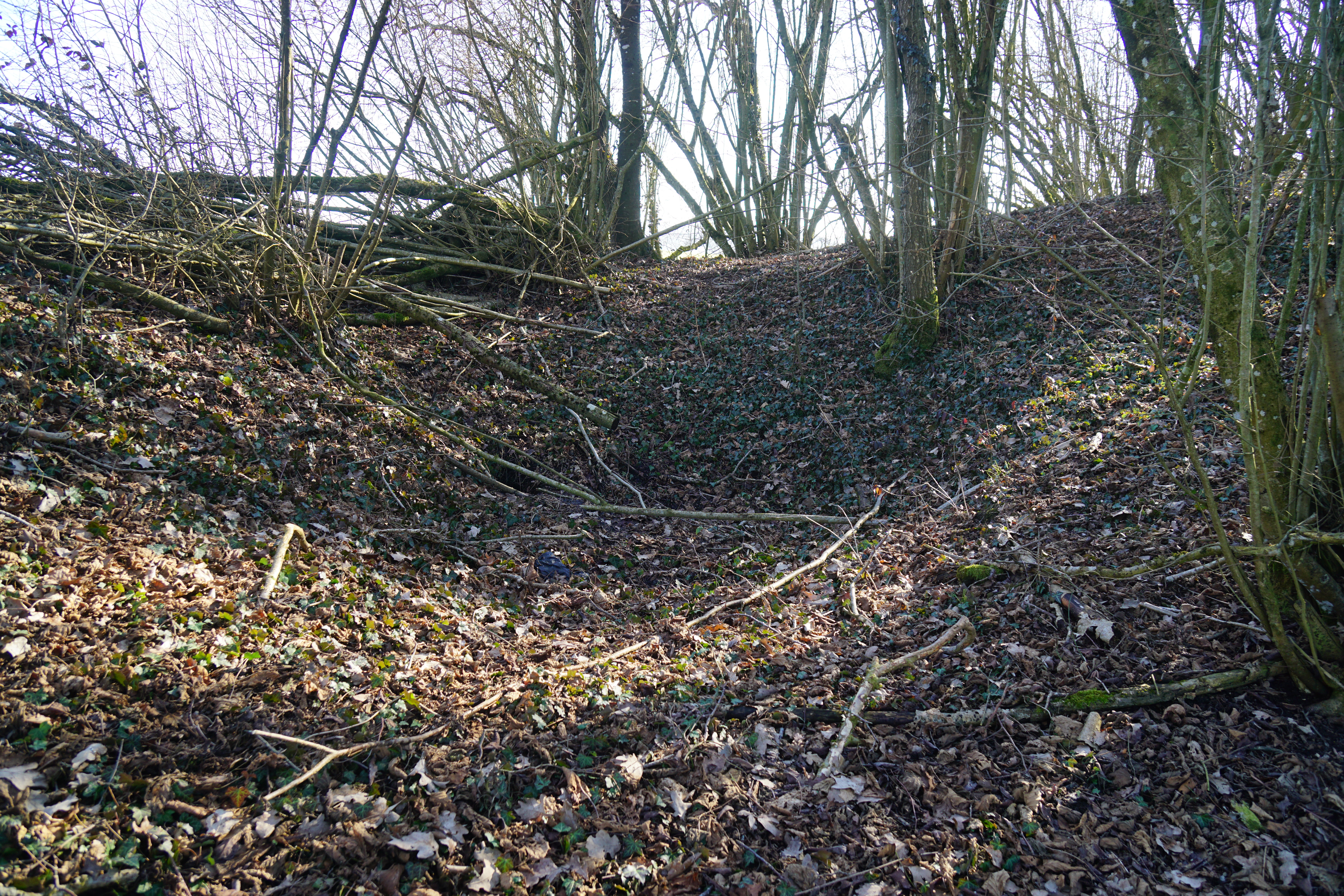
The funnel formed by the north shaft of Charmont.

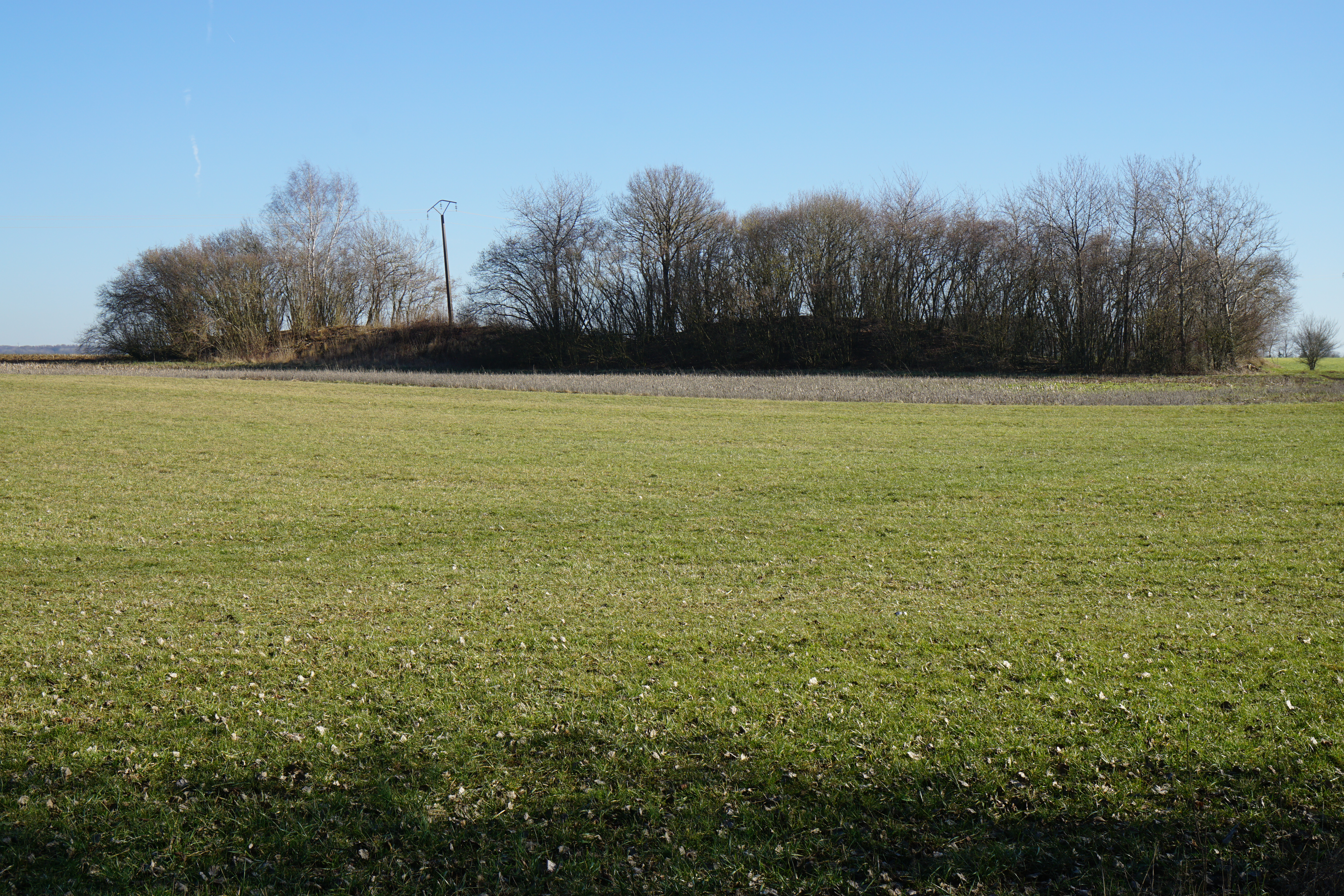
The slag heap of the north shaft of Charmont.

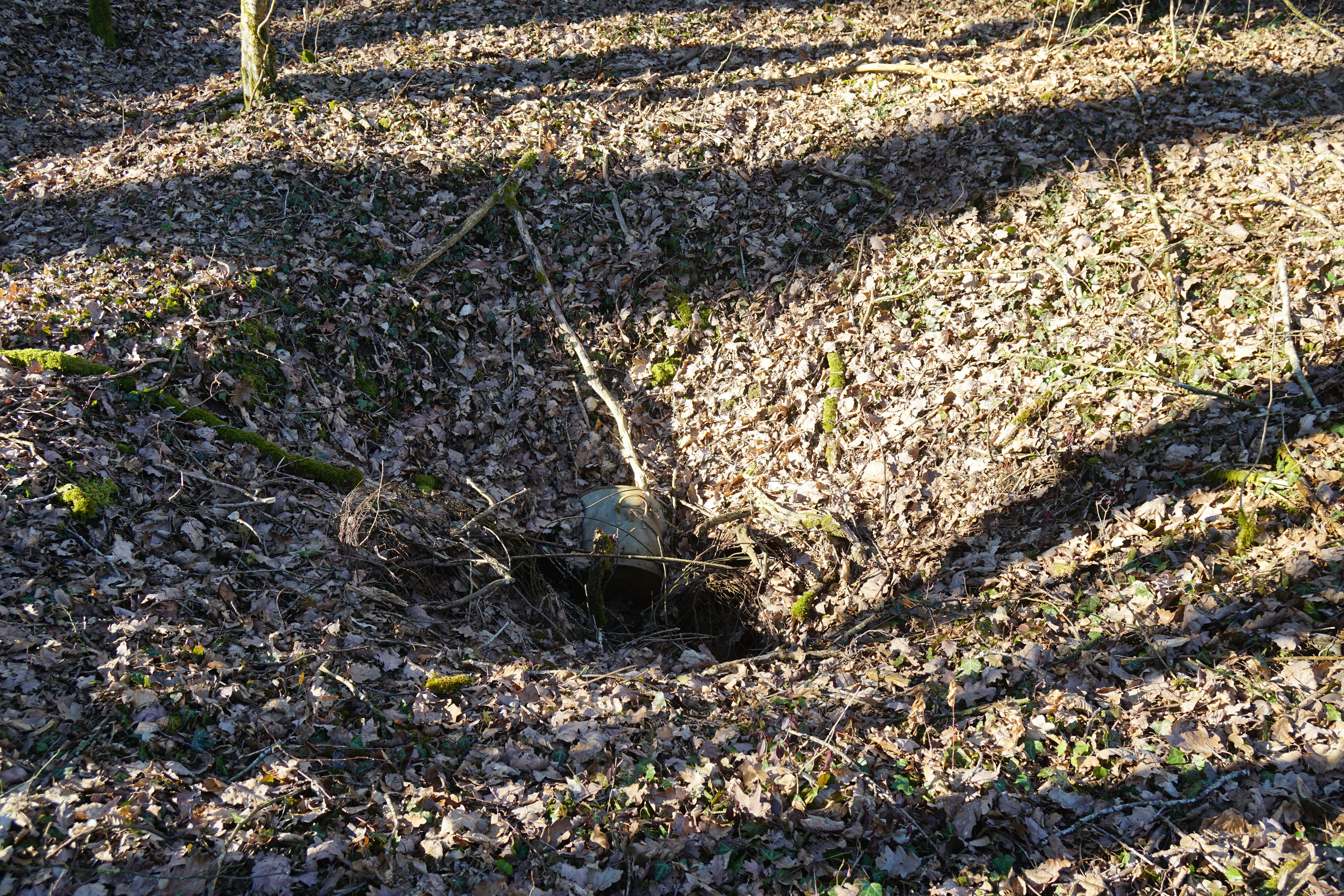
The funnel formed by shaft No^{.} 3.

=== La Vacheresse concession ===
The works on La Vacheresse concession.

Outcrops in this sector were discovered in 1826. Exploration work occurred before 1840 south of the village of Crainvilliers (at the site known as "La Côte-Court") and near La Vacheresse. The concession was granted on August 14, 1842, to Mr. Le Paige and Baron de Saint-Amand. The Crainvilliers mine was operated until 1869. Another mining operation began in 1856 in Martigny-les-Bains, at the site known as "Reberchamp." Activities were suspended between 1875 and 1877. The mine was permanently closed around 1883–1884, and the concession was relinquished on April 28, 1890.

Mining remains of the concession

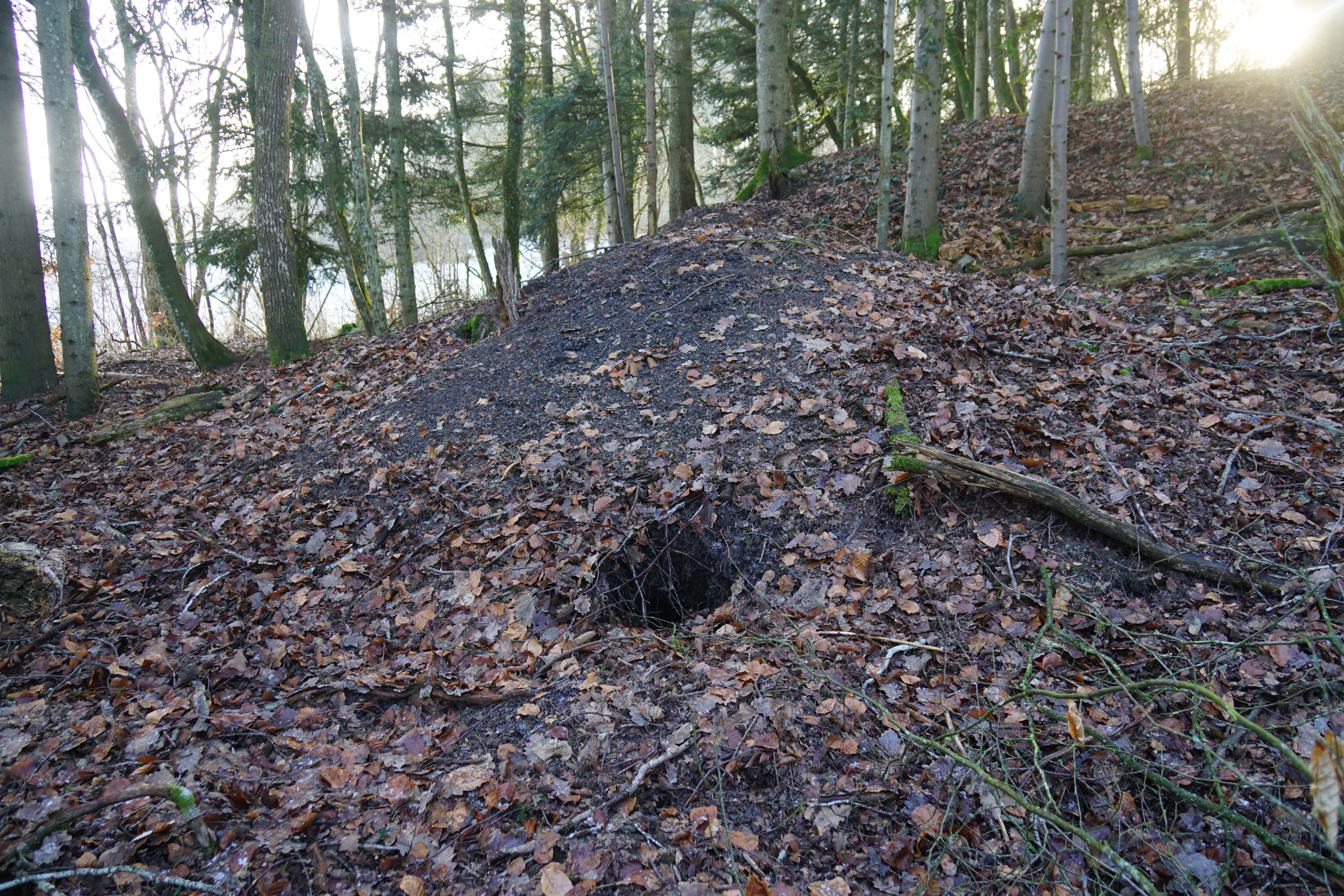
The slag heap of the Saint-Barbe adit.

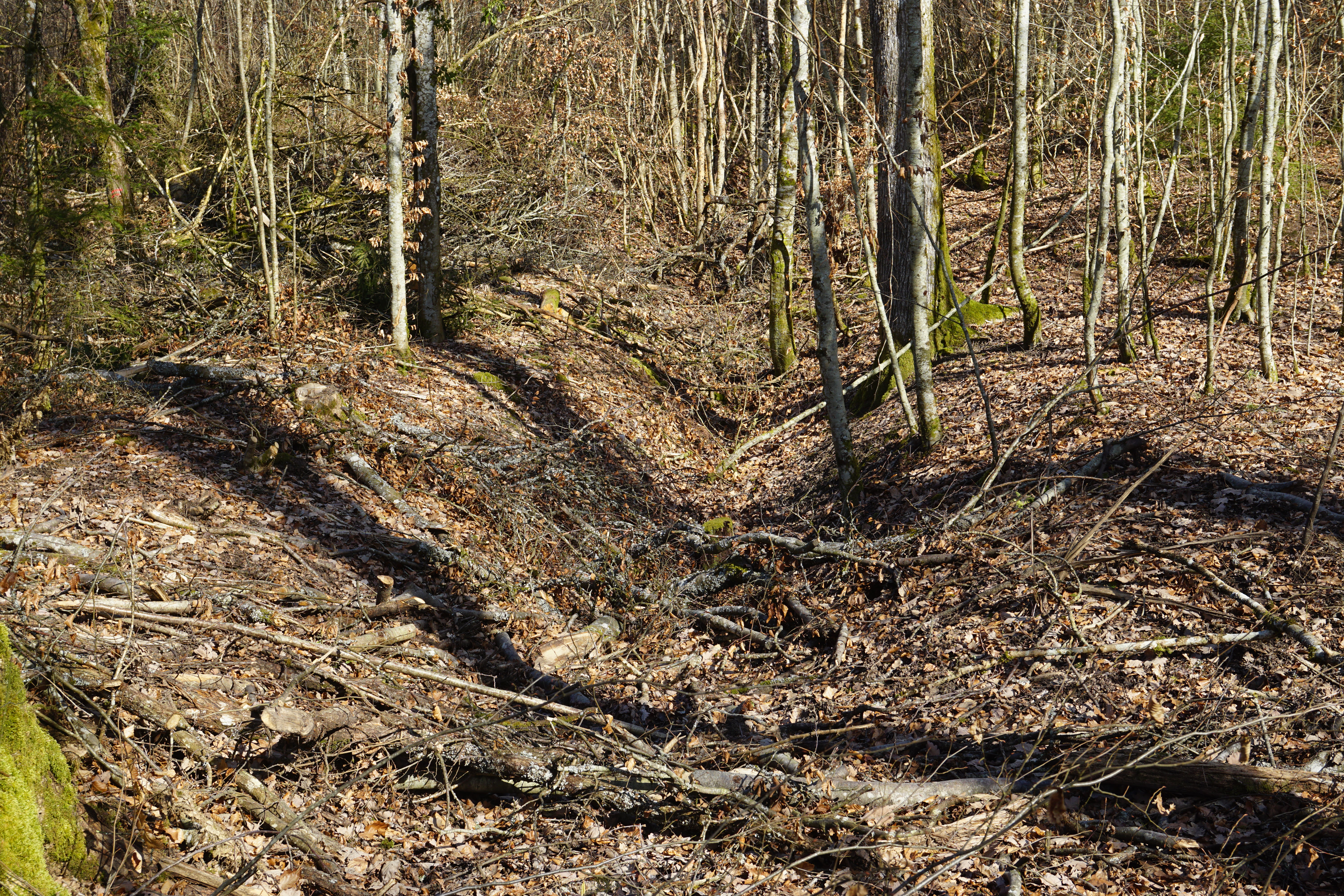
Trench providing access to the main adit.

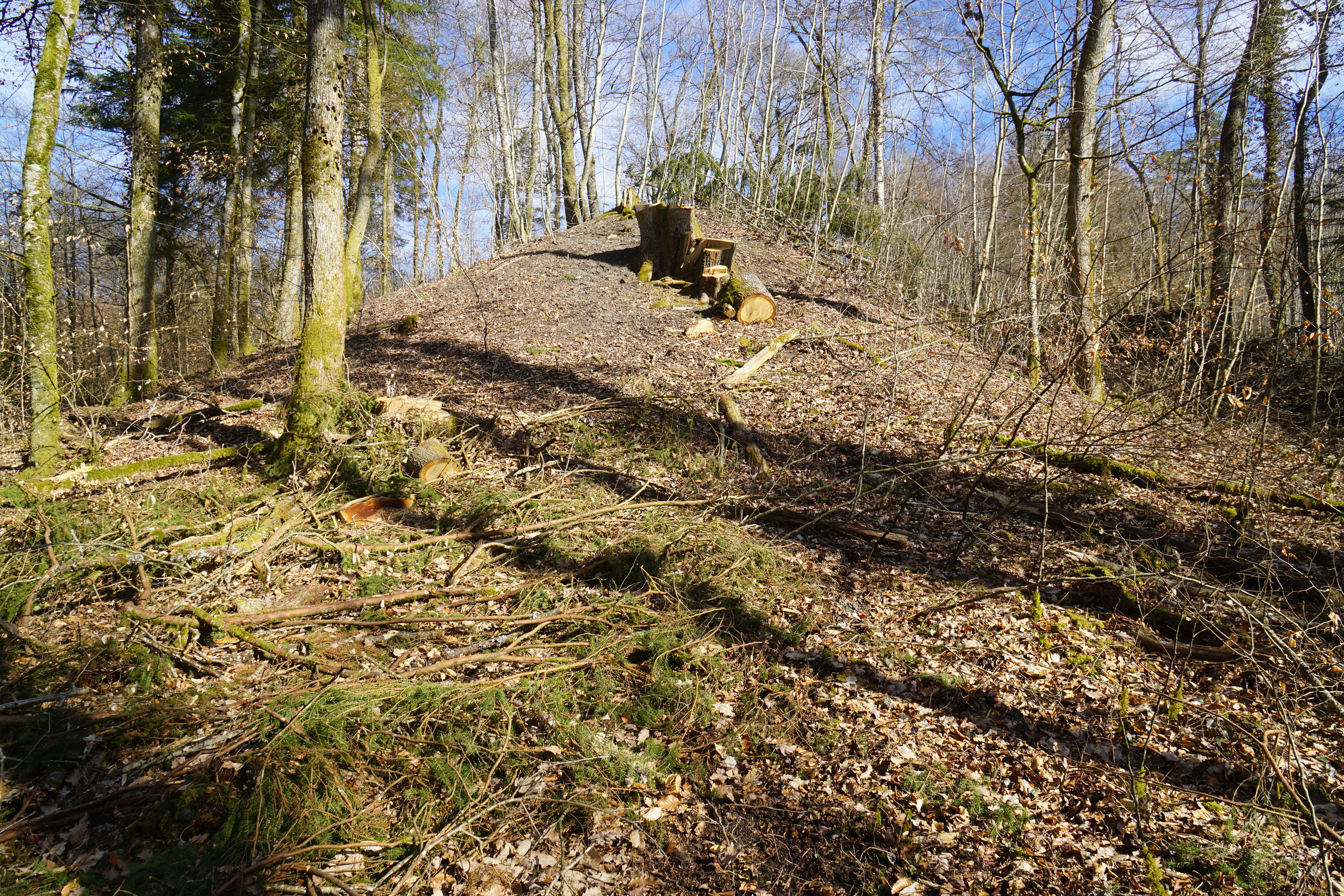
End of the slag heap of the main adit.

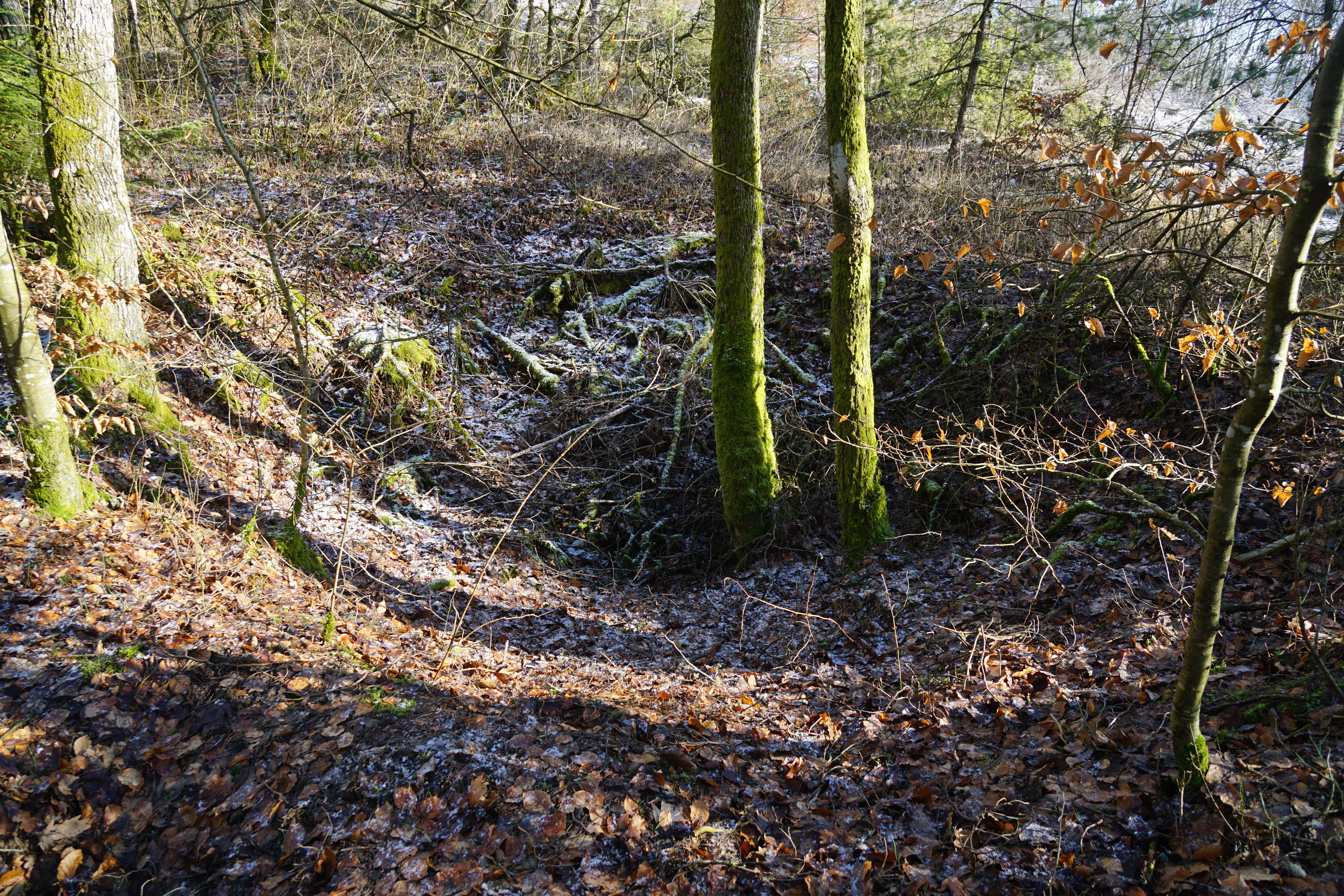
Funnel formed by the shaft located to the north of Crainvillers.

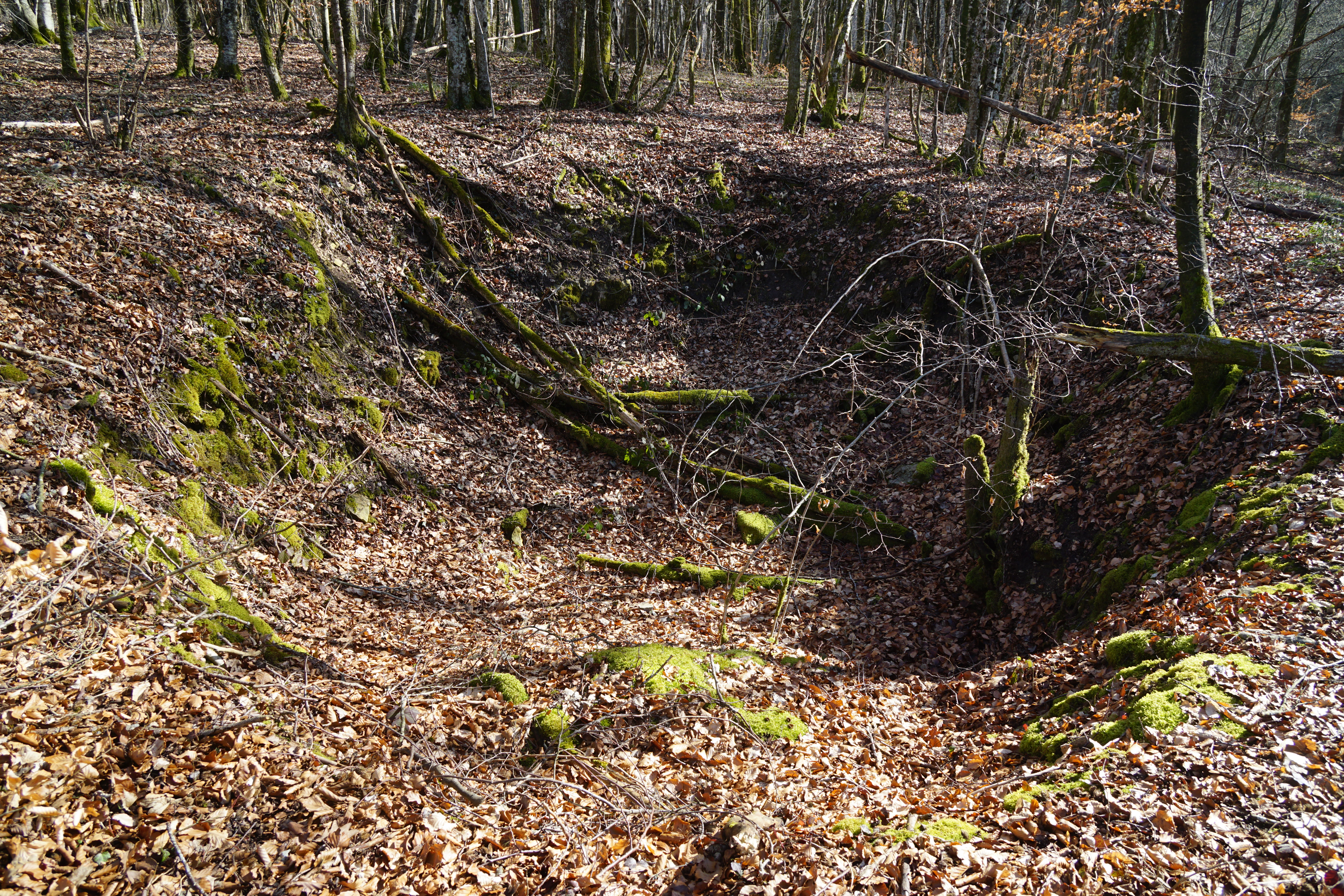
Funnel formed by shaft No. 1.

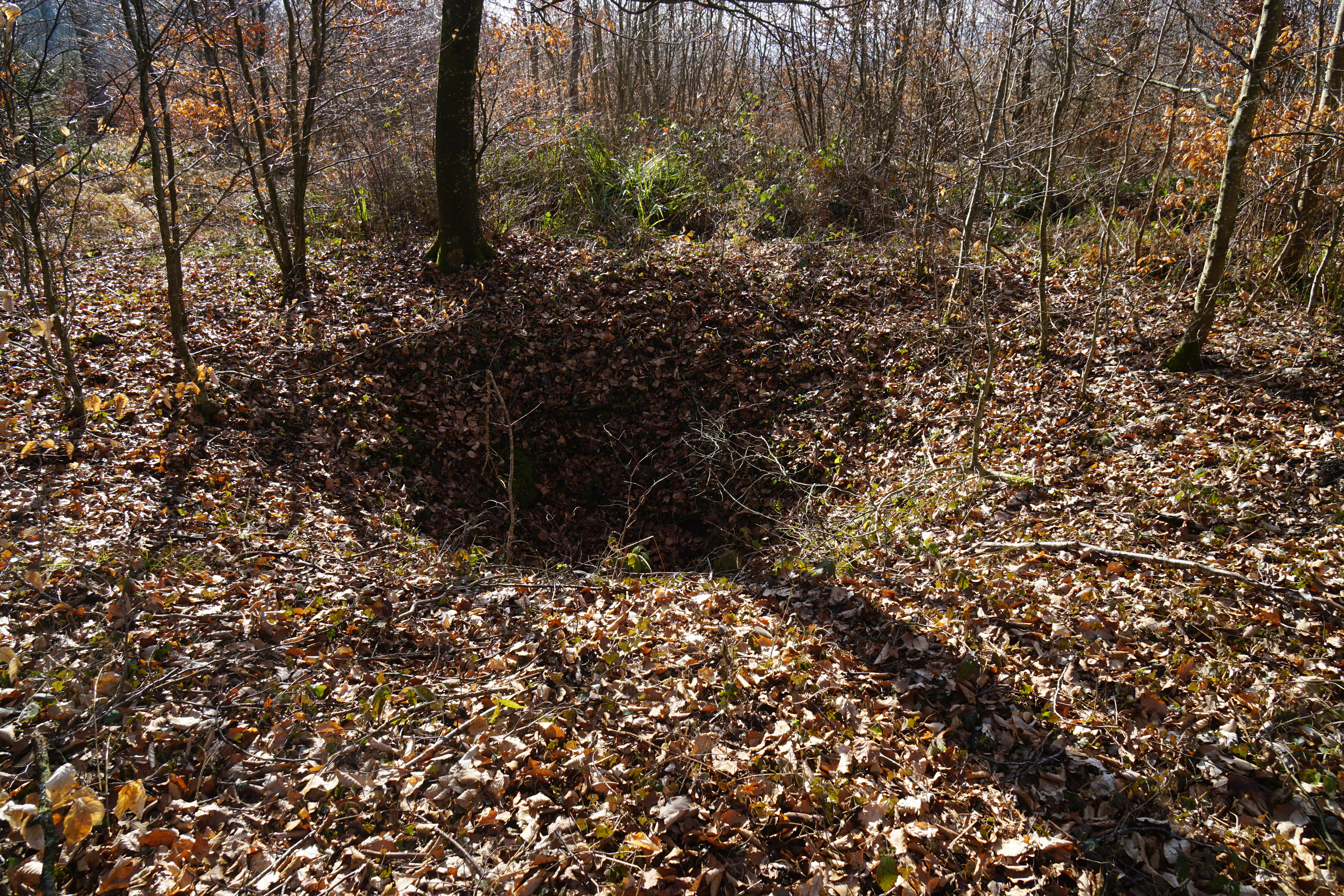
Funnel formed by shaft No. 2.

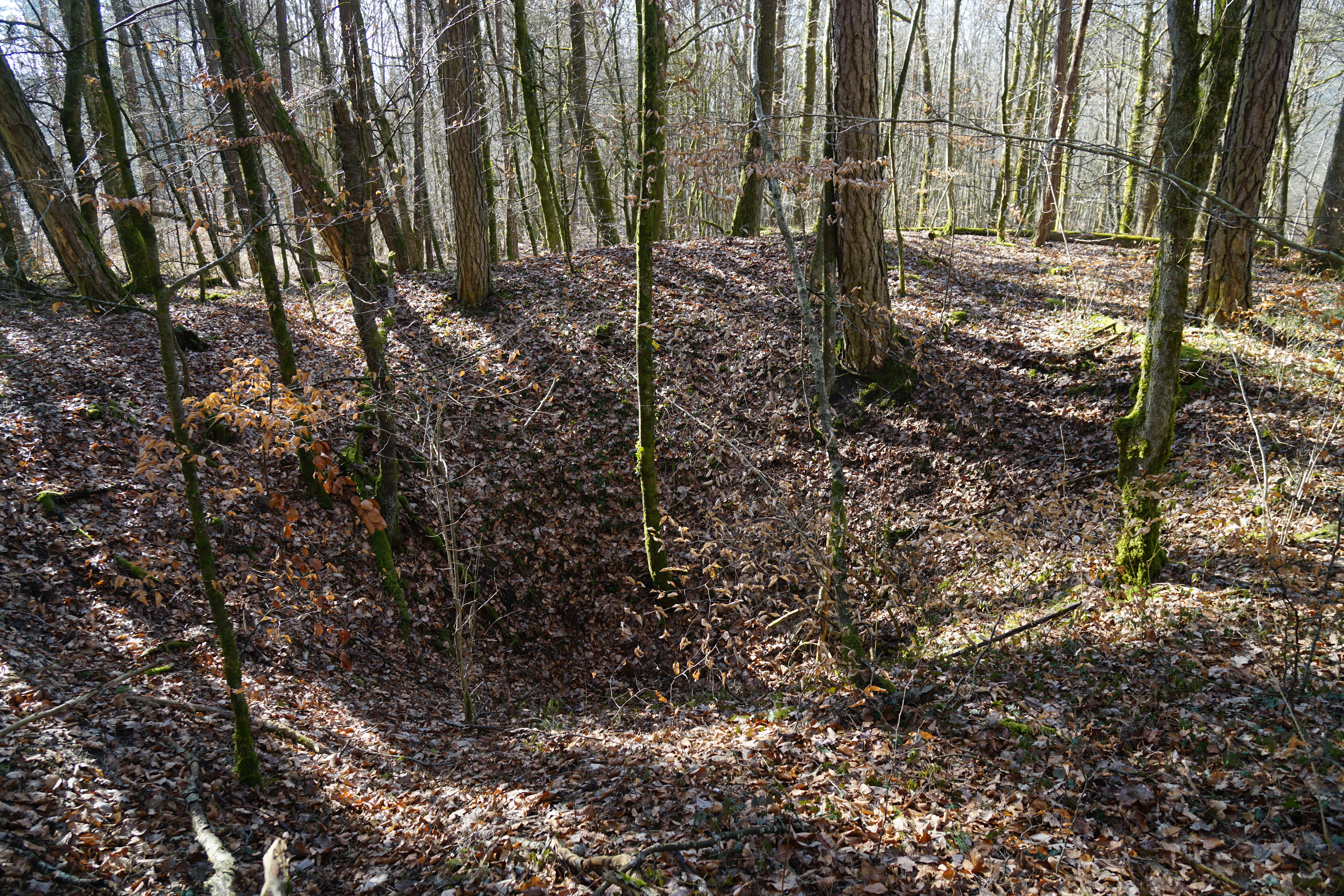
Funnel formed by shaft No. 3.

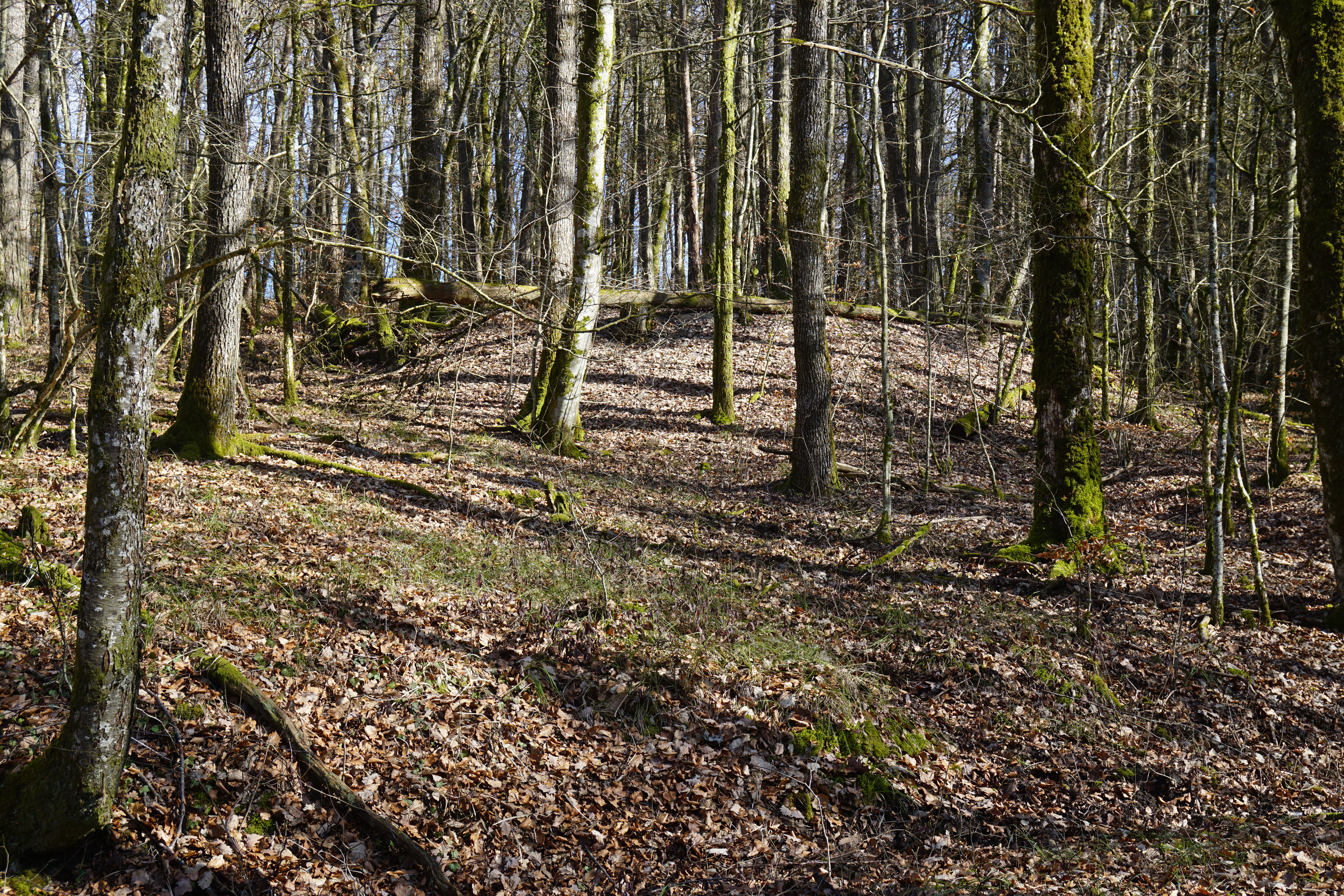
Slag heap from pit No. 3.

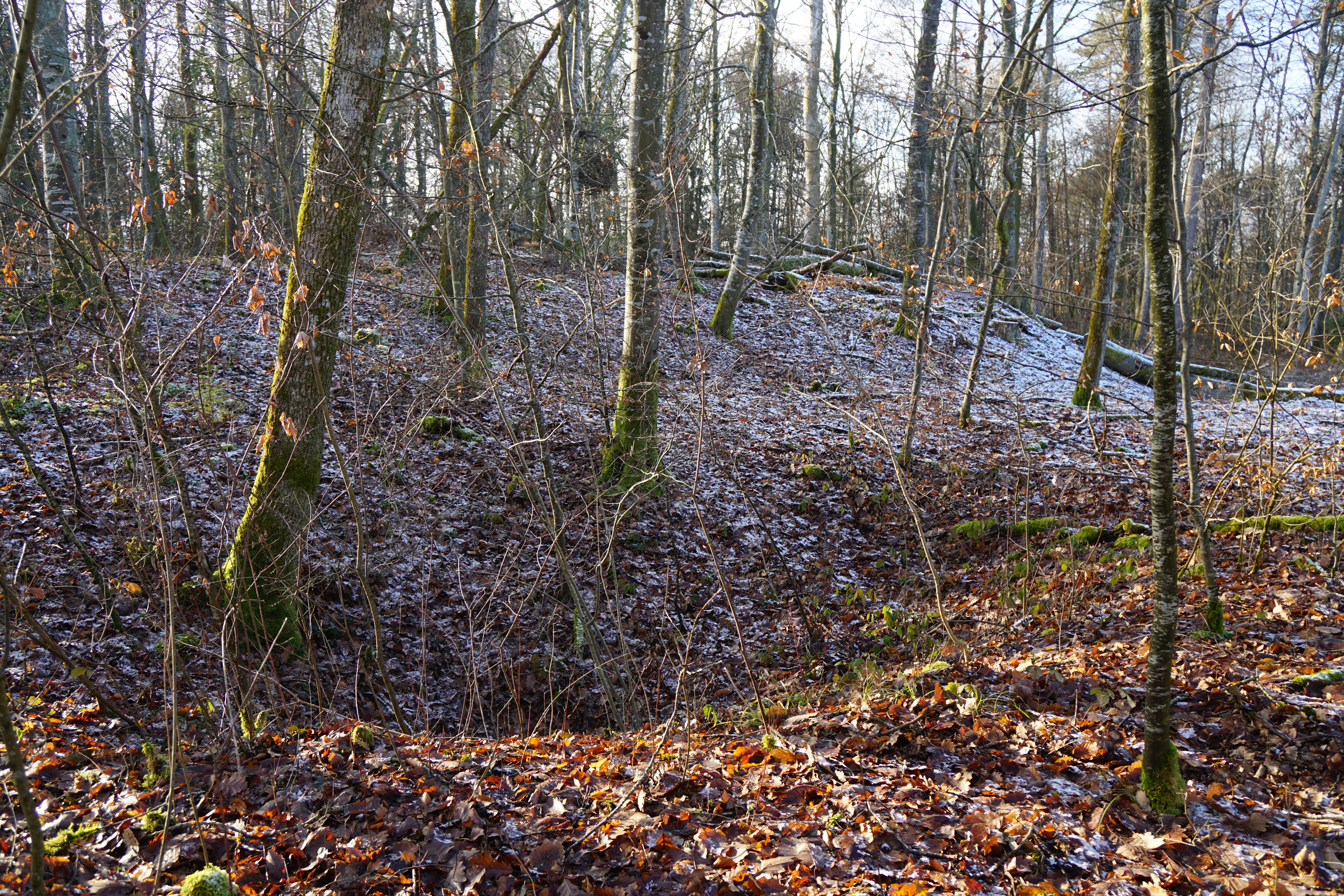
Funnel formed by the pit located southwest of Crainvillers with the slag heap behind.

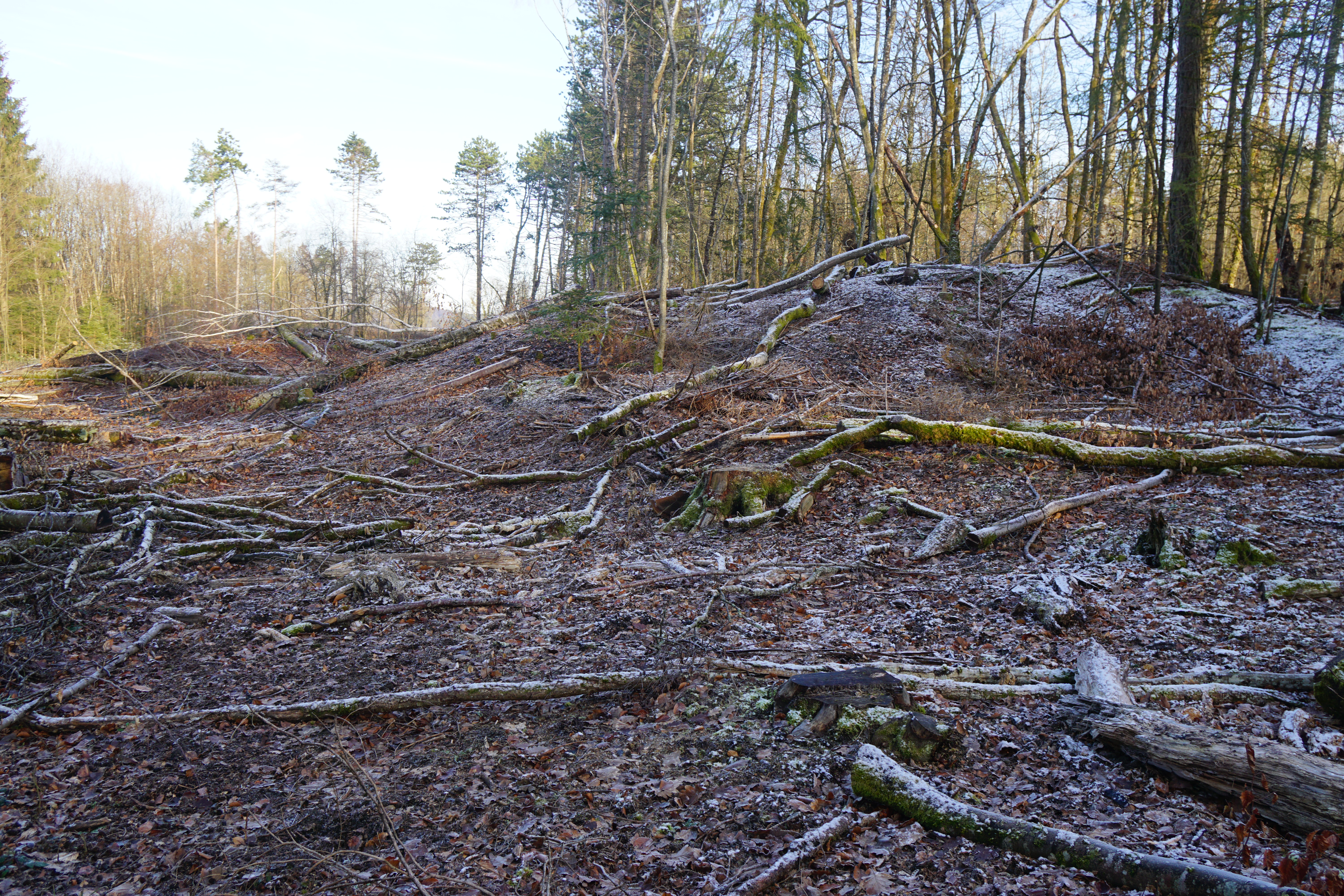
General view of the slag heap from the pit located southwest of Crainvillers.

=== Saint-Menge (Gemmelaincourt) concession ===
The mining sectors exploited: 1. Le Cugnot (1830–1835); 2. Le Chanois (1830–1853); 3. Gemmelaincourt (1853–1912); 4. Le Faubourg de Saint-Menge (1916–1920); 5. Saint-Menge (1940s).

Granted on May 20, 1829, the Saint-Menge concession, covering the municipalities of Saint-Menge and Gemmelaincourt, had the longest, most consistent, and most significant mining activity. Between 1902 and 1912, production reached 120,000 tons.

Mining operations took place successively:

- At Le Cugnot (Saint-Menge) between 1830 and 1835;
- At Le Chanois (Saint-Menge) between 1830 and 1853;
- In Gemmelaincourt, between 1853 and 1912;
- In the Saint-Menge suburb between 1916 and 1920;
- In both municipalities during the 1940s.

==== Le Cugnot ====
Mining at Le Cugnot began around 1830 and ended around 1835. The coal seam was relatively uniform, averaging 40 to 45 cm in thickness but tapering to 10 or 15 cm at the deposit limits.

In 1876, Engineer Hardouin drilled an exploratory shaft, which yielded negative results. Forty years later, in 1917, another engineer, Savoy, drilled a shaft that encountered an 8 to 10 cm thick seam. A 30-meter adit was excavated to extend from the shaft, confirming that the shaft was at the deposit's boundary.

==== Le Chanois ====
Mining at Le Chanois began around 1829–1830 with exploratory shafts No. 1, 2, 3, and 6. Shaft No. 6 was the most significant, containing a 66 cm thick seam. A drainage adit was excavated in 1835 between Shaft No. 3, known as "Choiseul," and the Vraine River. The Bassey Shaft was used for extraction in the southeastern sector until 1846. After this date, the area around the drainage adit was mined for a few more years. In 1936, an attempt to restart mining was made by digging a new inclined adit after a 60 cm thick seam was discovered, but the mining authorities ordered work to stop.

The slag heap of the North Chanois pit.
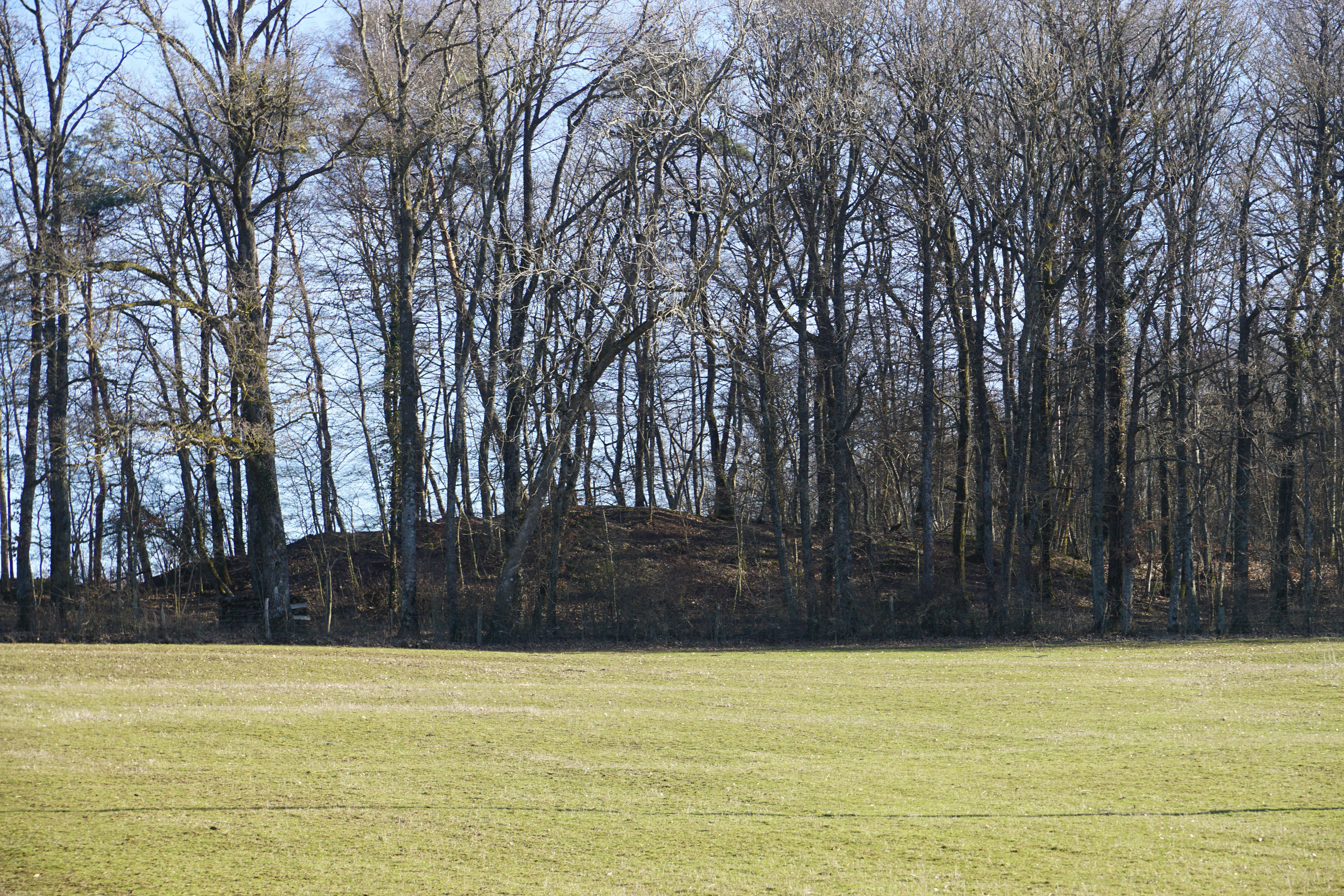
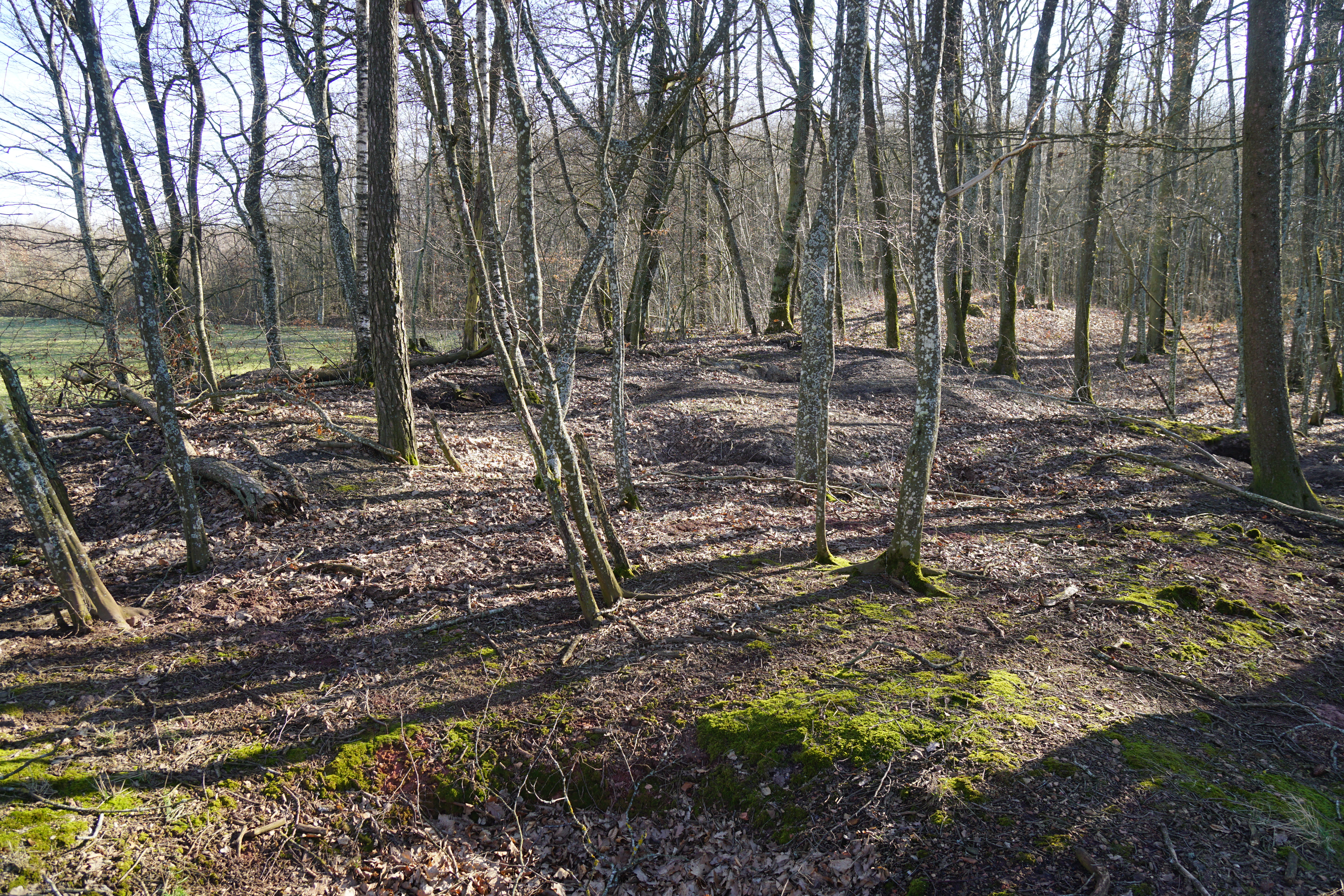
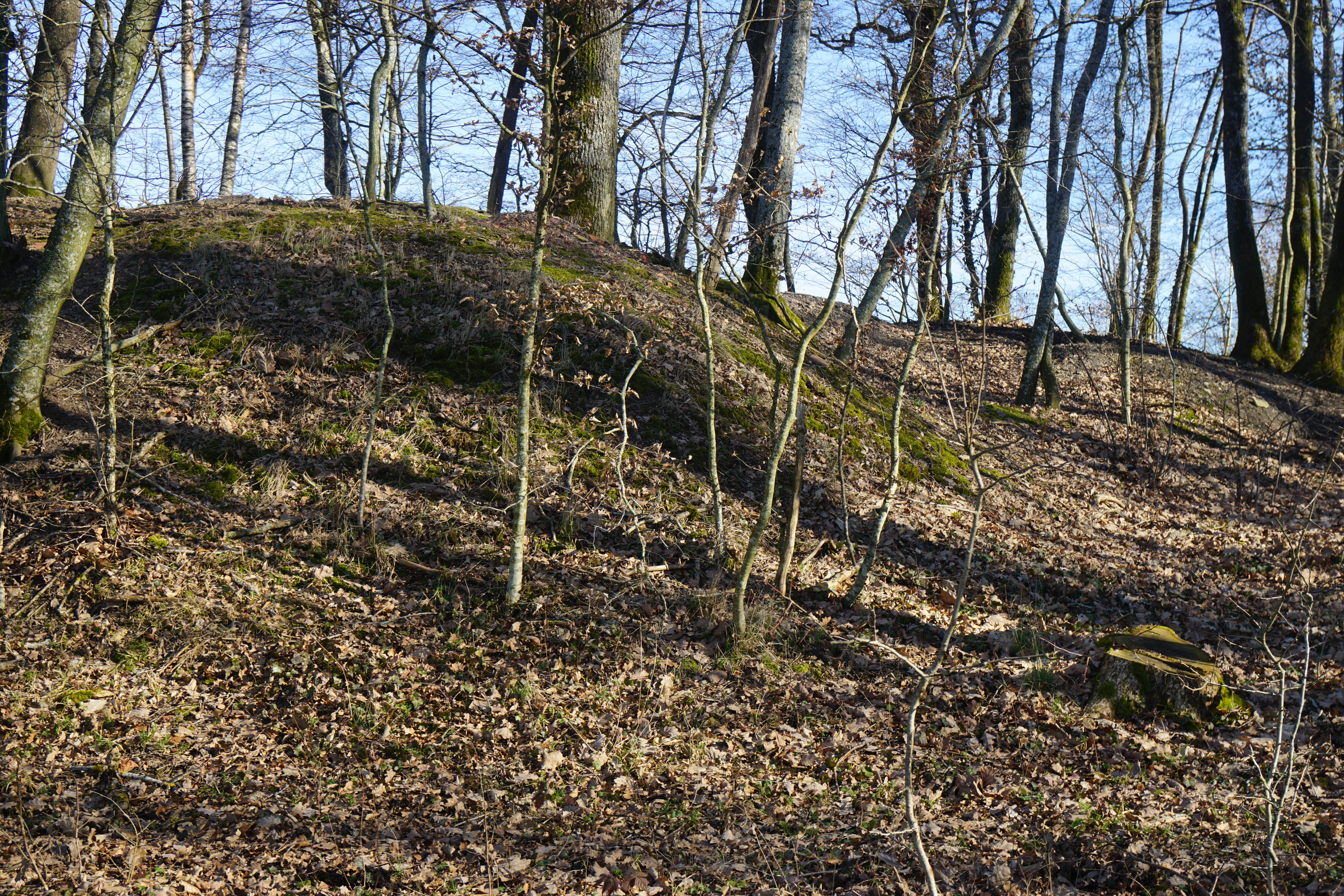

==== Gemmelaincourt ====
Mining operations in Gemmelaincourt began in 1853 and continued uninterrupted until April–May 1912. The mine was then taken over by the Société Gemmelaincourt-Gironcourt. Access to the mine was provided through galleries and ventilation shafts. This sector contained coal seams ranging from 80 cm to one meter in thickness. By the time mining ceased in 1912, the remaining exploitable seams measured 40 cm.

It was the only site in the mining basin where a coal-washing plant and a miners' housing estate were built.

The mining town of Gemmelaincourt.

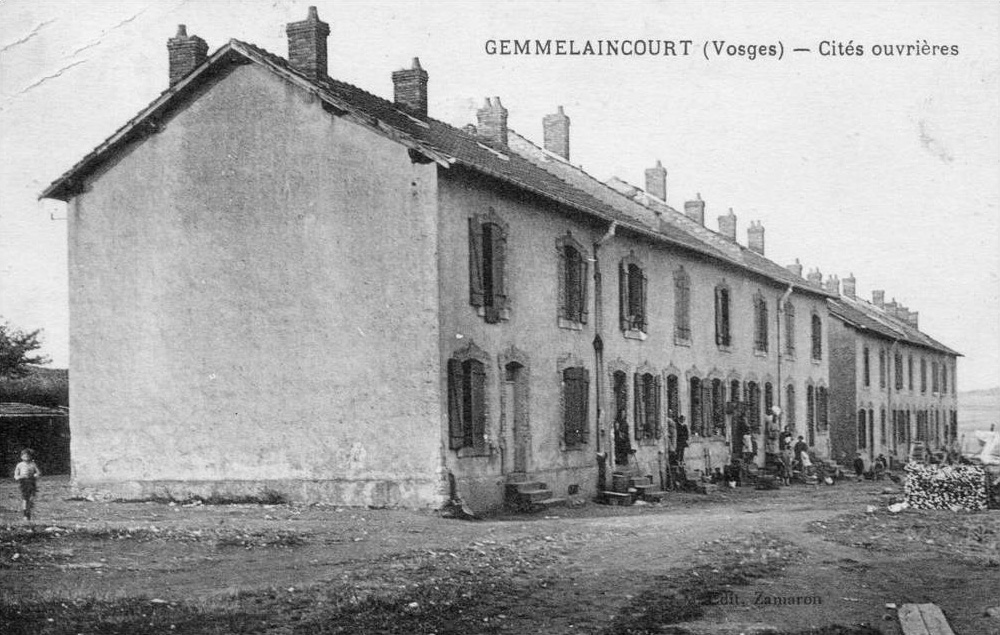
In the mining era, around 1910.

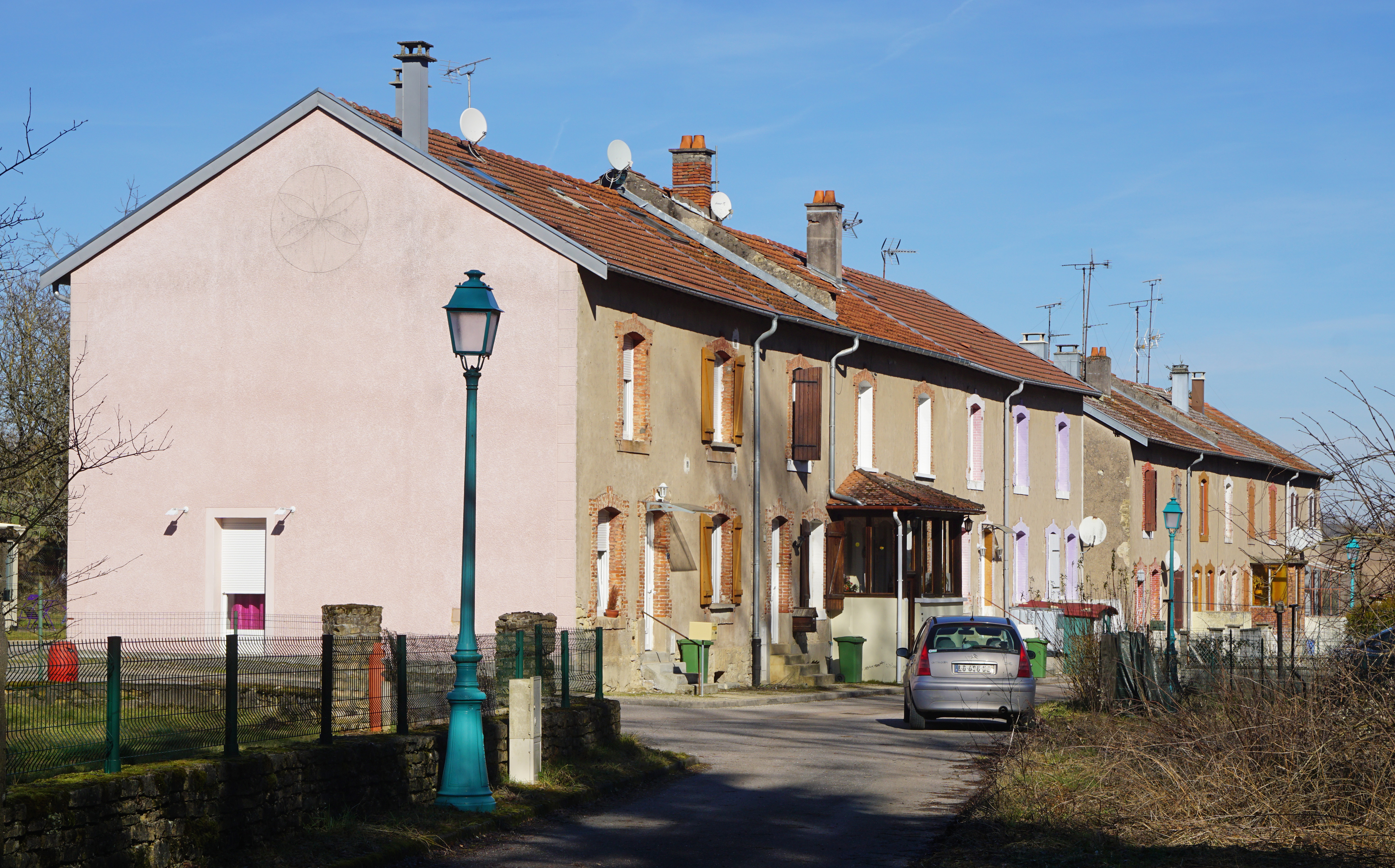
In 2019.

The coal-fired wash house in Gemmelaincourt in the 1900s.
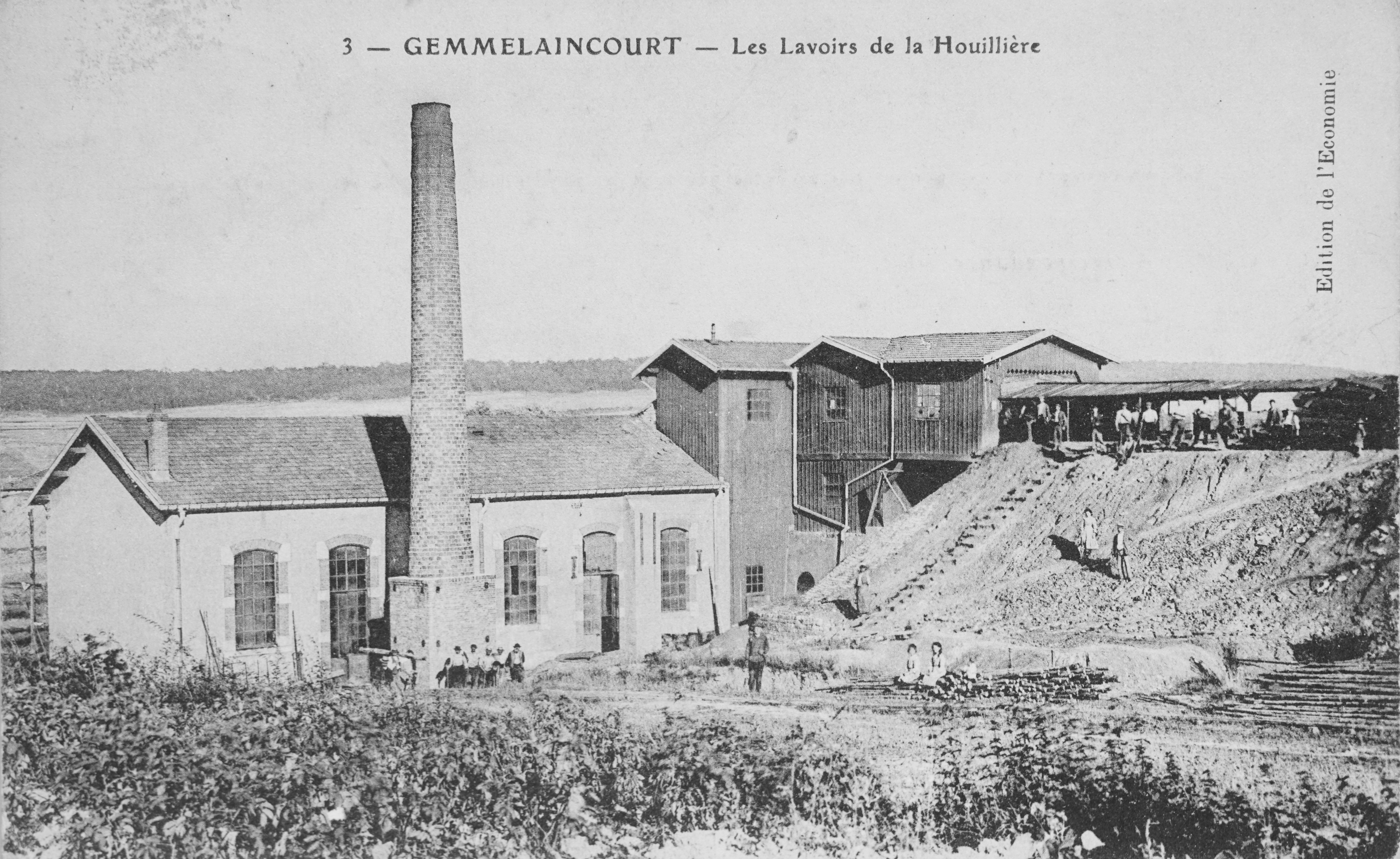
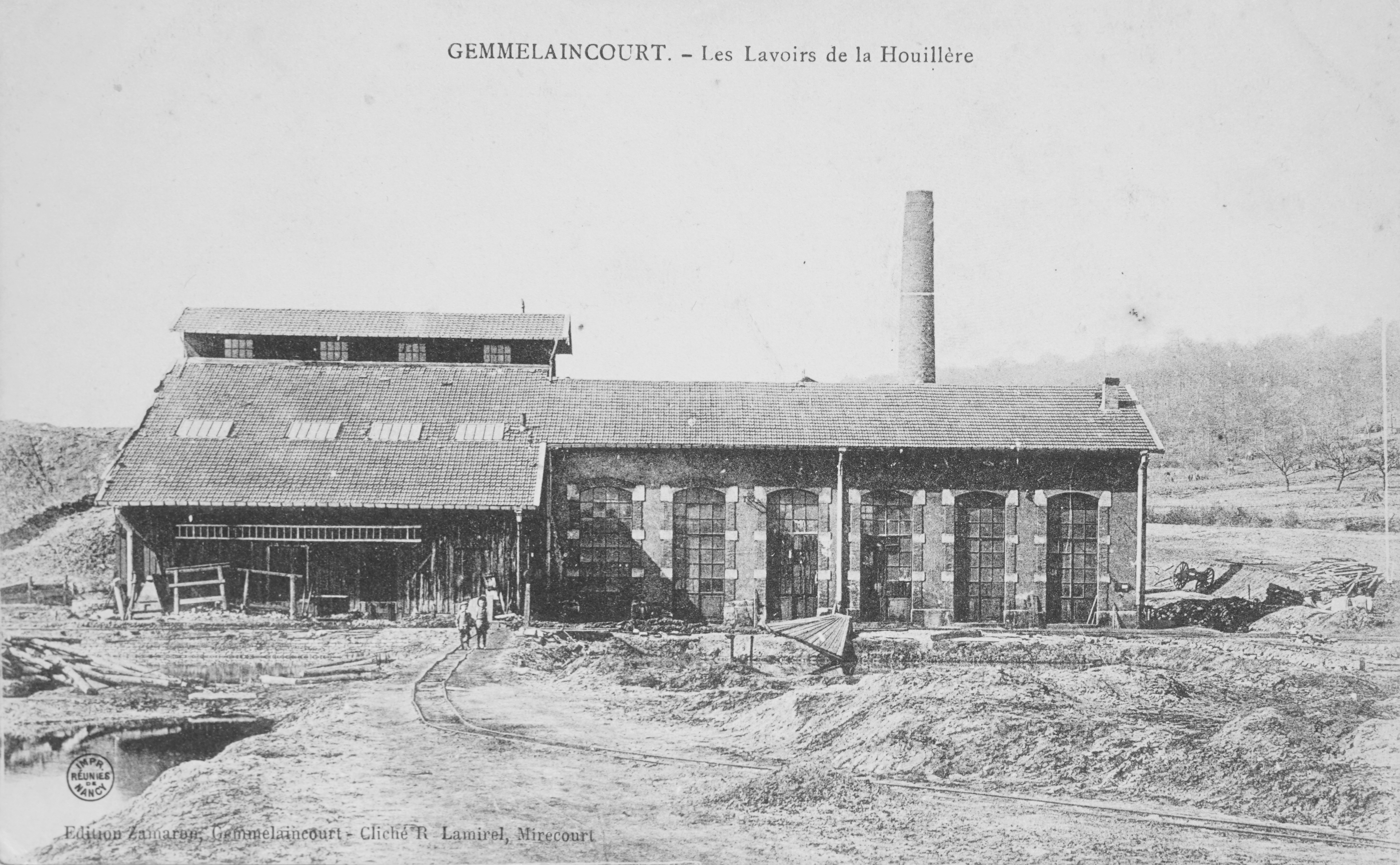
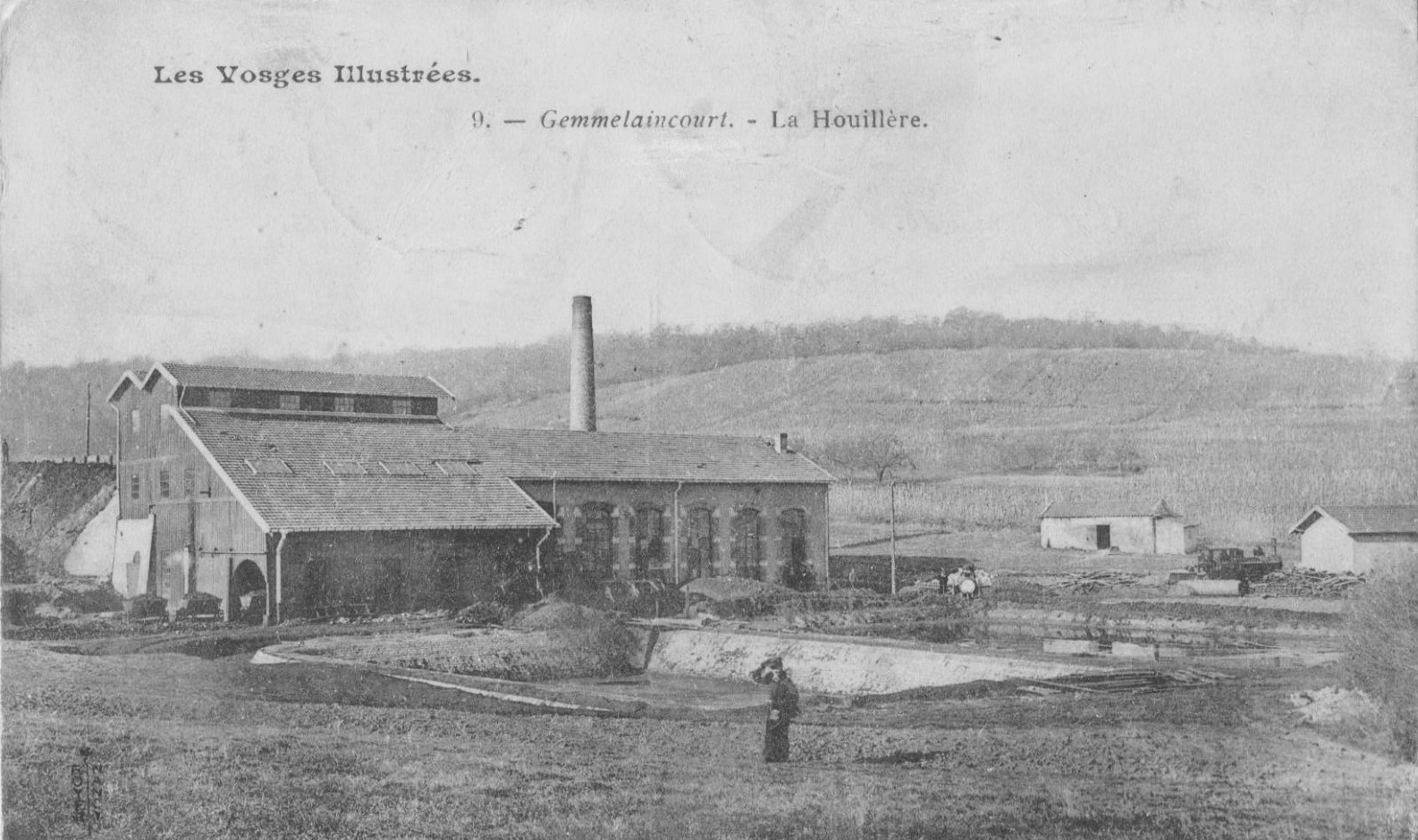
Remains of the coal-fired wash house.

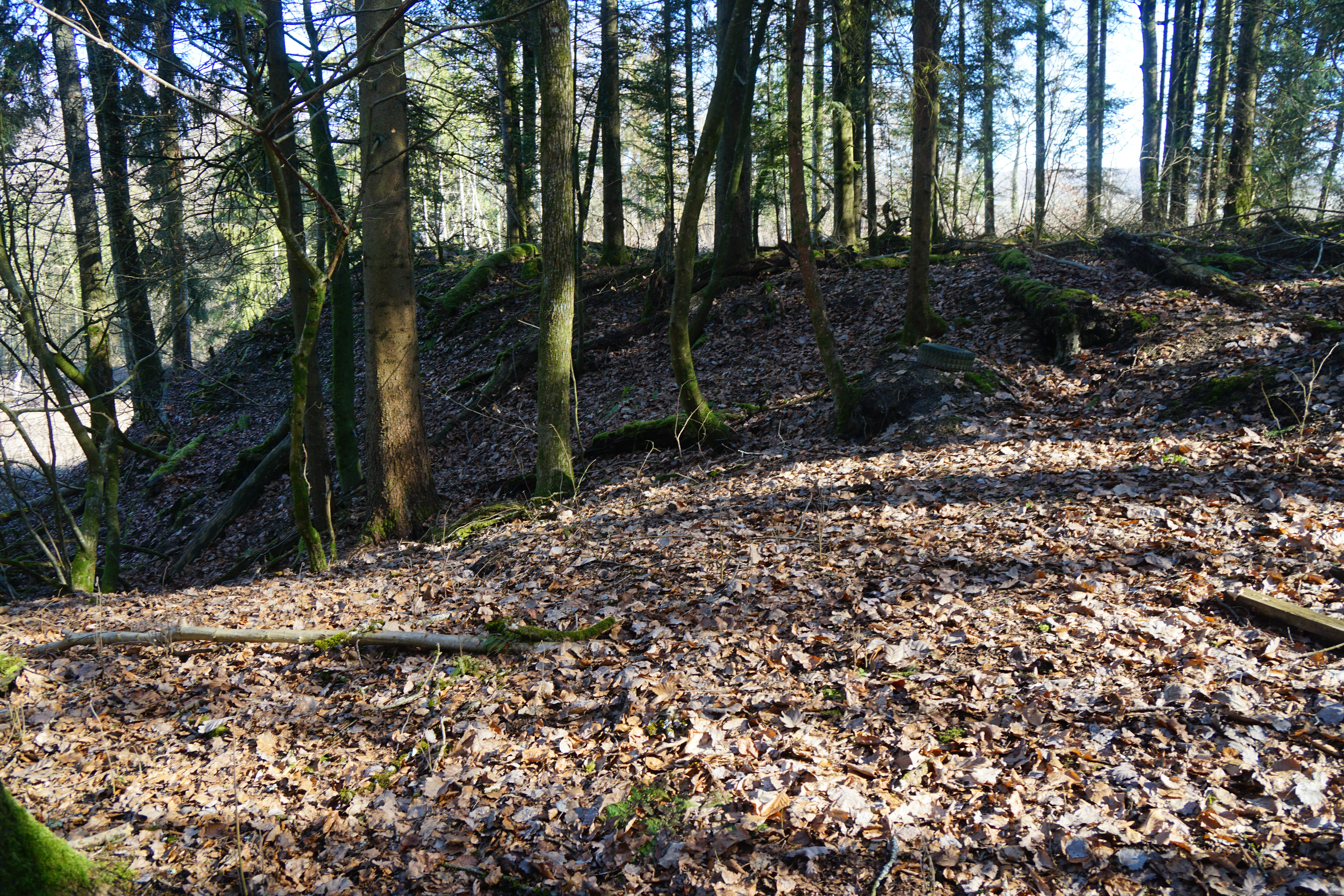
Junction between the slag heap and the wash house as above.

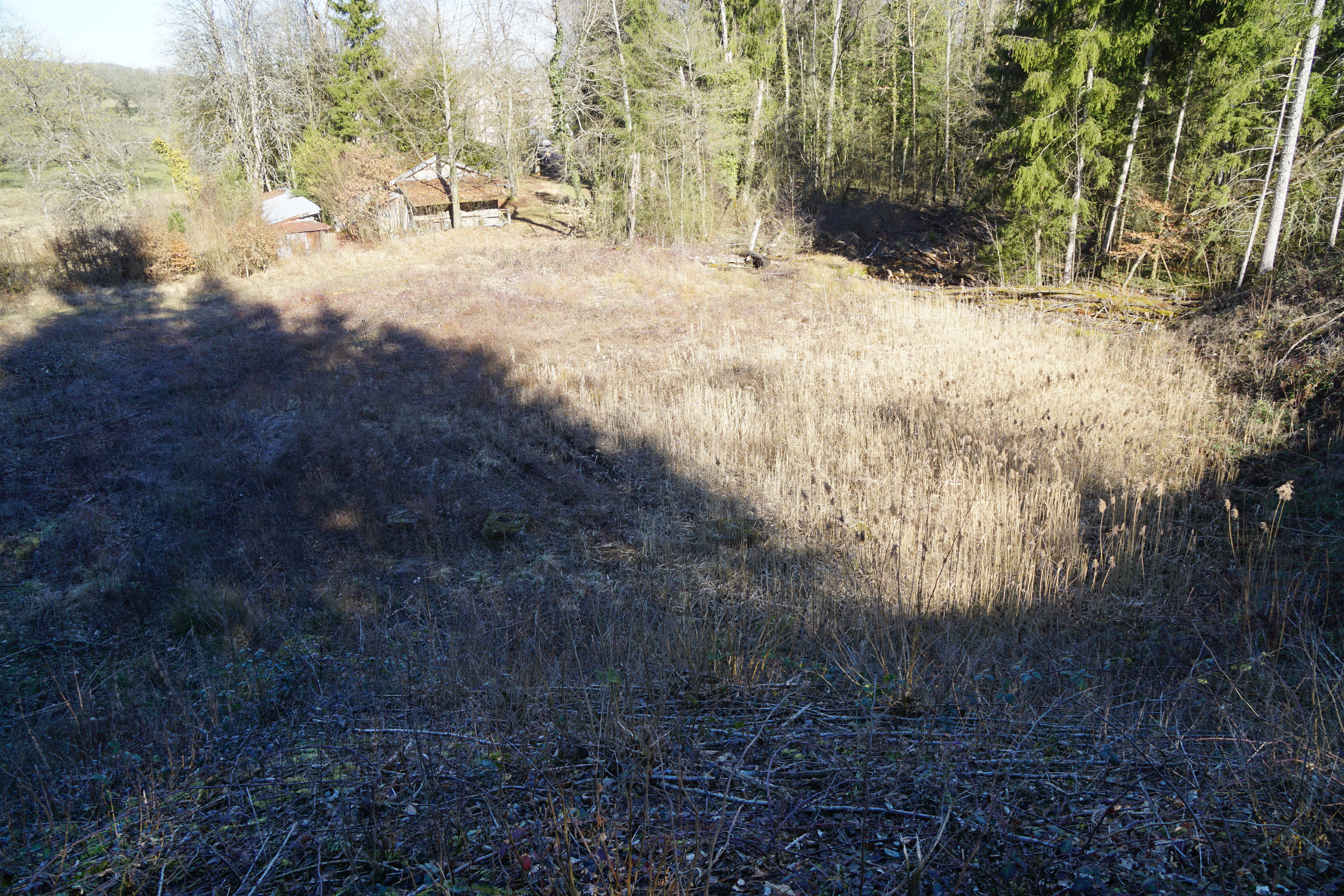
Location of the wash house.

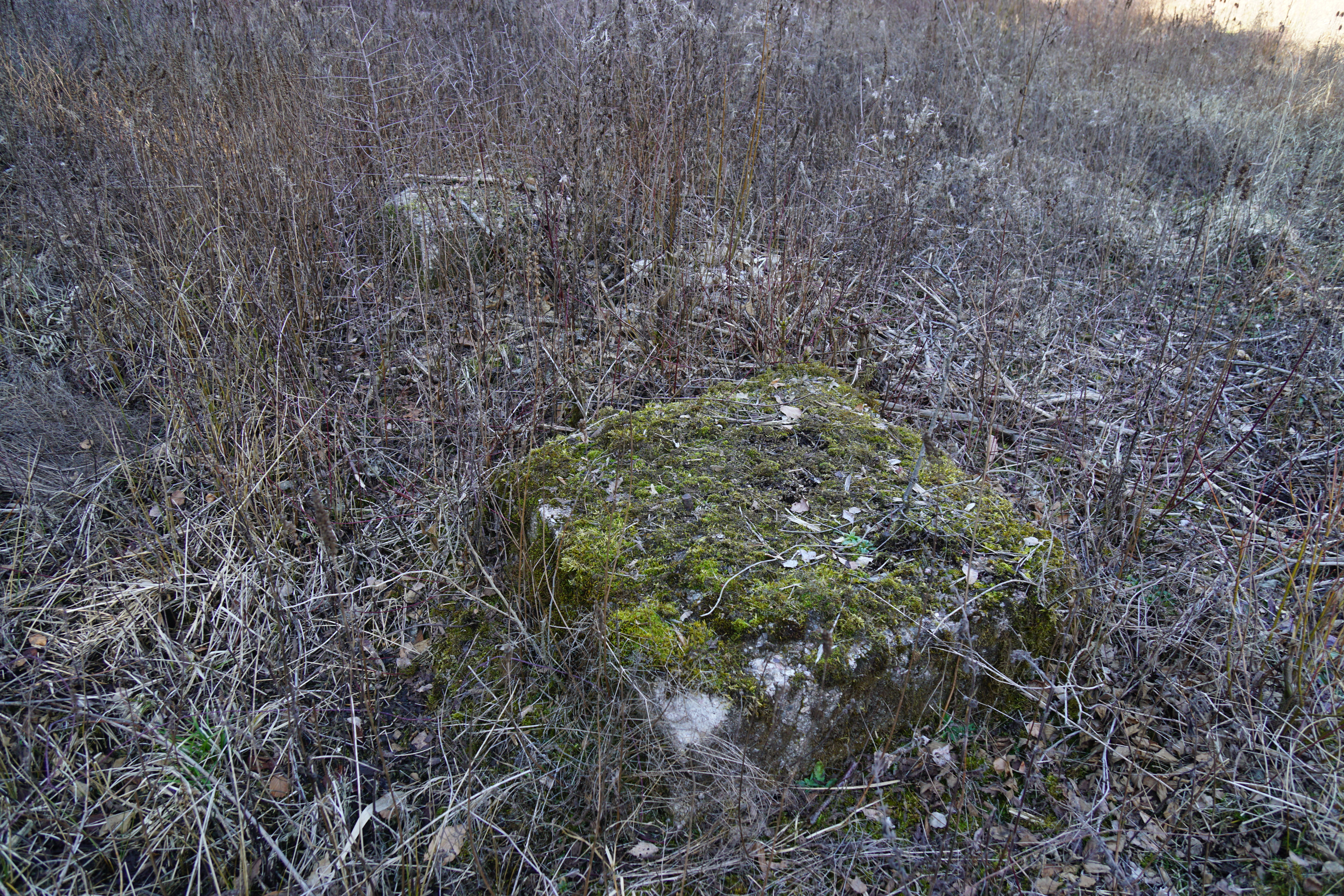
Remains of the wash house.

Other mining remains of Gemmelaincourt.

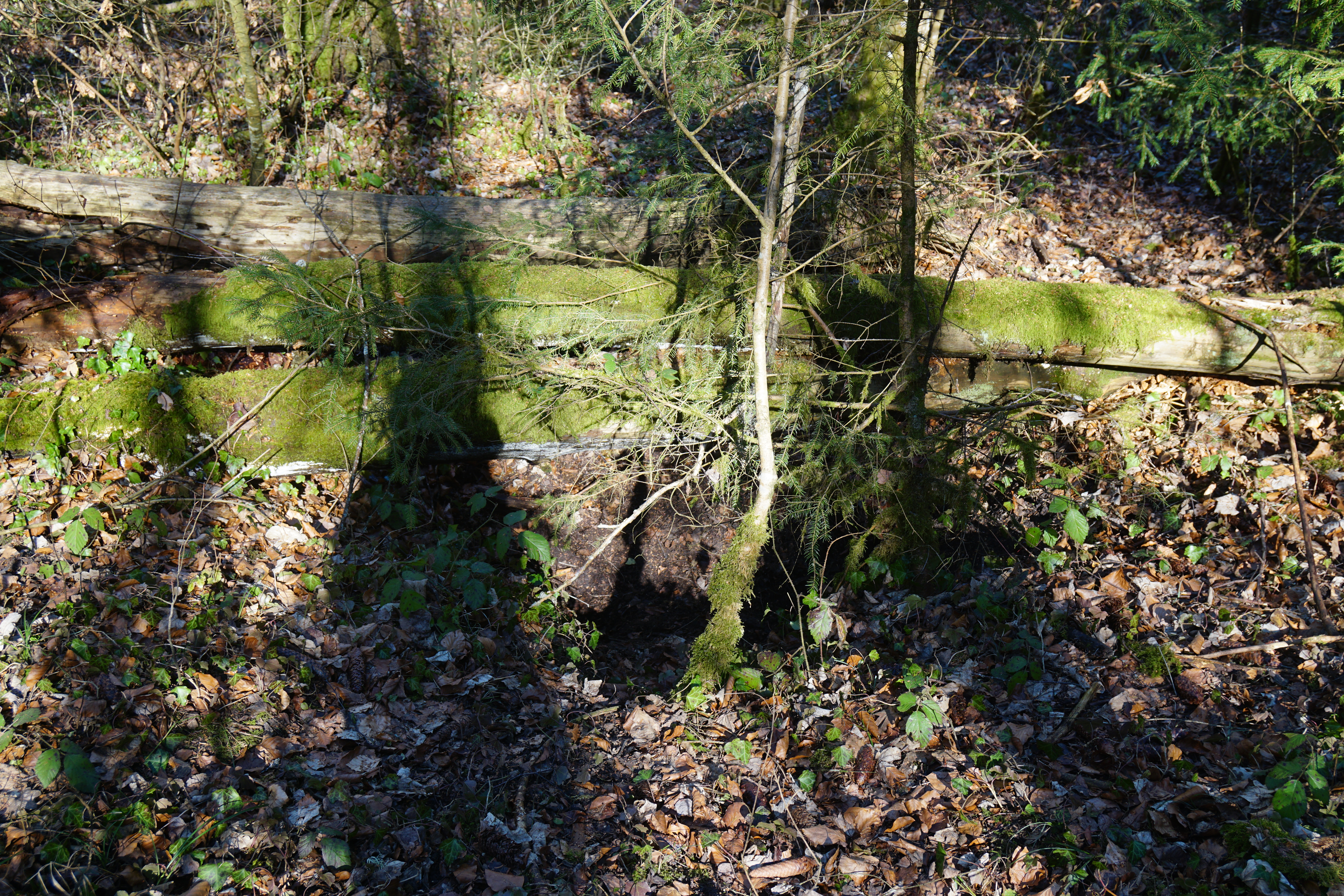
The funnel formed by the Deuille pit, masked by tree trunks.

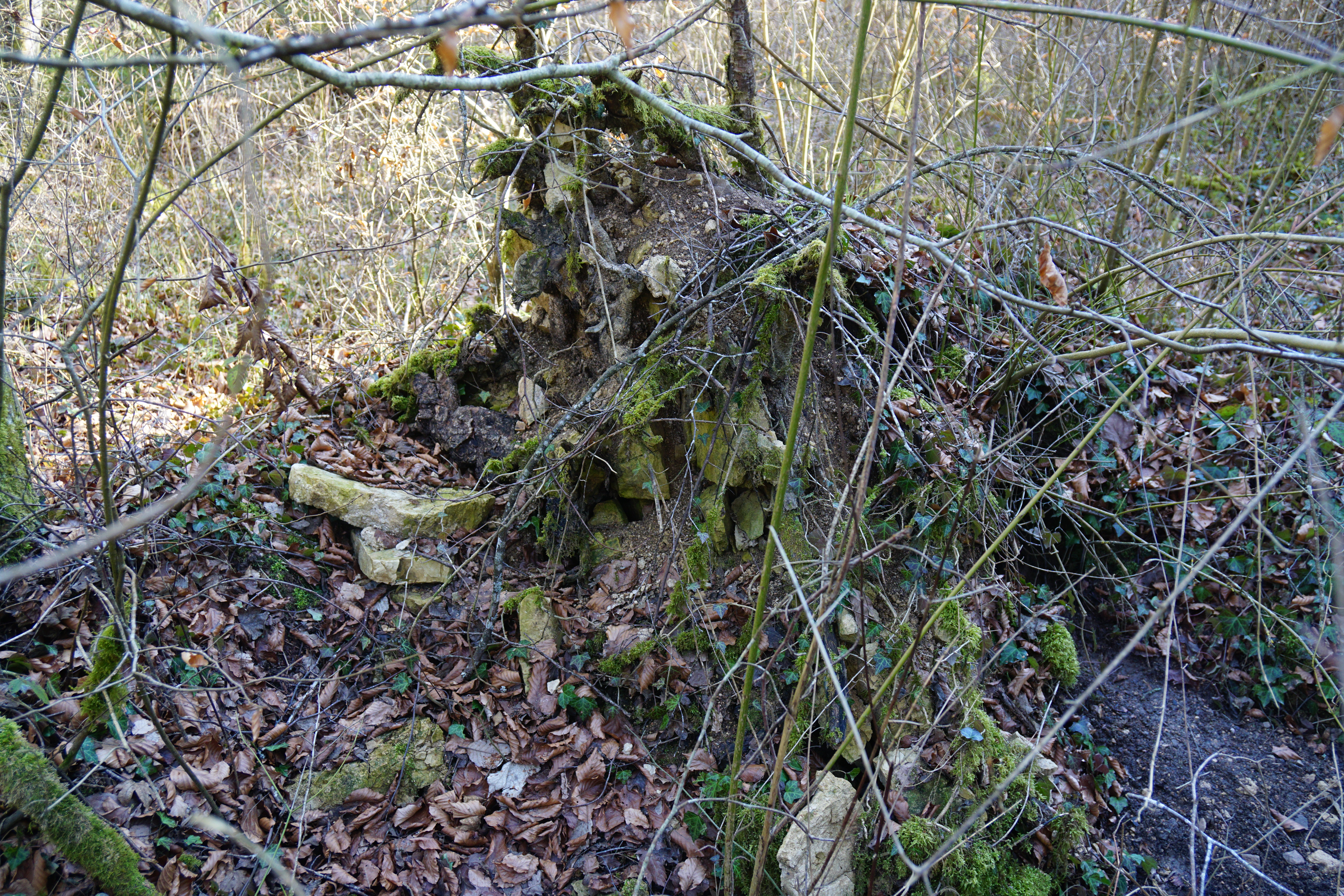
Building stones at the Deuille pit.

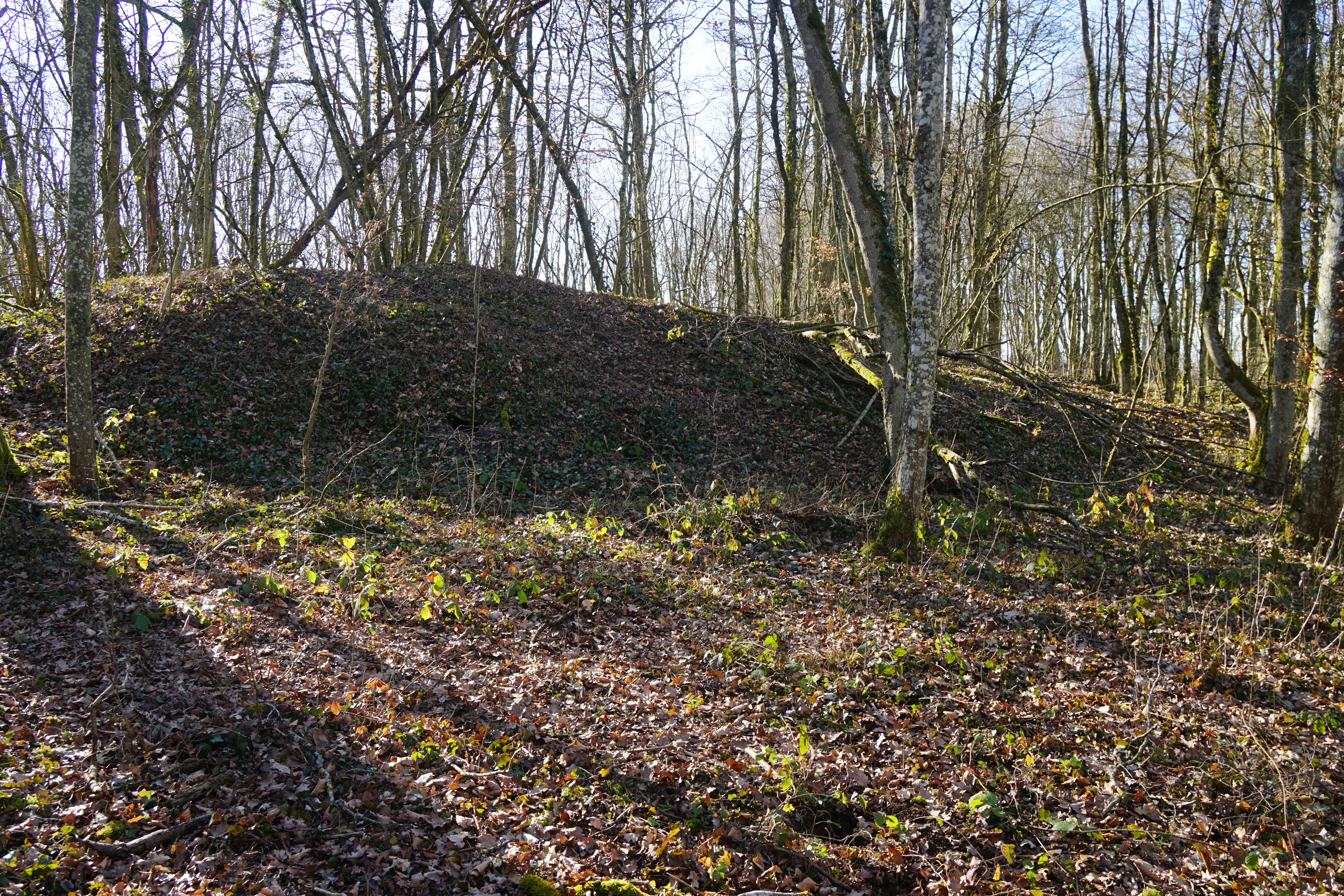
The slag heap of the Haplat pit.

==== Faubourg de Saint-Menge ====
Between 1916 and 1920, a final deposit of "adequate" coal was mined by the Société Gemmelaincourt-Gironcourt under the direction of Mr. Savoy.

Mining remains in the area

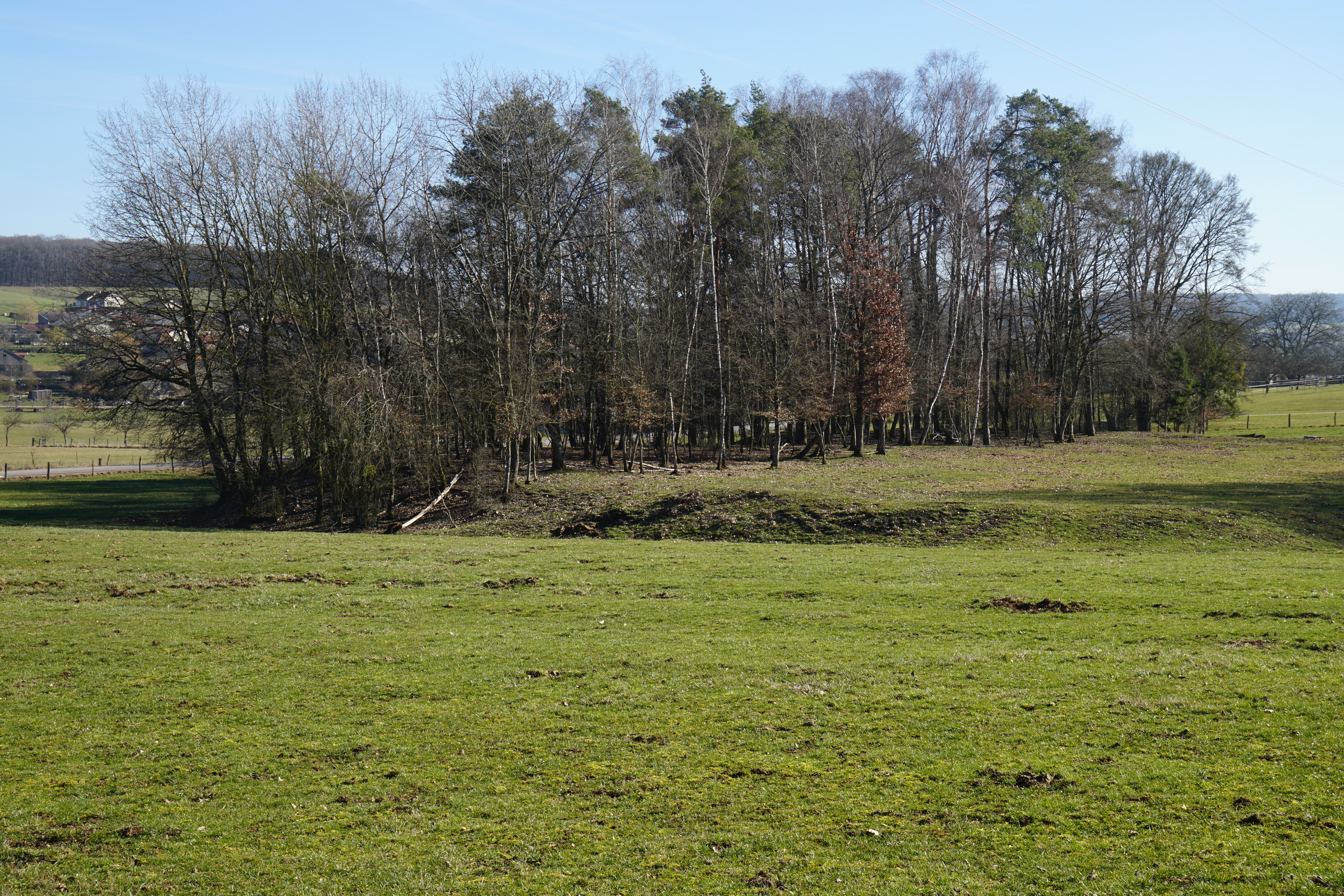
Mining slag heap.

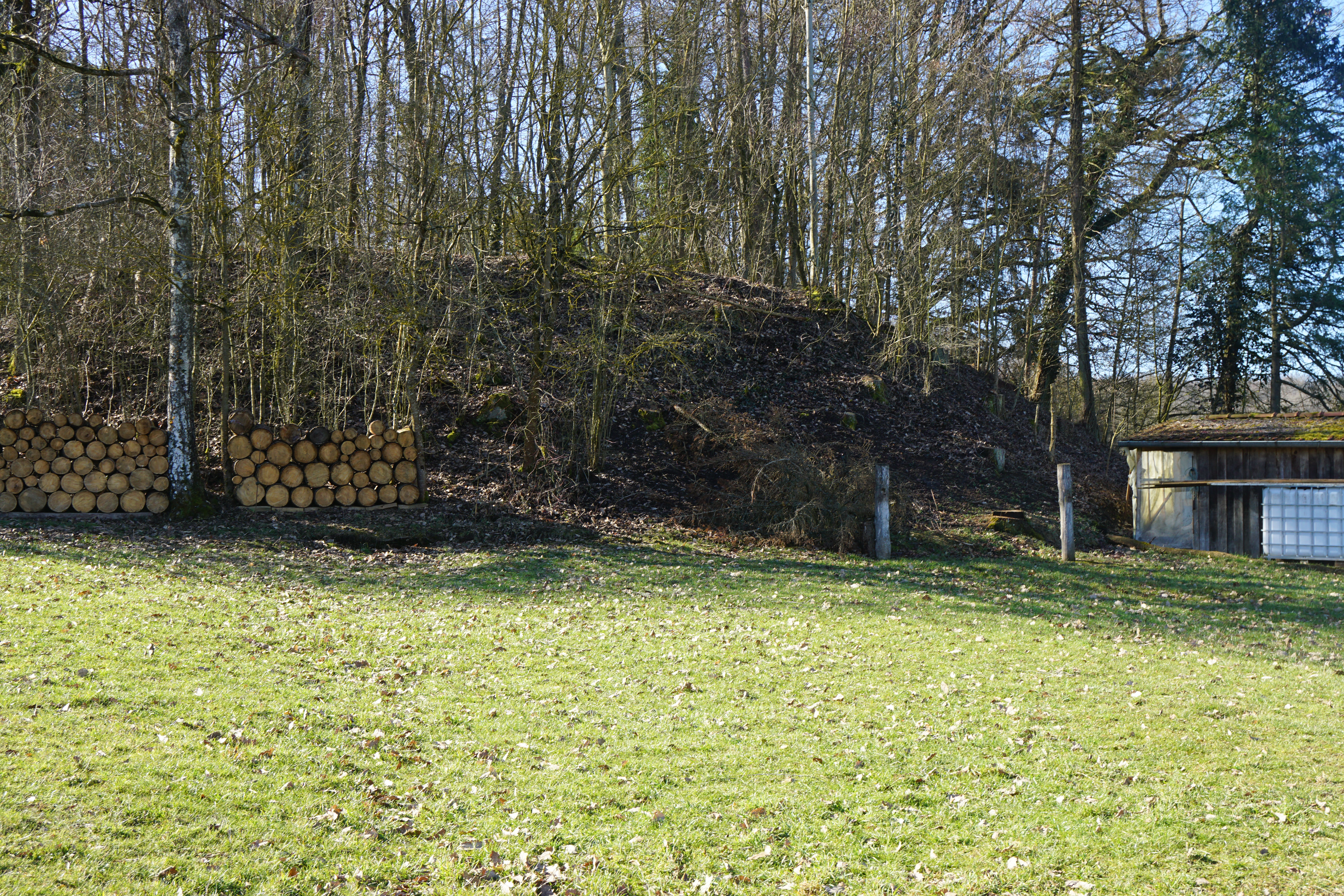
The slag heap of the ventilation shaft.

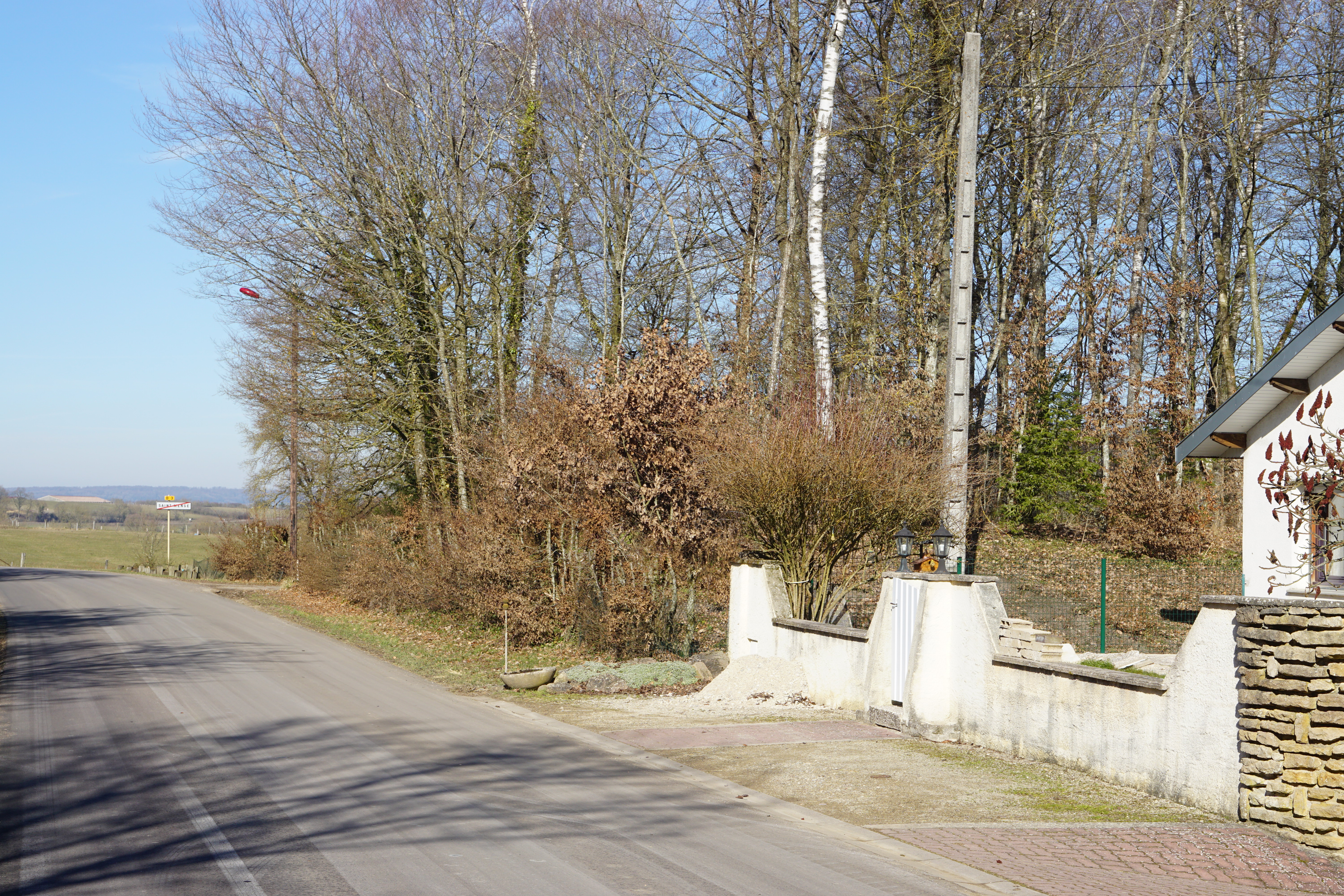
The slag heap of the pumping shaft.

==== The 1940s ====
In 1941, the glassworks of Gironcourt-sur-Vraine faced a coal shortage for its gas generator and resorted to reusing coal from some waste heaps. The Gemmelaincourt mine was reopened in August 1942. In 1943, monthly production ranged between 500 and 550 tons, employing around fifty miners. By February 1946, the Gemmelaincourt mine was producing 1,800 tons per month, employing 135 workers, including 33 German prisoners of war. The equipment was rudimentary, and coal was extracted using pickaxes. The fuel was transported by truck to the Gironcourt glassworks, with a production cost of 700 francs per ton. The surplus was sold at 850 francs per ton and shipped by rail from the local station. However, mining prospects were only expected to last for six more months.

The glassworks of Gironcourt-sur-Vraine
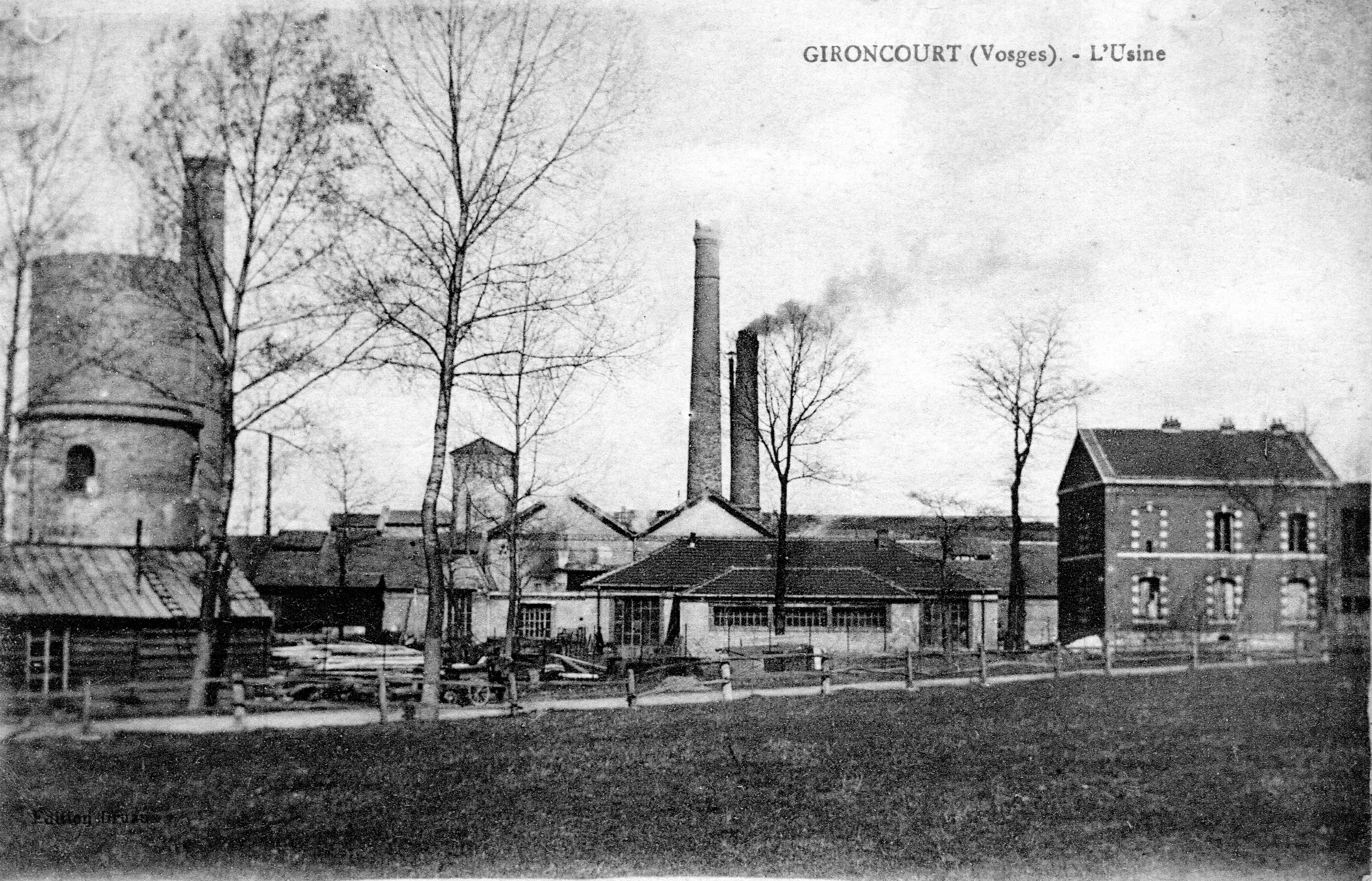
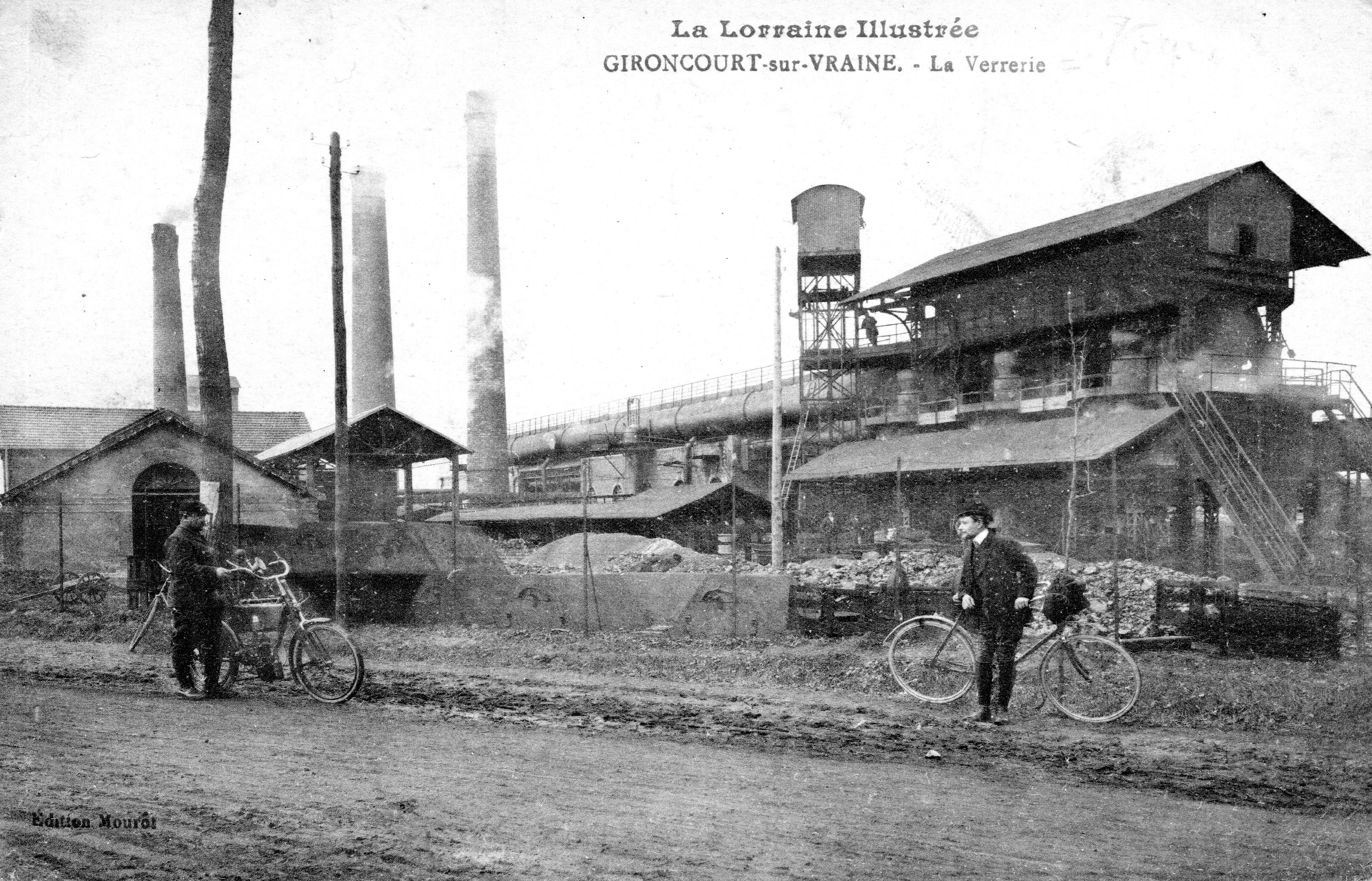

The Saint-Menge mine was reopened in May 1941 with a 100-meter-long inclined shaft to extract particularly hard, pyrite-rich coal from the Chanois area. The shaft was equipped with a winch, a loading hopper, and two drainage pumps (one as a backup) with a capacity of 12 m^{3}/h. By February 1946, the Saint-Menge mine was producing only 2 tons per day, as it was still in the exploration phase.

Saint-Menge gallery slag heap from the 1940s
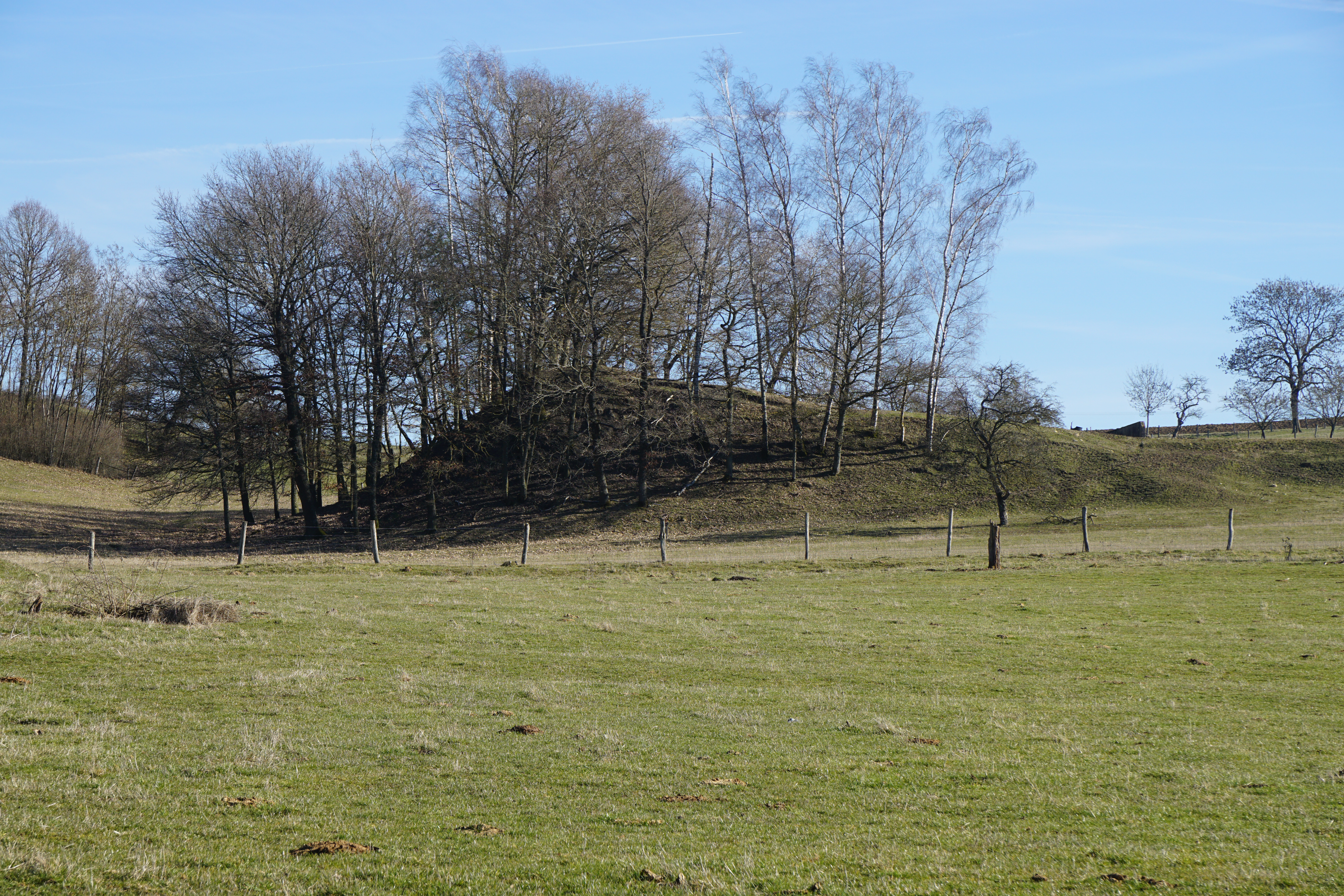
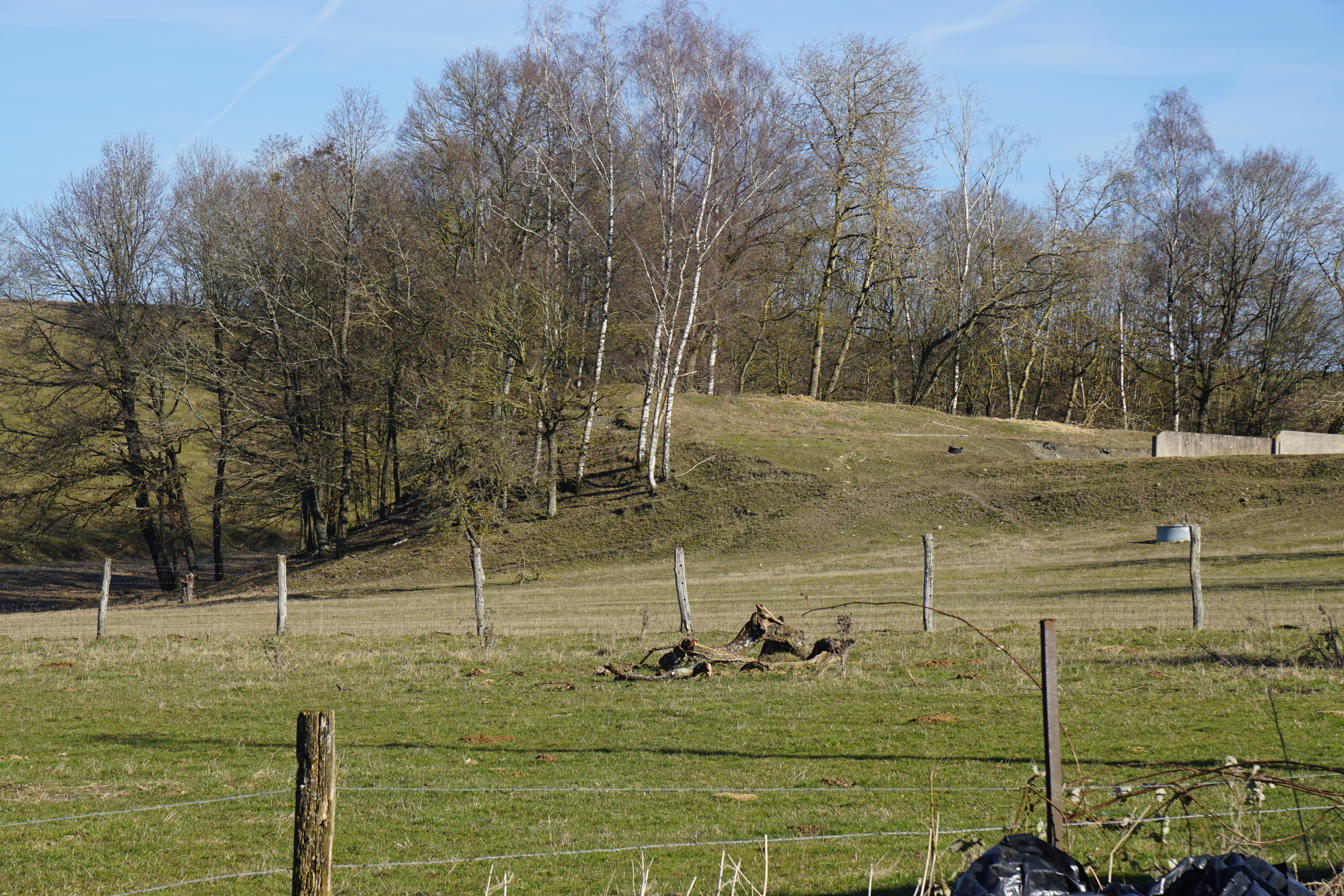
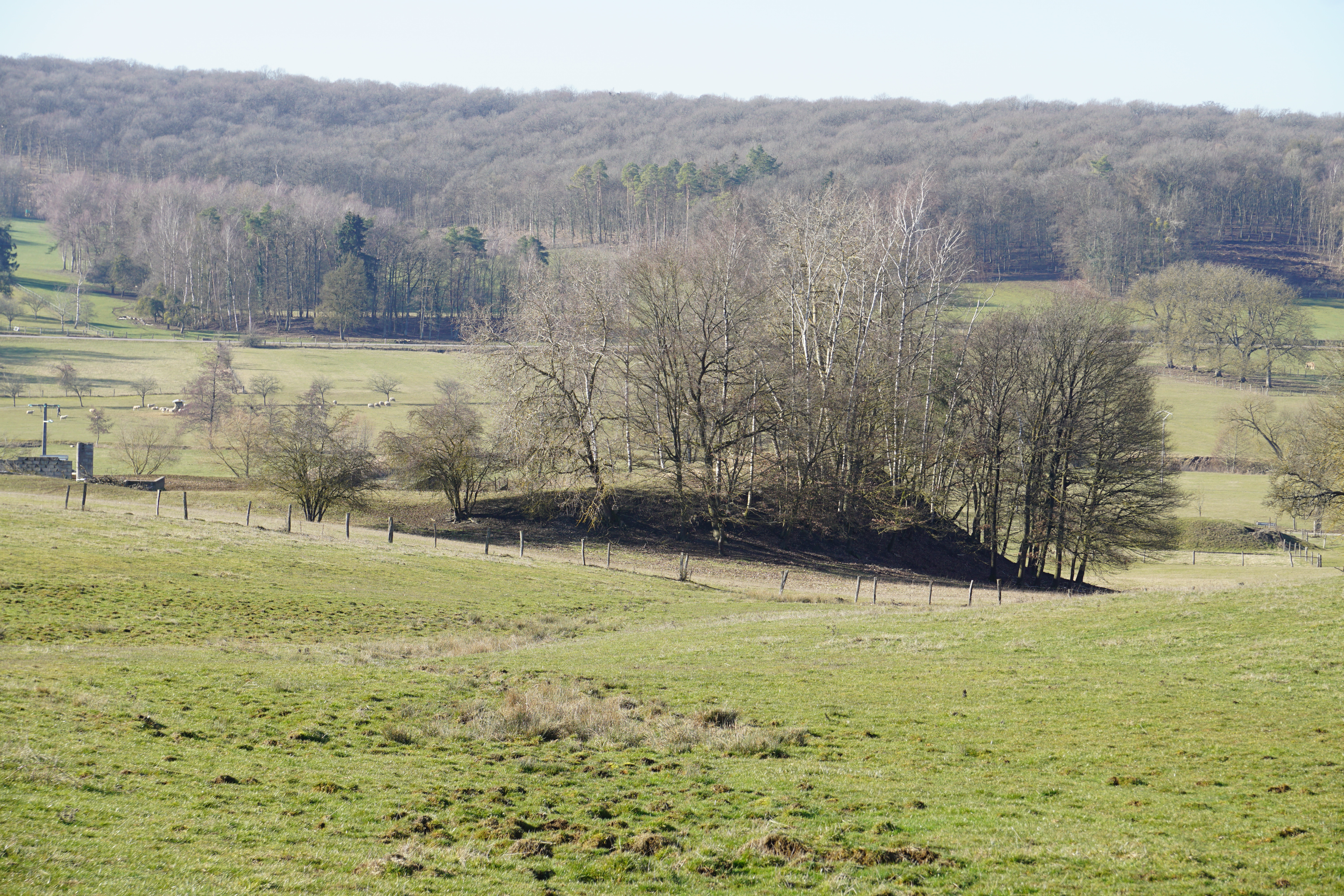

=== Bulgnéville concession ===
The Bulgnéville concession was granted on October 6, 1832. Several exploratory shafts and boreholes were drilled between 1837 and 1840, but they only encountered thin coal seams or none at all. No extraction took place, and the concession was relinquished on February 28, 1855.

=== Rozières-sur-Mouzon concession ===
Following exploratory work, the Rozières-sur-Mouzon concession was granted on October 29, 1845. Mining efforts were limited to one shaft, one exploration adit, and three reconnaissance galleries, but operations were abandoned in 1847. The concession was relinquished in 1852.

Mining remains of the concession

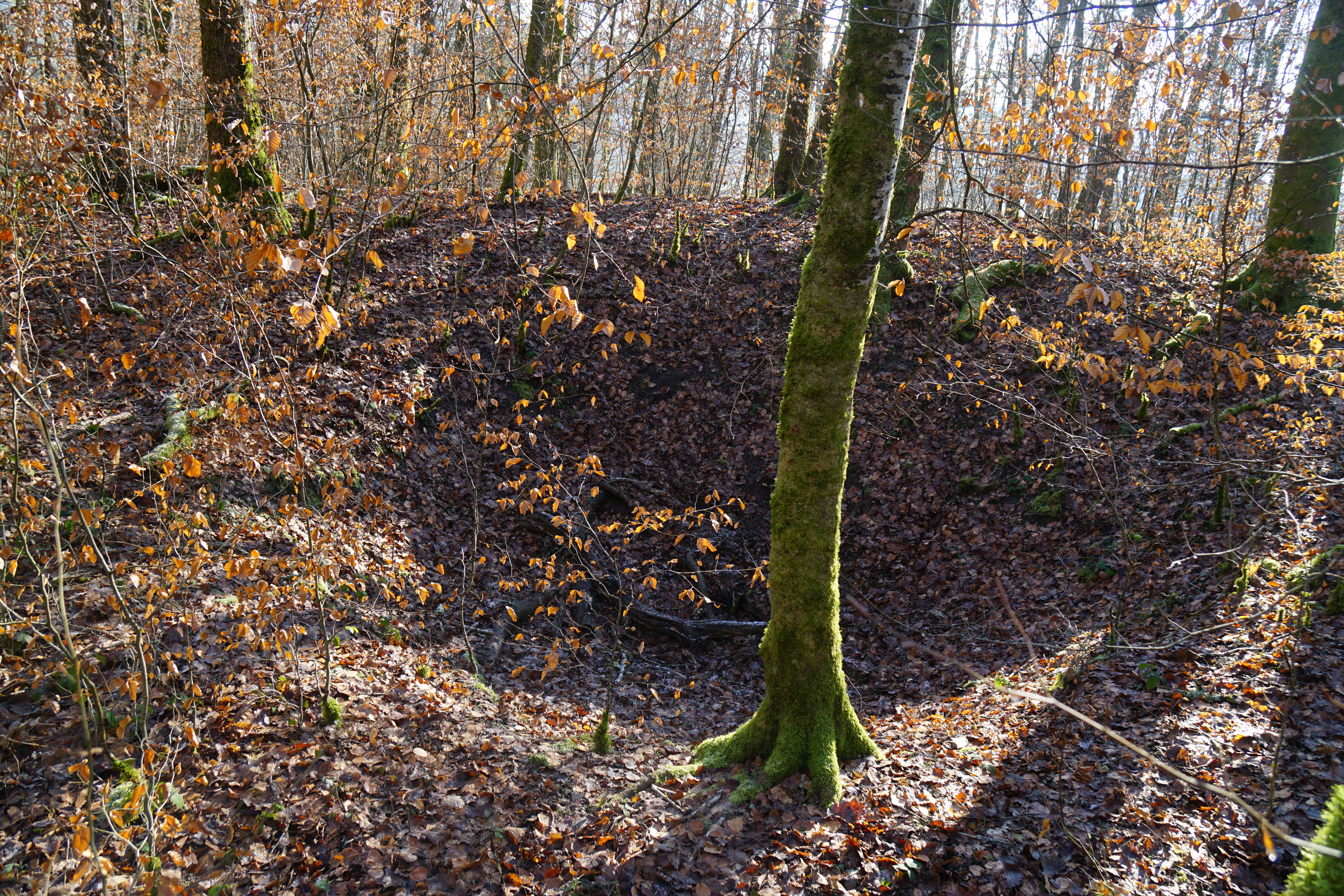
The funnel formed by the 1845 shaft.

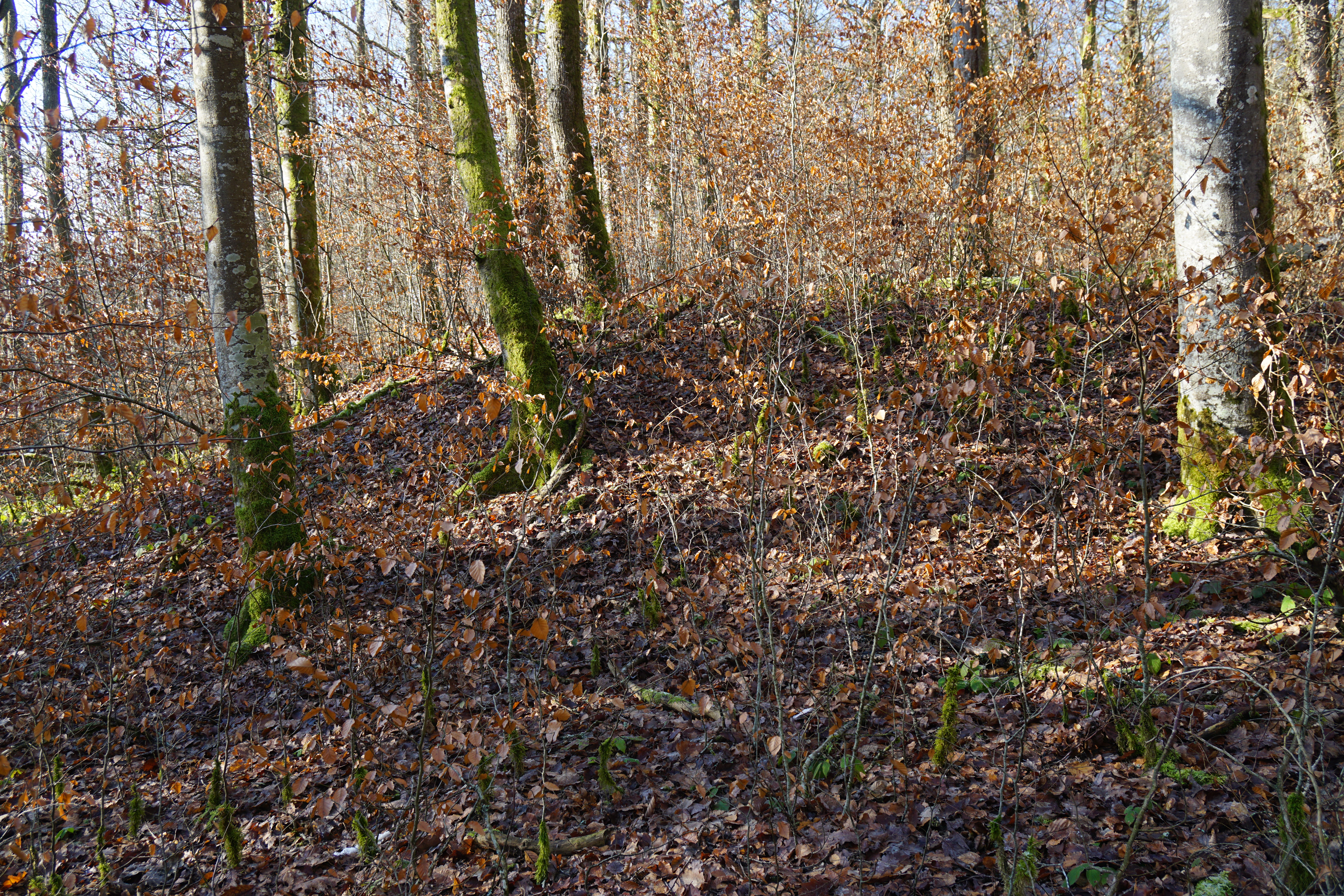
The slag heap from the same shaft.

=== Suriauville (Contrexéville) concession ===
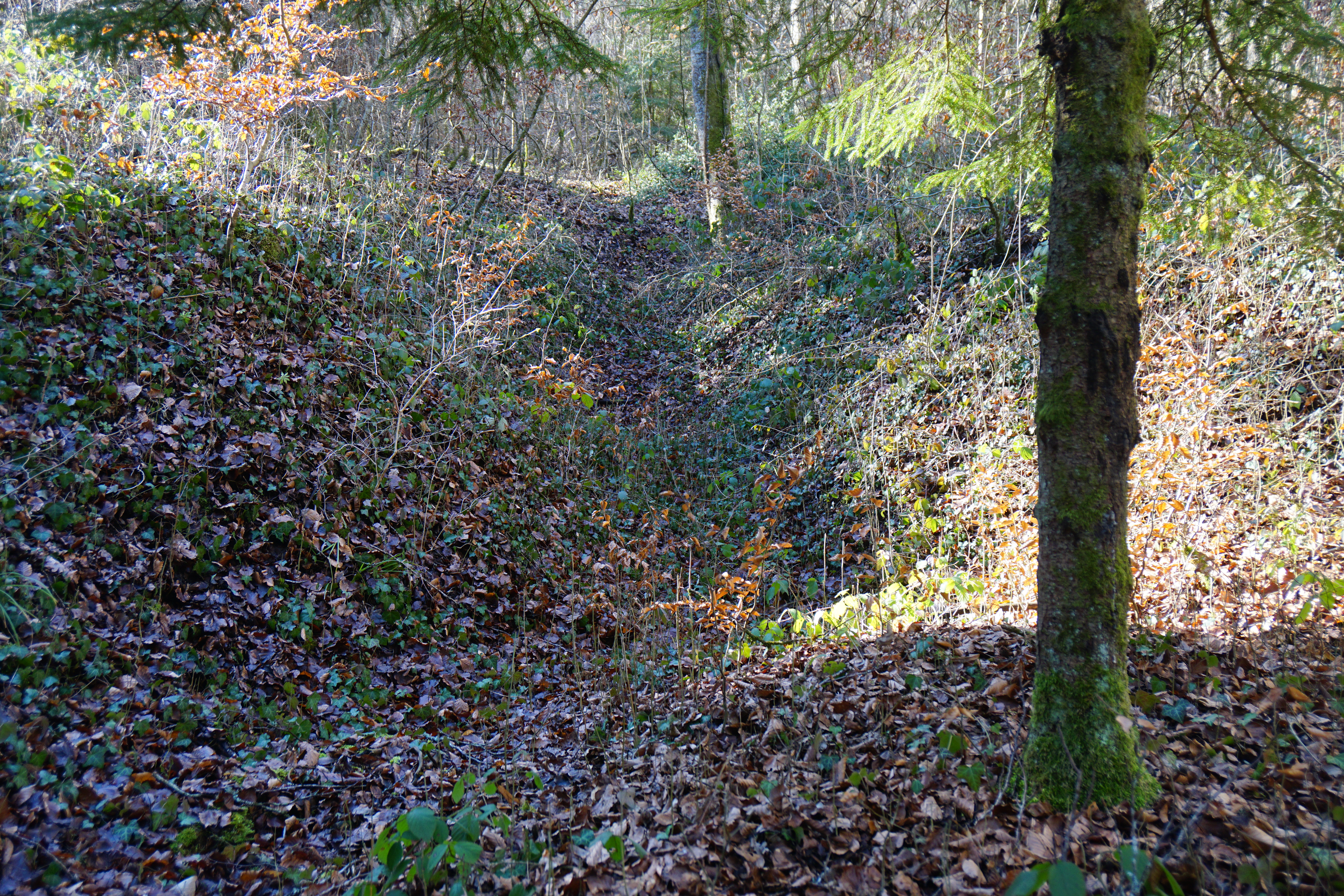
The blocked entrance to the Galerie Marie

==== First phase of mining ====
The Suriauville concession was granted on March 2, 1859. The main mining site was the Marie Adit, located halfway between Bulgnéville and Contrexéville. A 10-meter-deep shaft was dug in Crainvilliers, serving an adit that reached a 380-meter length by March 1877. Another shaft was dug around 1860 at La Rouillie. Approximately 2,000 tons of coal were extracted annually until mining operations ceased in 1901 or 1903. The concession was revoked on June 29, 1923.

==== Second phase of mining ====
After excavations in August 1942, a new adit was dug 35 meters north of the former Marie Adit. An attempt to mine using a 25-meter-long retreat mining technique was unsatisfactory, leading to the method being abandoned. The coal seam, which measured 60 cm near the outcrops, thinned out in the central section of the works before stabilizing at 30 to 35 cm. Monthly production increased from 150 tons at the start of 1943 to 300 tons in November and December of that year. At that time, the mine employed around fifty miners.

By February 1946, operations were conducted on behalf of the Mougeot paper mill in Laval-sur-Vologne. Monthly production ranged from 1,000 to 1,200 tons, with a workforce of 95 workers, including 34 German prisoners of war. Coal extraction was performed using jackhammers, and transport was carried out with Decauville minecarts, which were hauled to the surface by a winch. The electric drainage system had a capacity of 20 m^{3}/h but could reach 120 m^{3}/h during rainy periods. The production cost was 1,800 francs per ton—more than double the selling price of coal from Gemmelaincourt. This high cost was due to the use of compressed air, the width of the galleries (which allowed for oversized mine carts but in insufficient numbers), poorly executed drainage, and the expensive rental of equipment.

Production peaked in 1947, with 13,383 tons extracted that year. Coal mining ceased in 1948 in favor of gypsum extraction from the same geological layer for plaster manufacturing. This activity eventually ended in 1952.

==== Remains and historical memory ====
The mining remains.

Since the 2000s, the Contrexéville Local Studies Circle has maintained the site and organizes guided tours during heritage days, along with exhibitions.

Remains of the 1940s adit

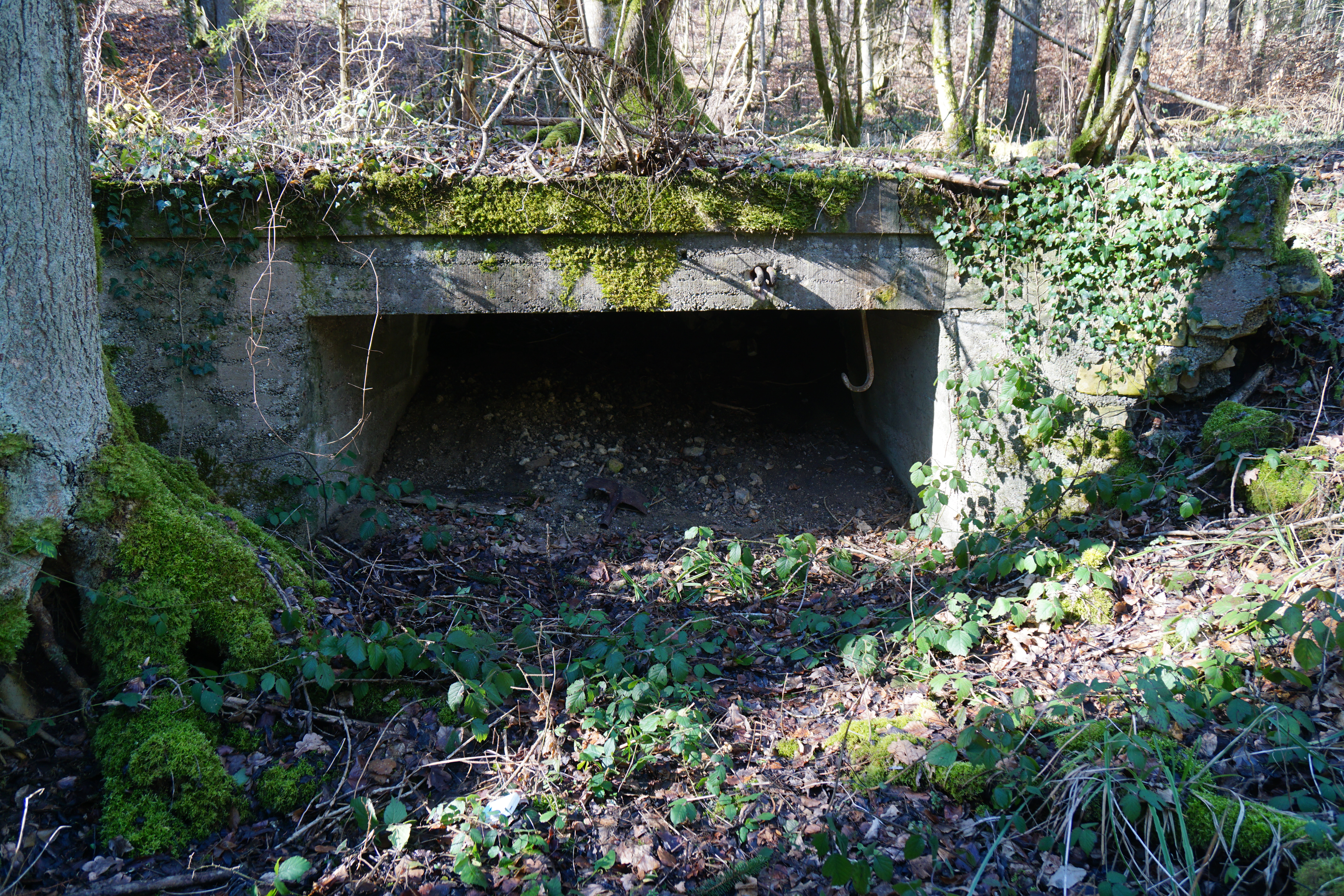
The concrete entrance to the tunnel.

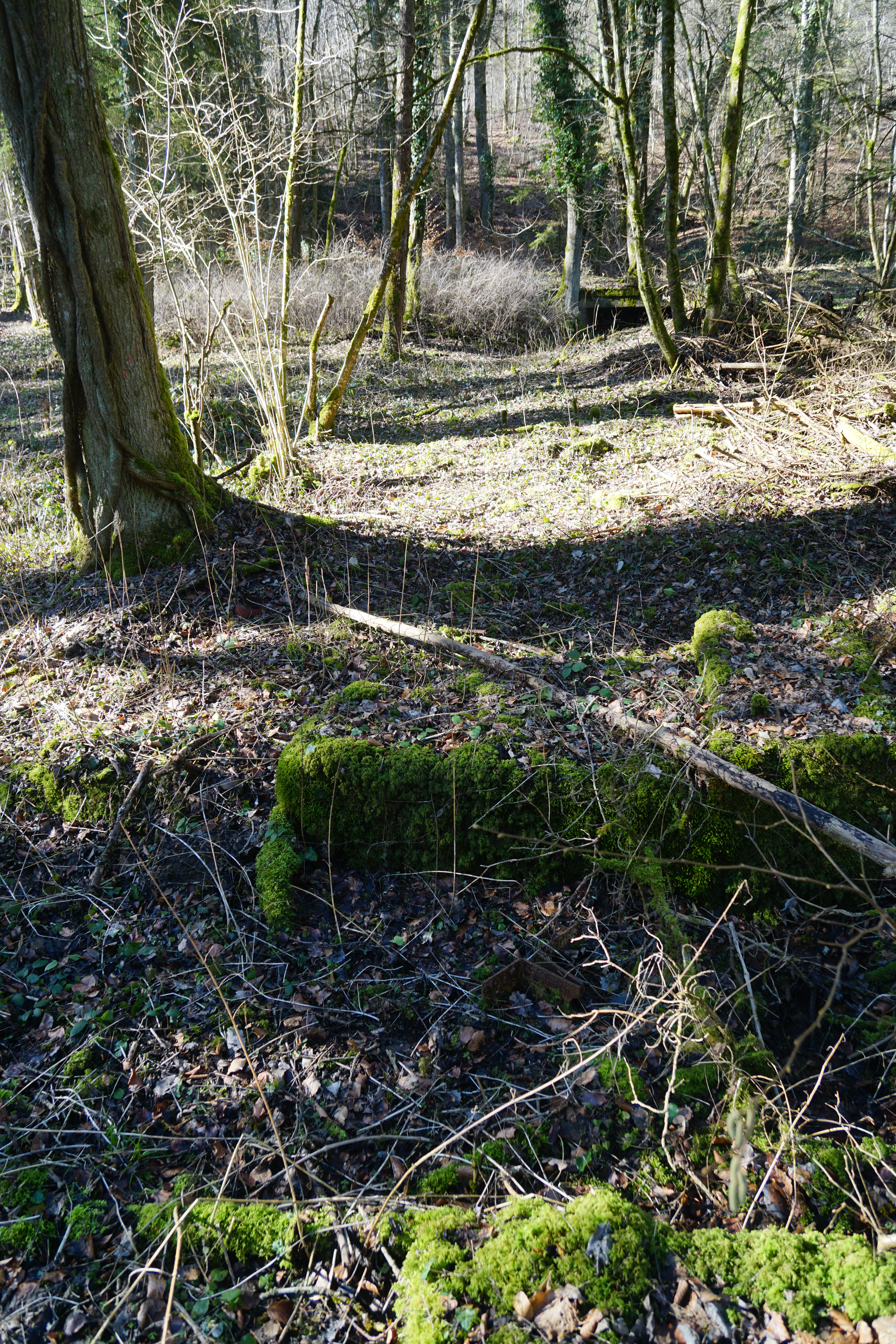
Location of the winch.

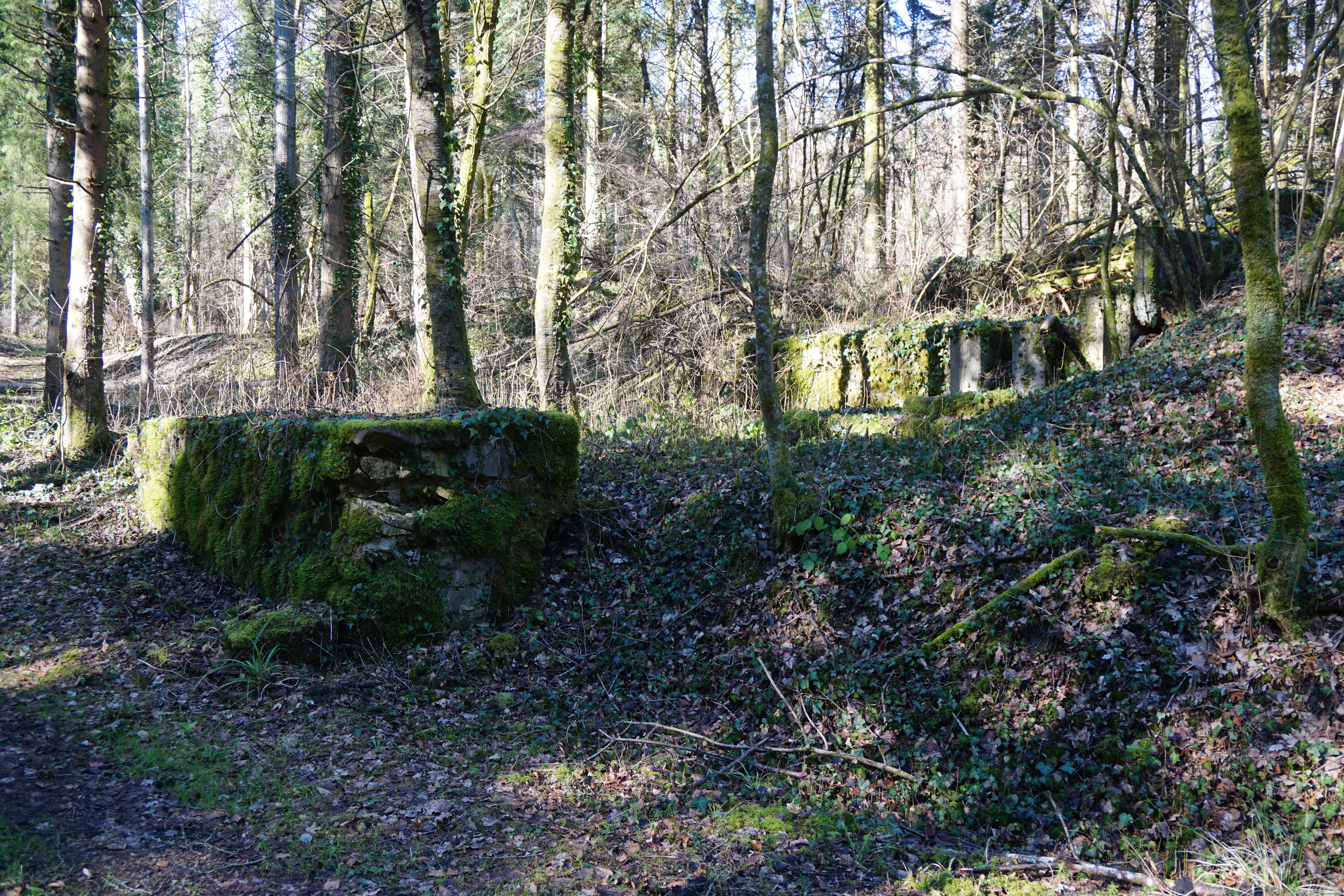
The ruins of the buildings.

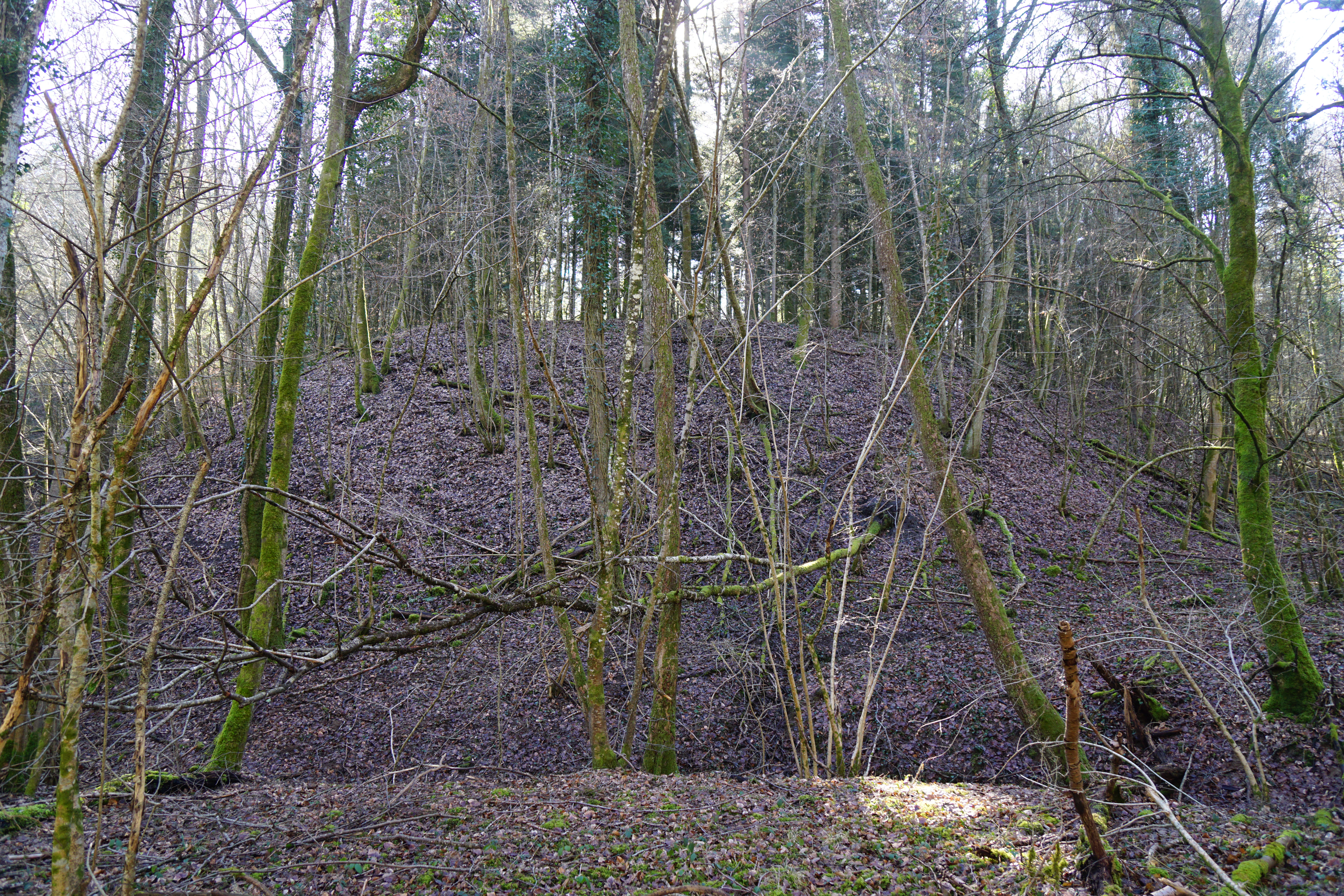
Top of the slag heap.

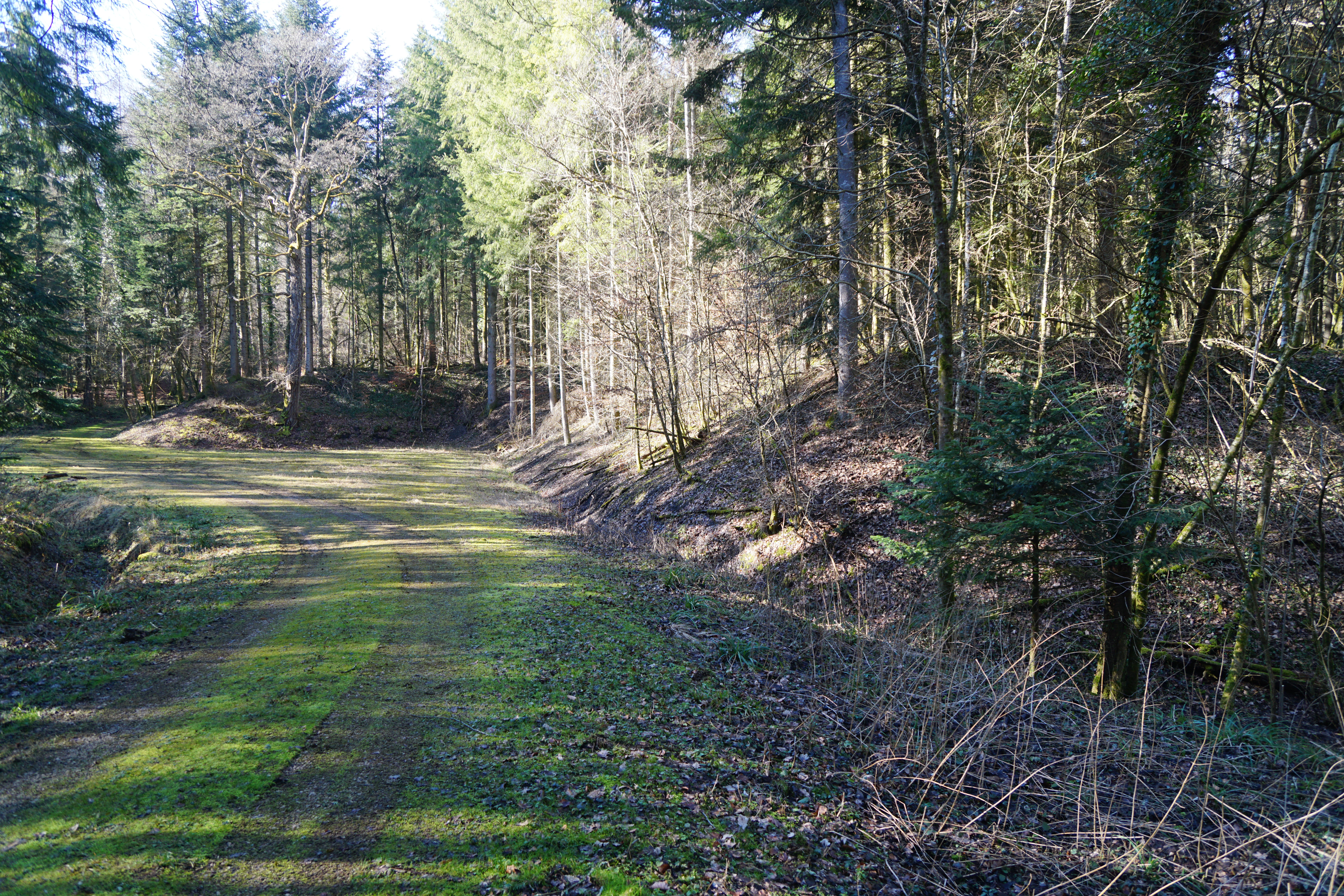
The slag heap from the parking lot.

== See also ==
- Vosges and Jura coal mining basins
- Haute-Saône Keuperian coalfield

== Bibliography ==
- Mining engineers (1837). Compte-rendu des travaux des ingénieurs des mines en 1836 : 3. Bassin des Vosges [Report on the work of mining engineers in 1836: 3. Vosges Basin] (in French). Paris: Imprimerie royale, Ministère du commerce et des travaux publics, direction générale des ponts et chaussées et des mines. p. 12.
- Servier, M (1859). Bulletin trimestriel : Notes géologiques sur les mines de charbon de Norroy (Vosges) [Quarterly bulletin: Geological notes on the coal mines of Norroy (Vosges)] (in French). Vol. 4. Saint-Étienne: Société de l'industrie minérale. pp. 384–398.
- Dormois, R (1944). Houille triasique du département des Vosges [Triassic coal of the Vosges department] (PDF) (in French). BRGM.
- Ricours, J; Minoux, G (1946). Projet complémentaire de recherche de houille triasique dans la région de Vittel-Mirecourt (Vosges) [Complementary project for the search for Triassic coal in the Vittel-Mirecourt region (Vosges)] (PDF) (in French). BRGM.
