= Mikoyan (disambiguation) =

Mikoyan is a Russian aircraft manufacturer. The name may also refer to:

== People ==
- Anastas Mikoyan (1895–1978), Old Bolshevik and Soviet statesman, elder brother of Artem Mikoyan
- Artem Mikoyan (1905–1970), Soviet aircraft designer of Armenian descent, younger brother of Anastas Mikoyan
- Ivan Mikoyan (1927–2016), Soviet aircraft designer, son of Anastas Mikoyan
- Sergo Mikoyan (1929–2010), Soviet historian, son of Anastas Mikoyan
- Stepan Mikoyan (1922–2017), Soviet test pilot, Hero of the Soviet Union, son of Anastas Mikoyan
- Stas Namin (born Anastas Alekseyevich Mikoyan, 1951–), Russian-Armenian musician, composer, record producer, promoter and businessman, grandson of Anastas Mikoyan

== Places ==
- Mikoyan Bay in Severnaya Zemlya, Krasnoyarsk Krai, Russia
- Yeghegnadzor (previously Mikoyan), the capital of Vayots Dzor Province, Armenia
