= Stalingrad (1990 film) =

- Original film poster
- Directed by: Yuri Ozerov
- Written by: Yuri Ozerov; Ron Nelson
- Produced by: Clarence Avant; Quincy Jones; George Jackson
- Starring: Powers Boothe; Mikhail Ulyanov; Bruno Freindlich; Fernando Allende; Sergei Garmash
- Narrated by: Artiom Karapetian
- Cinematography: Igor Slabnevich; Vladimir Gusev
- Edited by: Svetlana Metelitsa; Svetlana Ivanova
- Music by: Yuri Levitin
- Production companies: Mosfilm(USSR); DEFA (GDR); Barrandov Studios(Czech); Warner Bros. (US)
- Release date: February 1990
- Running time: 196 minutes (combined)
- Countries: Soviet Union; Czechoslovakia; East Germany; United States
- Languages: Russian; German
- Budget: $2,500,000

Stalingrad (Russian: Сталинград) is a 1990 two-part war film written and directed by Yuri Ozerov, and produced by Quincy Jones and Clarence Avant. Revolving around the eponymous Battle of Stalingrad, the film was a co-production between the Soviet Union and East Germany. It stars an ensemble cast featuring Powers Boothe, Mikhail Ulyanov, Bruno Freindlich, Fernando Allende, Sergei Garmash, Nikolai Kryuchkov, and Ronald Lacey.

== Plot ==
=== Film I ===
In January 1942, Adolf Hitler appoints Fedor von Bock to command Army Group South and supervise Operation Blau. The German forces advance in the south of Russia, scattering the Soviets and approaching Stalingrad, that seems on the verge of falling to the enemy's hands. The movie ends with Vasily Chuikov assuming command of the 62nd Army at September.

=== Film II ===
The Germans attack Stalingrad, and are engaged in close-quarters combat within the city. Chuikov's soldiers manage to hold on to their positions; On 19 November 1942, the Red Army launches a successful counter-offensive and encircles the Wehrmacht formations. In February 1943, the German 6th Army surrenders to the Soviets.

== Production ==
The film was a sequel to Ozerov's 1985 Battle of Moscow, with its plot starting directly in the beginning of the former, after von Bock failed to capture Moscow. In general, Stalingrad was Ozerov's fourth work dealing with the Soviet-German War, after the 1970–71 series Liberation, the 1977 TV mini-series Soldiers of Freedom and Battle of Moscow.

Due to the harsh economic conditions in the late 1980s Soviet Union, Ozerov was unable to secure funding for his film inside the USSR. After deliberations, he approached the American Warner Brothers for assistance. The company agreed to provide financial support, but demanded that American actors would be given representation. The reluctant director had to cast Powers Boothe for the title role of General Vasily Chuikov. The film was the first Soviet-American co-production in the Perestroika era.

== Reception ==
The film was poorly received, and it was Ozerov's first work which failed to secure any nominations since 1958. In 1993, the director used footage from Stalingrad for the frame story of his last film, Angels of Death, about a sniper duel taking place during the battle for the city. Montage from Stalingrad was also included in two TV anthologies of select material from Ozerov's films, The Tragedy of the Twentieth Century and The Great Captain Georgy Zhukov.

== Cast ==
=== Soviet Union ===
- Powers Boothe as General Vasily Chuikov
- Mikhail Ulyanov as Marshal Georgy Zhukov
- Bruno Freindlich as Marshal Boris Shaposhnikov
- Fernando Allende as Lieutenant Rubén Ruiz Ibárruri
- Sergei Garmash as Sergeant Yakov Pavlov
- Liubomiras Laucevičius as General Kuzma Gurov
- Boris Nevzorov as General Nikolai Krylov
- Vadim Lobanov as Nikita Khrushchev
- Andrey Smolyakov as Lieutenant Leonid Khrushchev
- Archil Gomiashvili as Joseph Stalin
- Vladimir Troshin as Kliment Voroshilov
- Nikolai Zasukhin as Vyacheslav Molotov
- Stepan Mikoyan as Anastas Mikoyan
- Viktor Uralsky as Mikhail Kalinin
- Nikolai Kryuchkov as old captain
- Fyodor Bondarchuk as sniper Ivan
- Nikolai Simkin as Alexander Poskrebyshev
- Vyacheslav Ezepov as Alexander Shcherbakov
- Valeri Tzvetkov as General Andrey Yeryomenko
- Vitali Rastalnoi as Marshal Semyon Timoshenko
- Evgeni Burenkov as General Aleksandr Vasilevsky
- Aleksandr Goloborodko as General Konstantin Rokossovsky
- Sergei Nikonenko as General Alexander Rodimtsev
- Oksana Fandera as Natasha

=== Germany ===
- Horst Schulze as Erich Edgar Schulze
- Gerd Michael Henneberg as Field Marshal Wilhelm Keitel
- Günter Junghans as Harro Schulze-Boysen
- Achim Petri as Adolf Hitler
- Erich Thiede as Heinrich Himmler
- Ernst Heise as Field Marshal Fedor von Bock
- Boris Levkovich as Colonel Hermann

Ronald Lacey makes an appearance as Winston Churchill.
