= Marcel Fournier =

Marcel Fournier may refer to:

- Marcel Fournier (legal historian) (1856–1907), French legal historian
- Marcel Fournier (sociologist) (born 1945), Canadian sociologist
