= Saint-Merd-de-Lapleau =

- Commune
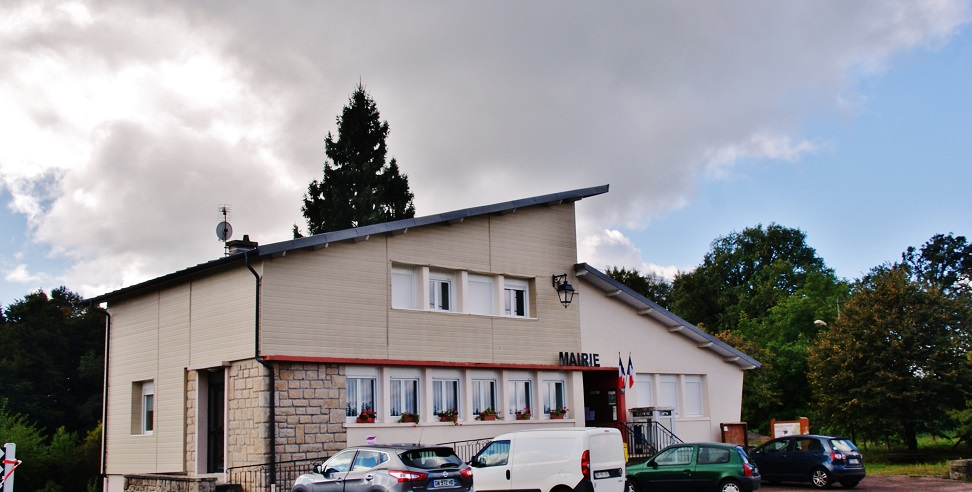
- Town hall
- Location of Saint-Merd-de-Lapleau
- Location within France Location within Nouvelle-Aquitaine
- Coordinates: 45°15′28″N 2°04′57″E
- Country: France
- Region: Nouvelle-Aquitaine
- Department: Corrèze
- Arrondissement: Ussel
- Canton: Égletons

Government
  - Mayor (2020–2026): Marion Guichon
- Area^{1}: 24.5 km^{2} (9.5 sq mi)
- Elevation: 570 m (1,870 ft)
- Highest elevation: 610 m (2,000 ft)
- Lowest elevation: 251 m (823 ft)
- Population (2023): 205
  - Density: 8.37/km^{2} (21.7/sq mi)
- Time zone: UTC+01:00 (CET)
  - Summer (DST): UTC+02:00 (CEST)
- INSEE/Postal code: 19225 /19320
- ^{1} French Land Register data, which excludes lakes, ponds, glaciers > 1 km^{2} (0.386 sq mi or 247 acres) and river estuaries.

Saint-Merd-de-Lapleau (French pronunciation: [sɛ̃ mɛʁ də laplo], literally Saint-Merd of Lapleau; Occitan: Sent Merd de la Pléu) is a commune in the Corrèze department in central France.

== Population ==
Historical population
| Year | Pop. | ±% p.a. |
|---|---|---|
| 1968 | 292 | — |
| 1975 | 213 | −4.41% |
| 1982 | 194 | −1.33% |
| 1990 | 156 | −2.69% |
| 1999 | 140 | −1.20% |
| 2007 | 130 | −0.92% |
| 2012 | 188 | +7.66% |
| 2017 | 174 | −1.54% |
| 2023 | 205 | +2.77% |
Source: INSEE

== Notable people ==
- Antoine Jourde (1848–1923), socialist politician, born in Saint-Merd

== See also ==
- Communes of the Corrèze department
