= Antoine Jourde =

French politician

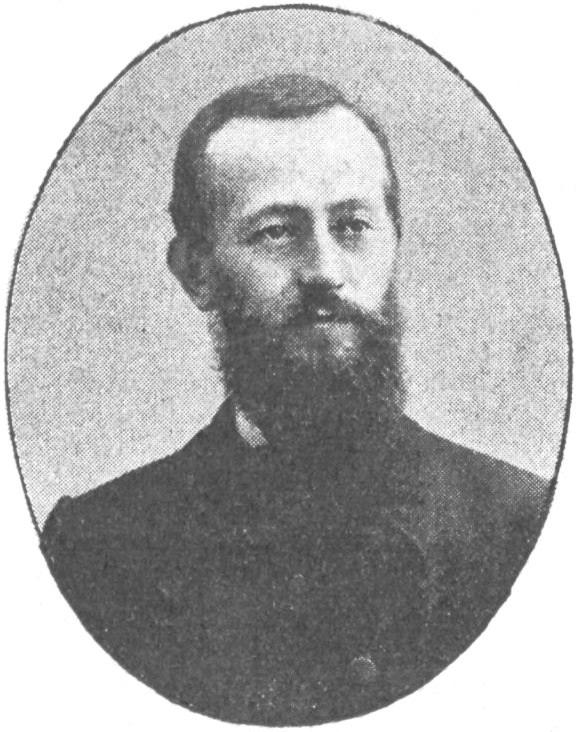
- Antoine Jourde in 1898

Deputy for Gironde
- In office 6 October 1889 – 31 May 1910

Personal details
- Born: 23 September 1848 Saint-Merd-de-Lapleau, Corrèze, France
- Died: 30 January 1923 (aged 74) Caudéran, Bordeaux, Gironde, France
- Occupation: Politician

Antoine Jourde (23 September 1848 – 30 January 1923) was a French politician. He was born into a peasant family and worked in an umbrella factory, a flower shop and for a wine dealer among other jobs. He was elected as a Boulangist and socialist, and was the author or co-author of over 20 proposed laws. During the Dreyfus affair he was against Dreyfus at first, but changed his mind when evidence of forgery of evidence against Dreyfus emerged. He was active in the French Freemasonry movement.

== Early years ==
Antoine Jourde was born on 23 September 1848 in Saint-Merd-de-Lapleau, Corrèze. His family were Corrèze peasants. Jourde went to primary school, then began work at the age of 14 in an umbrella factory in Angers. During the Franco-Prussian War of 1870–71 he served as a sergeant in the army of General Joseph Vinoy. A bullet wounded him in the chest on 19 September 1870 at Villejuif and he was taken prisoner by the Germans. He escaped on 19 January 1871 and rejoined his regiment. He was decorated with the military medal, and from 1871 to 1874 was adjutant at the Prytanée National Militaire, a secondary school in La Flèche for students interested in a military career.

Jourde was initiated as a Freemason in 1876. In 1877 he married Berthe Michaud and helped with her flower shop on the Rue Porte Dijeau in Bordeaux. He was then hired as a trade representative for the Buisson fils wine dealer. He was director of the Girondin Warehouses Exchange and editor of the Voix du Peuple. In 1885 he founded a Freemasons lodge named "Le grand progrès social". He separated from his wife, but supported his two daughters and son properly, and helped his son become director of litigation in Nogent-sur-Marne.

== Political career ==
Jourde was a far-left activist, but had no personal fortune to start a political career. The opportunity came with the September–October 1889 legislative elections, when the conservative monarchists helped election of radical Boulangists. In the 1889 elections he was one of three Boulangists affiliated with the French Workers' Party (POF: Parti ouvrier français), the others being Christophe Thivrier of Allier and Ernest Ferroul of Narbonne. He remained active in the POF until the late 1890s. Jourde was elected to the Chamber of Deputies for 3rd constituency of Bordeaux, Gironde. on 6 October 1889. He ran as a republican socialist Boulangist candidate, and defeated the incumbent Fernand Faure in the second round of voting. He was opposed to the parliamentary regime and in favor of a constituent assembly to revise the constitution. During the 1892 municipal elections Jourde and François Aimelafille tried to organize the socialists to defend the interests of the workers against the republicans, but failed.

In the 1893 elections Jourde ran as an independent socialist, and was elected with difficulty. He was reelected in the second round on 3 September 1893, again running against Fernand Faure. In his second term Jourde was again in favor of a referendum, a single chamber, progressive tax on income over 3,000 francs, a pension fund for workers, repeal of the law against the Socialist International and other measures. He succeeded in a law to make the minutes of the Chamber available for sale to the public. He proposed to tax the operations of the bourse. He declared himself in favour of giving all people the right to live through work. He was in favour of unifying all retirement pensions, and took part in all discussions concerning labour laws. Jourde was the most nationalist of the Guesdists, and at one point proposed that foreign workers should be banned from France, an idea that was alien to Guesde and to the POF. He said, "the day when employers are obliged to pay foreign workers the same salary as they pay our nationals ... our people will prefer to hire Frenchmen rather than foreigners." He was very active in debates, and sat in many committees including those on the army and social welfare and insurance. He was secretary of the Chamber from 1897 to 1899.

In 1898 Jourde's campaign was funded by the Federal Socialist Committee of Bordeaux. He was reelected in the first round on 8 May 1898. He was strongly criticized by the Nouvelliste and by the Bordeaux edition of l'Intransigeant of Paris for his lack of firm conviction and his attempts to bribe the mayor Camille Cousteau^{(fr)}. On 7 July 1898 he voted with the house to post the speech of General Cavaignac on the Dreyfus affair. (Note: Cavaignac was Minister of War when he read a document in the chamber that definitely incriminated Captain Alfred Dreyfus. On 30 August 1898 Cavaignac said he had found the document to be a forgery by Colonel Henry, but refused to support revision of the prosecution of Dreyfus, whom he continued to insist was guilty.) On 5 June 1899 Jourde stated that he felt deep regret for this, and to repair what he called his "error and foolishness" he voted to halt the judgement of the Court of Cassation referring Dreyfus to the Rennes War Council. By the 1902 elections Jourde had lost his former popularity with the workers, while his opponent Albert Dormoy^{(fr)} had won a reputation as a paternalistic philanthropist while an engineer for the Chemins de fer du Midi railway company. On 11 May 1902 Jourde was defeated in the second round by Dormoy. On 20 May 1906 he defeated Dormoy in the second round to regain his seat. He was made a Chevelier of the Legion of Honour in 1913. On 26 April 1914 he was decisively defeated and abandoned politics.

Jourde was a member of the council of the Grand Orient de France from 1903 to 1906, member of the Grand College of Rites from 1913 to 1919, member of the "La Française" lodge and the "Neuf Soeurs Réunis Orient de Bordeaux". Antoine Jourde died on 30 January 1923 in Caudéran, now part of Bordeaux, Gironde. He had no religious views and was buried in a civil ceremony.

== Publications ==
Antoine Jourde was author or co-author of various proposed laws (PDL):

- Henri Aimel; Antoine Jourde; Jules Léveillé (1890), Projet de résolution tendant à ce que la Chambre se réunisse le Vendredi de chaque semaine pour s'occuper spécialement des questions ouvrières (1890 #548), Paris: Motteroz, p. 3
- Henri Aimel; Antoine Jourde (1890), PDL: d'accorder aux enfants adultérins ou incestueux des droits égaux à ceux qui sont attribués par le Code civil aux enfants simplement naturels présentée par MM. Albert Chiché, Henri Aimel et Jourde,... (28 juin 1890.) (1890 #742), Paris: Motteroz, p. 3
- Henri Aimel; Antoine Jourde; Francis Laur (1890), PDL: d'effacer l'inscription des condamnations sur les casiers judiciaires au bout d'un certain temps et dans certaines conditions (1890 #703), Paris: Motteroz, p. 2
- Henri Aimel; Antoine Jourde (1890), PDL: modifier le règlement du travail dans les prisons (1890 #922), Paris: Motteroz, p. 2
- Antoine Jourde; Charles-Ange Laisant; Pierre Richard (1890), PDL: l'admission des officiers d'infanterie, de cavalerie, d'artillerie et du génie à la pension proportionnelle de retraite (1890 #383), Paris: Motteroz, p. 3
- Henri Aimel; Antoine Jourde (1890), PDL: compléter la loi du 11 janvier 1881 sur la marine marchande et à proroger ladite loi pour une période de dix ans (1890 #539), Paris: Motteroz, p. 3
- Henri Aimel; Antoine Jourde (1891), PDL: modifier les dispositions de l'article 6 de la loi du 30 janvier 1872 relativement à la taxe payée par les navires pour frais de quai (1891 #1288), Paris: Motteroz, p. 4
- Antoine Jourde (1891), PDL: ouvrir au Ministre de l'Intérieur, un crédit extraordinaire de 40 000 francs pour secours aux ouvriers victimes de la fermeture de la distillerie de Saint Remi, quartier de Bacalan à Bordeaux, présentée par MM. Albert Chiché, Jourde et Henri Aimel,... (10 mars 1891.) (1891 #1283), Paris: Motteroz, p. 3
- Henri Aimel; Antoine Jourde (1891), PDL: 1 ° de décider qu'à l'avenir, on devra toujours insérer dans les cahiers des charges de tous les travaux adjugés pour le compte de l'Etat, des départements et des communes une clause interdisant aux adjudicataires ou concessionnaires de faire travailler plus de huit heures par jour et une clause fixant un minimum de salaire; 2 ° de créer des ateliers régionaux directement exploités par l'Etat pour la fabrication des articles d'équipement de l'armée et de la marine; 3 ° de réglementer les conditions du travail à bord des navires de commerce (1891 #1426), Paris: Motteroz, p. 6
- Henri Aimel; Antoine Jourde; Charles Le Senne; Jules Léveillé (1891), PDL: compléter les prescriptions de l'article 190 du Code d'instruction criminelle (1891 #1140), Paris: Motteroz, p. 2
- Antoine Jourde (1892), PDL: sur les accidents dont les marins et les mariniers sont victimes dans l'exercice de leur profession (1891 #1785 rectifié), Paris: Motteroz, p. 3
- Henri Aimel; Antoine Jourde (1892), PDL: fonder la liberté communale en réformant la loi municipale du 5 avril 1884 (1892 #2075), Paris: Motteroz, p. 173
- Antoine Jourde; Paul Lafargue (1893), PDL: règlementer le travail des femmes avant et après l'accouchement et à instituer des caisses de maternité (1892 #2369), Paris: Motteroz, p. 3
- Henri Aimel; Antoine Jourde (1893), PDL: la saisie-arrêt des salaires ou appointements des ouvriers et employés (1895 #2608), Paris: Motteroz, p. 3
- Henri Aimel; Antoine Jourde (1893), PDL: compléter les dispositions de la loi du 25 juin 1841 prohibant la vente aux enchères des marchandises neuves (1893 #2620), Paris: Motteroz, p. 5
- Antoine Jourde (1893), PDL: suspendre les droits de douane sur les issues de grains (Art. 165 du tarif douanier (1893 #2896), Paris: Motteroz, p. 2
- Henri Aimel; Antoine Jourde (1893), PDL: la composition du jury... présentée par MM. Albert Chiché, Henri Aimel et Jourde,... (24 octobre 1892.) (1892 #2361), Paris: Motteroz, p. 4
- Antoine Jourde (1897), PDL: modifier la loi du 27 février 1894 sur les droits de douanes... [21 mai 1897], Paris
- Antoine Jourde (1897), PDL: modifier la loi du 27 février 1894, sur les droits de douanes et d'accorder une remise de 0 fr. 35 par quintal métrique de céréales importées à nos commerçants sous la condition de les faire cribler sur les quais (1897 #2442), Paris: Motteroz, p. 3
- Antoine Jourde (1899), PDL: modifier les articles 38 et 52 de la loi du 3 juillet 1877 relative aux réquisitions militaires (1899 #612), Paris: Impr. de Motteroz, p. 3
- Antoine Jourde (1899), PDL: abrogation de l'article 2 de la loi du 1er février 1899 (nos 171, vins; 84, raisins de vendanges et moûts; et 173 bis, boissons non dénommées), tableau A annexé à la loi de douane du 11 janvier 1892 (1899 #922), Paris: Impr. de Motteroz, p. 10
- Auguste Gervais; Antoine Jourde (1901), PDL: joindre les cacaos aux autres produits coloniaux de consommation compris dans la loi du 24 février 1900 (tarif général et tarif minimum) (1901 #2220), Paris: Impr. de Motteroz, p. 2

== Sources ==
- Antoine Jourde (in French), Assemblée nationale
- Antoine Jourde (1848–1923) (in French), BnF: Bibliotheque nationale de France
- Bertrand, Alphonse (1893), "JOURDE (Antoine)", La chambre de 1893: biographies des 581 députés avec avertissement et documents divers, la liste des ministeres qui se sont succéde en France depuis 1871, la liste alphabétique des députés, etc (in French), Librairies-imprimeries réunies
- Chisholm, Hugh, ed. (1911), "Cavaignac, Louis Eugène" , Encyclopædia Britannica, vol. 5 (11th ed.), Cambridge University Press, pp. 560–561
- Herpin, Jacqueline (1998), "JOURDE Antoine 1848–1923", in Guillaume, Sylvie (ed.), Dictionnaire des parlementaires d'Aquitaine sous la Troisième République (in French), Presses Univ de Bordeaux, ISBN 978-2-86781-231-6
- Jolly, Jean (1960–1977), "Jourde, Antoine", Dictionnaire des parlementaires français de 1889 à 1940 (in French), Presses universitaires de France
- Steenson, Gary P. (1991-06-15), After Marx, Before Lenin: Marxism and Socialist Working-Class Parties in Europe, 1884–1914, University of Pittsburgh Pre, ISBN 978-0-8229-7673-8
- Stuart, Robert (2006), Marxism and National Identity: Socialism, Nationalism, and National Socialism during the French Fin de Siecle, SUNY Press, ISBN 978-0-7914-8227-8
