= Marcel Fournier (legal historian) =

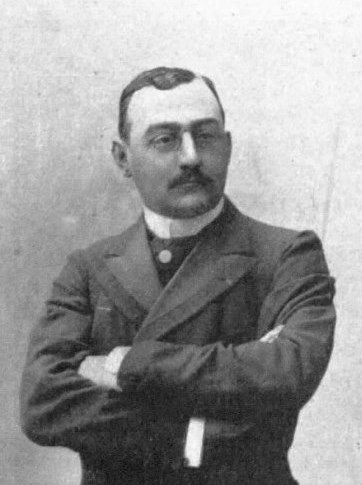
Fournier in Henri Avenel, La Presse française au vingtième siècle, Paris, Flammarion, 1901.

Pierre Joseph Marcel Fournier (13 October 1856 - 15 March 1907 ·) was a French legal historian. He is most notable for founding the Revue politique et parlementaire in 1894 and serving as its editor in chief until 1901, when he was replaced by Fernand Faure. He began the 'Grand cercle républicain' and was its first secretary general.

== Life ==
Born in Bordeaux, he graduated from the École nationale des chartes in 1881 with an archiviste paléographe diploma, for which he wrote the thesis De l'affranchissement et de la condition des affranchis dans la Gaule franque (On emancipation and on the condition of the emancipated in Frankish Gaul). Also in 1881 he gained a doctorate from Paris's Faculty of Law, with the thesis this time entitled Essai sur l'histoire du droit d'appel (Essay on the history of the law of appeal).

In 1885 he wrote Essai sur les formes et les effets de l'affranchissement dans le droit gallo-franc He was a Moderate Republican and from 1902 to early 1906 director of the Enregistrement. He died in Meudon.

== Bibliography ==
- (in French) "Marcel Fournier. In: Bibliothèque de l'école des chartes. 1907, vol. 68. pp. 234-235". persee.fr (in French).
