= Sergo Mikoyan =

Soviet and Russian historian (1929–2010)

- Сергo Микоян; Սերգո Միկոյան
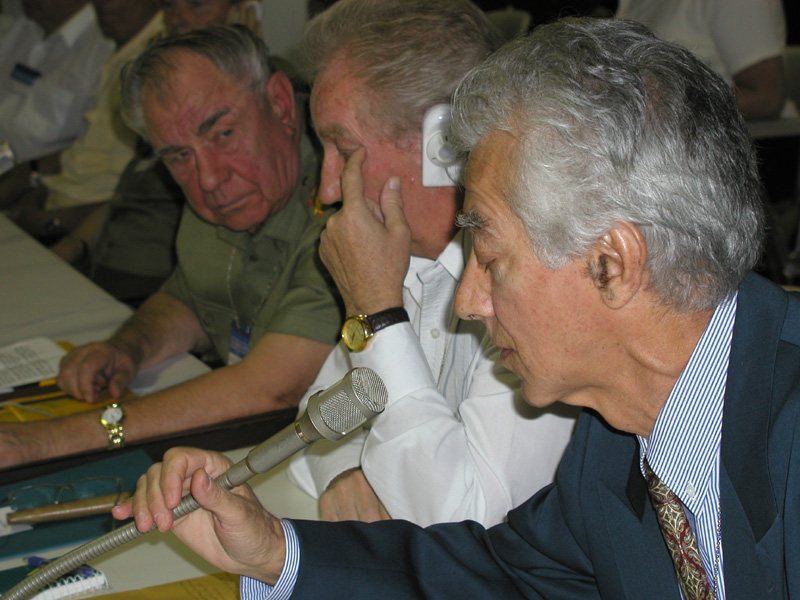
- Sergo Mikoyan (speaking at the microphone) at the 40th Anniversary Conference of the Cuban Missile Crisis, Havana, October 2002
- Born: June 5, 1929; Moscow, Soviet Union
- Died: March 7, 2010 (aged 80); Moscow, Russian Federation
- Education: Moscow State Institute of International Relations
- Known for: Editor for Latinskaya Amerika
- Awards: Order of Merit for Distinguished Service; Commander (Peru)
- Scientific career
- Fields: Latin American Studies; Southeast Asian studies
- Workplaces: Institute for World Economic and International

Sergo Anastasi Mikoyan (Armenian: Սերգո Անաստասի Միկոյան; Russian: Сергo Анаста́сович Микоян; June 5, 1929 – March 7, 2010) was a Russian and Soviet historian of Armenian descent. He was a leading specialist in the foreign policies of the Soviet Union and the United States in Latin America. He was the son of Anastas Mikoyan, an Old Bolshevik and high level Soviet statesman who served as a close advisor to Soviet premier Nikita Khrushchev.

== Early life and education ==
Mikoyan was born to Ashkhen and Anastas Mikoyan in Moscow on June 5, 1929. He joined the Communist Party in 1953. In 1952, he graduated from the Moscow State Institute of International Relations. Mikoyan continued to live in Moscow until 1955. During the height of the Cuban Missile Crisis in October 1962, Mikoyan accompanied his father Anastas Mikoyan, as his executive secretary, to Cuba in high level negotiations with Fidel Castro and documented much of his father's private reminisces about the crisis. From 1970 onwards, he was the chief editor of the leading Soviet journal on Latin American affairs, Latinskaya Amerika, a Russian-language monthly. During perestroika, Mikoyan was also a prominent supporter of the Karabakh movement.

== Academic career ==
Beginning in the late 1980s, Mikoyan was a participant in several joint Soviet/Russian-American international conferences on the Cuban Missile Crisis including the Harvard University-sponsored conference at Cambridge, Massachusetts in October 1987, the Moscow conference in 1989, the Antigua conference in 1991, and the Havana conference in January 1992. He also participated in the 40th anniversary conference of the crisis held in October 2002. Mikoyan later became a chief researcher at the Institute of Peace at the Russian Academy of Sciences and held a professorship at Georgetown University.

After the dissolution of the Soviet Union in 1991, Mikoyan's research and the possession of his father's unpublished memoirs proved to be invaluable sources for Western scholars specializing in the history of the Cold War. American historians and journalists who have collaborated with Mikoyan include William Taubman, Jon Lee Anderson, Georgie Anne Geyer, and Irving Louis Horowitz. While the focus of Mikoyan's studies also included Asia, his work largely concentrated on leftist revolutionary movements in Latin America, most notably Cuba, and its leaders such as Fidel Castro and Che Guevara.

== Personal life ==
Mikoyan was married to Alla Kuznetsova, daughter of Alexey Kuznetsov, a victim of the Leningrad affair. Tragically, Kuznetsova died from leukemia in 1957, at the age of 29. Mikoyan himself died from leukemia in a Moscow clinic on March 7, 2010.

== Selected works ==
- Mikoyan, Sergo A.; Gantman, Vladimir I. (1969). США: Государство, Пoлитикa, Bыбopы [The USA: Government, Politics, Elections] (in Russian). Moscow: Юридическая литература.
- Mikoyan, Sergo A. (1984). СССР–Мексика: 60 лет сотрудничества [USSR–Mexico: 60 Years of Cooperation] (in Russian). Moscow: Международные отношения.
- Mikoyan, Sergo A. (1988). "Карибский кризис, каким он видится на расстоянии" [The Caribbean Crisis in Retrospect]. Latinskaya Amerika (in Russian) (1): 67–80.
- Mikoyan, Sergo A. (1992). "Stalinism As I Saw It". In Alec Nove (ed.). The Stalin Phenomenon. New York: St. Martin's Press. ISBN 978-0312095192.
- Mikoyan, Sergo A. (1992). "The Future of the Soviet-Cuban Relationship". In Wayne S. Smith (ed.). The Russians Aren't Coming: New Soviet Policy in Latin America. Boulder, CO: Lynne Rienner Publishers. ISBN 978-1555872700.
- Mikoyan, Sergo A. (2006). "Алексей Снегов в борьбе за «десталинизацию»" [Alexei Snegov in the Struggle for 'De-Stalinization']. Voprosy Istorii (in Russian) (4): 69–84.
- Mikoyan, Sergo A. (2006). Анатомия Карибского Кризиса [Anatomy of the Caribbean Crisis] (in Russian). Moscow: Академия. ISBN 5-87444-242-1.
- Mikoyan, Sergo A. (2007). Հայրս Անաստաս Միկոյանը [My Father Anastas Mikoyan] (in Armenian). Translated by Eduard Avagyan; Svetlana Avagyan. Yerevan: Նաիրի.
- Mikoyan, Sergo A. (2012). Svetlana Savranskaya (ed.). The Soviet Cuban Missile Crisis: Castro, Mikoyan, Kennedy, Khrushchev, and the Missiles of November. Washington, D.C.: Woodrow Wilson Center Press. ISBN 9780804762014.

== Bibliography ==
- Blight, James G.; Allyn, Bruce J.; Welch, David A. (2002). Cuba on the Brink: Castro, the Missile Crisis, and the Soviet Collapse. Lanham, MD: Rowman & Littlefield. ISBN 0-7425-2269-5.
- Garthoff, Raymond L. (2001). A Journey Through the Cold War: A Memoir of Containment and Coexistence. Washington, D.C.: Brookings Institution. ISBN 0-8157-0102-0.
- Hambardzumyan, Viktor, ed. (1981). "Միկոյան, Սերգո Անաստասի". Soviet Armenian Encyclopedia (in Armenian). Vol. 7. Yerevan: Armenian Academy of Sciences.
- Horowitz, Irving L. (1995). Cuban Communism. New Brunswick: Transaction Publishers. ISBN 0-88738-794-2.
- Malkasian, Mark (1996). Gha-ra-bagh!: The Emergence of the National Democratic Movement in Armenia. Detroit: Wayne State University Press. ISBN 0-8143-2605-6.
- Mikoyan, Stepan A. (1999). Stepan Anastasovich Mikoyan: An Autobiography. Translated by Aschen Mikoyan. Shrewsbury: Airlife Publishing. ISBN 1-85310-916-9.
- Shakarian, Pietro A. (2025). Anastas Mikoyan: An Armenian Reformer in Khrushchev's Kremlin. Bloomington: Indiana University Press. ISBN 978-0253073556.
