= Jiří Pelikán (politician) =

Czech politician (1923–1999)

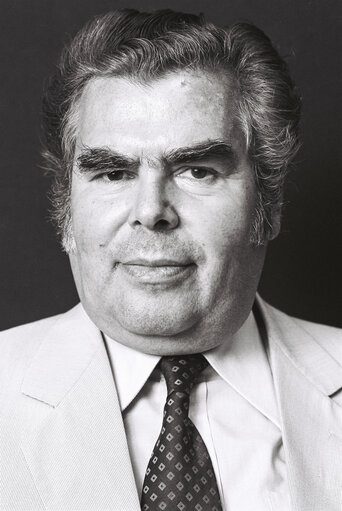
Portrait of Jiří Pelikán

Jiří Pelikán (7 February 1923 – 26 June 1999) was a Czech journalist and politician. Born in Olomouc, he was a member of the National Assembly in the Czechoslovak Socialist Republic and later a member of the European Parliament for the Italian Socialist Party (PSI). In 1939, Pelikán joined the Communist Party of Czechoslovakia (KSČ) in exile and took part in the Czech resistance to Nazi Germany occupation during World War II. From 1953 to 1963, he assumed leading functions in the KSČ-led International Union of Students. Until 1968, he was the director of the Czechoslovak Television and a member of the parliament from 1964 to 1969.

Pelikán fully supported the Prague Spring and organized the first live debate in common with the Austrian television ORF. When the troops of the Warsaw Pact entered Prague on 20 August 1968, he organized the resistance among journalists. In 1969, he fled the Gustáv Husák regime and was given political asylum in Italy. He was elected to the European Parliament for the PSI in 1979 and again in 1984. After the Velvet Revolution of 1989, he became a member of the Consultative Council of the then Czech president Václav Havel from 1990 to 1991. He died in Rome in 1999 after a long battle with cancer.

== Bibliography ==
- F. Caccamo, Jiří Pelikán a jeho cesta socialismem 20. století, Prague 2008, ISBN 978-80-7239-226-1
- "Inventario del Fondo Jiri Pelikan", in: Quaderni dell'Archivio storico 8, Rome 2003
- Jiří Pelikán, Io, esule indigesto. Il Pci e la lezione del ’68 di Praga, ed. Antonio Carioti, Milan 1998, ISBN 978-88-317-0599-8
- Jiří Pelikán (ed.), Feux croisés sur le stalinisme: par des socialistes, les dissidents, des eurocommunistes, Paris, Revue politique et parlementaire, 1980, ISBN 2-85702-011-2
- Jiří Pelikán, Il fuoco di Praga. Per un socialismo diverso, Milan, Feltrinelli, 1978
- Jiří Pelikán, Socialist Opposition in Eastern Europe: The Czechoslovak Example, Palgrave Macmillan, 1976, ISBN 978-0-312-73780-1
- Jiří Pelikán (ed.), Civil and Academic Freedom in the USSR and Eastern Europe, Nottingham: Spokesman Books, 1975, ISBN 978-0-85124-113-5
- Jiří Pelikán, S'ils me tuent, Paris, Grasset, 1975, ISBN 978-2-246-00282-6
- Jiří Pelikán (ed.), The Czechoslovak Political Trials, 1950-54: Suppressed Report of the Dubcek Government's Commission of Inquiry, 1968, Macdonald, 1971, ISBN 978-0-356-03585-7 (2nd ed. Stanford University Press, 1975, ISBN 978-0-8047-0769-5)
- Jiří Pelikán (transl. by G. Theiner and D. Viney), The Secret Vysocany Congress: Proceedings and Documents of the Extraordinary Fourteenth Congress of the Communist Party of Czechoslovakia, 22 August 1968, A. Lane, 1971, ISBN 978-0-7139-0156-6
