= Anastas Mikoyan =

Soviet statesman and revolutionary (1895–1978)

- Анастас Микоян; Անաստաս Միկոյան
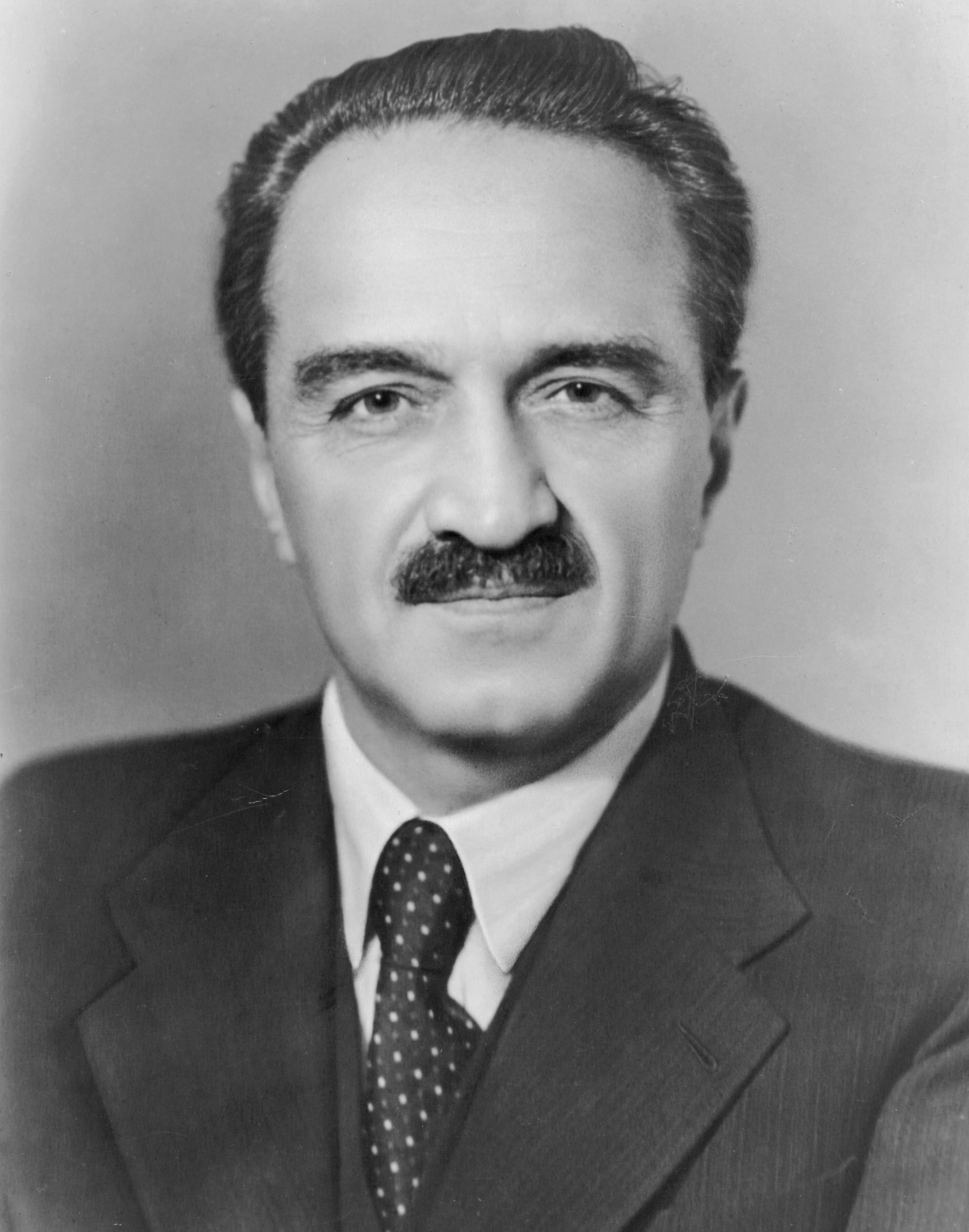
- Mikoyan in 1950

Chairman of the Presidium of the Supreme Soviet of the Soviet Union
- In office 15 July 1964 – 9 December 1965
- Premiers: Nikita Khrushchev; Alexei Kosygin
- Preceded by: Leonid Brezhnev
- Succeeded by: Nikolai Podgorny

First Deputy Chairman of the Council of Ministers of the Soviet Union
- In office 28 February 1955 – 15 July 1964
- Premiers: Nikolai Bulganin; Nikita Khrushchev
- Preceded by: Nikolai Bulganin
- Succeeded by: Alexei Kosygin
Additional positions
Deputy Chairman of the Council of Ministers of the Soviet Union
In office 27 April 1954 – 28 February 1955
Premier	Georgy Malenkov
In office 19 March 1946 – 5 March 1953
Premier	Joseph Stalin
Minister of Foreign Trade
In office 24 August 1953 – 22 January 1955
Premier	Georgy Malenkov
Preceded by	Dmitry Pavlov
Succeeded by	Basil Lark
In office 15 March 1946 – 4 March 1949
Premier	Joseph Stalin
Preceded by	Himself (as People's Commissar for Foreign Trade)
Succeeded by	Evgeny Chvyalev

Personal details
- Born: Anastas Hovhannesi Mikoyan; 25 November 1895 Sanahin, Russian Empire (now Armenia)
- Died: 21 October 1978 (aged 82) Moscow, Soviet Union
- Resting place: Novodevichy Cemetery, Moscow
- Party: CPSU (1918–1976)
- Other political affiliations: RSDLP (Bolsheviks) (1915–1918)
- Spouse: Ashkhen Tumanyan (m. 1921; died 1962)
- Children: Stepan; Vladimir; Aleksei; Vano; Sergo
- Education: Nersisian School; Gevorgian Seminary
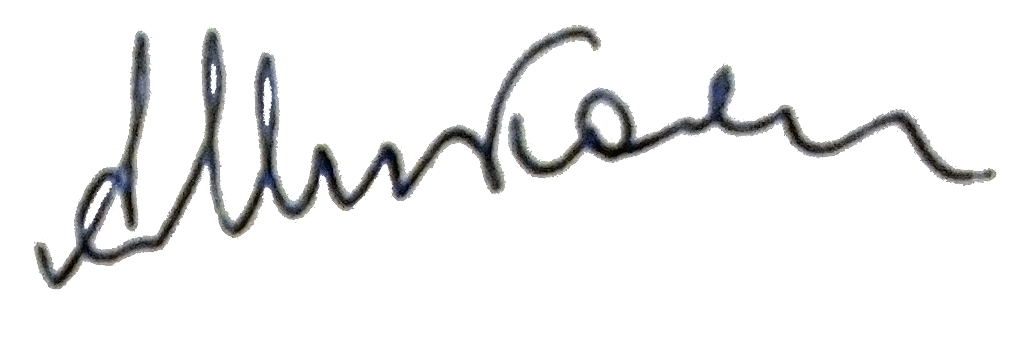
- Signature
- Central institution membership: 1942–1945: Member, State Defense Committee; 1935–1966: Full member, 17th, 18th, 19th, 20th, 21st, 22nd Politburo; 1926—1935: Candidate Member, 14th, 15th, 16th, 17th Politburo; 1923–1976: Full member, 12th, 13th, 14th, 15th, 16th, 17th, 18th, 19th, 20th, 22nd, 23rd, & 24th Central Committee of the Communist Party of the Soviet Union; Other offices held: 1938–45: People's Commissar for Foreign Trade; 1934–38: People's Commissar for Food; 1930–34: People's Commissar of Supplies; 1926–30: People's Commissar for Trade

Anastas Ivanovich Mikoyan (US: /ˌmiːkoʊˈjɑːn/; Russian: Анастас Иванович Микоян, IPA: [ɐnɐsˈtas ɨˈvanəvʲɪtɕ mʲɪkɐˈjan]; Armenian: Անաստաս Հովհաննեսի Միկոյան, romanized: Anastas Hovhannesi Mikoyan; 25 November [O.S. 13 November] 1895 – 21 October 1978) was a Soviet statesman, diplomat, and Bolshevik revolutionary. An ethnic Armenian, he served as the Chairman of the Presidium of the Supreme Soviet, the head of state of the Soviet Union. As a member of the Communist Party's Central Committee from 1923 to 1976, Mikoyan was the only Soviet politician who remained in power from Lenin, through the eras of Stalin and Khrushchev, to his retirement under Brezhnev. His longevity inspired the popular Russian saying "from Ilyich [Lenin] to Ilyich [Brezhnev] without heart attack and paralysis". (Note: Russian: От Ильича до Ильича без инфаркта и паралича.)

A native of Armenia's northern Lori region, Mikoyan joined the Bolsheviks in 1915, and following the October Revolution of 1917 participated in the Baku Commune. In the 1920s, he was the party's boss in the North Caucasus. Mikoyan was elected to the Politburo in 1935, served as foreign trade minister from 1926 to 1930 and again from 1938, and during World War II became a member of the State Defense Committee. After the war, Mikoyan began to lose favour, losing his position as minister in 1949 and being criticized by Stalin at the 19th Party Congress in 1952. Following Stalin's death in 1953, Mikoyan sided with Khrushchev, supported him against a failed coup in 1957, and played a leading role in crafting his de-Stalinization policy.

Under Khrushchev, Mikoyan played an important role in Soviet foreign policy, making several key trips to the United States and communist Cuba. He acquired an important stature on the international diplomatic scene, especially with his skill in exercising soft power to further Soviet interests. In 1964, Khrushchev was forced to step down in a coup that brought Brezhnev to power. Mikoyan briefly served as Chairman of the Presidium of the Supreme Soviet, the official head of state, from 1964 until his resignation in 1965.

== Early life and career ==
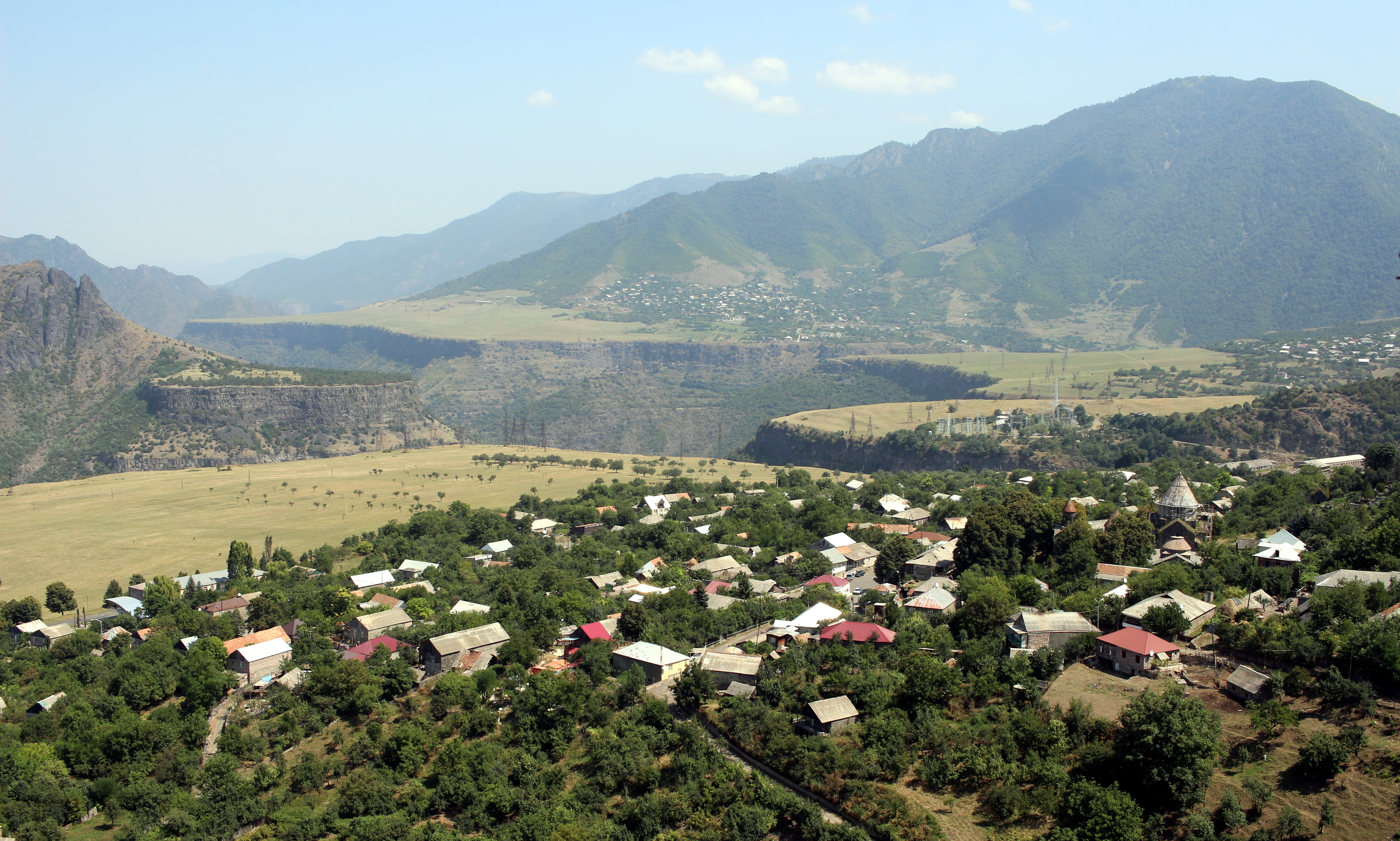
Sanahin, Mikoyan's native village, in the Debed River valley of Armenia

Mikoyan was born to Armenian parents in 1895 in the village of Sanahin, then part of the Tiflis Governorate of the Russian Empire (today part of Alaverdi in Armenia's Lori Province). His father, Hovhannes, was a carpenter and his mother, a rug weaver. He had one younger brother, Artem Mikoyan, who would be the co-founder of the MiG aviation design bureau, which became one of the primary design bureaus of fast jets in Soviet military aviation.

Mikoyan learned to read and write from a monk at the Sanahin Monastery. He received his formal education at the Nersisian School in Tiflis and the Gevorgian Seminary at Echmiadzin (Vagharshapat), both affiliated with the Armenian Apostolic Church. Religion, however, played an increasingly insignificant role in his life. He would later remark that his continued studies in theology drew him closer to atheism: "I had a very clear feeling that I didn't believe in God and that I had in fact received a certificate in materialist uncertainty; the more I studied religious subjects, the less I believed in God." Before becoming active in politics, Mikoyan had already dabbled in the study of liberalism and socialism.

After the outbreak of World War I, Mikoyan served in northern Iran in the 1st Armenian Volunteer Battalion of the Imperial Russian Army, led by General Andranik. In 1915, having become a convinced Marxist, Mikoyan formally joined the Bolshevik faction of the Russian Social Democratic Labour Party (later known as the Bolshevik Party). By the age of twenty, he had formed a workers' soviet at Echmiadzin and had become a leader of the revolutionary movement in the Caucasus.

== Baku Commune ==
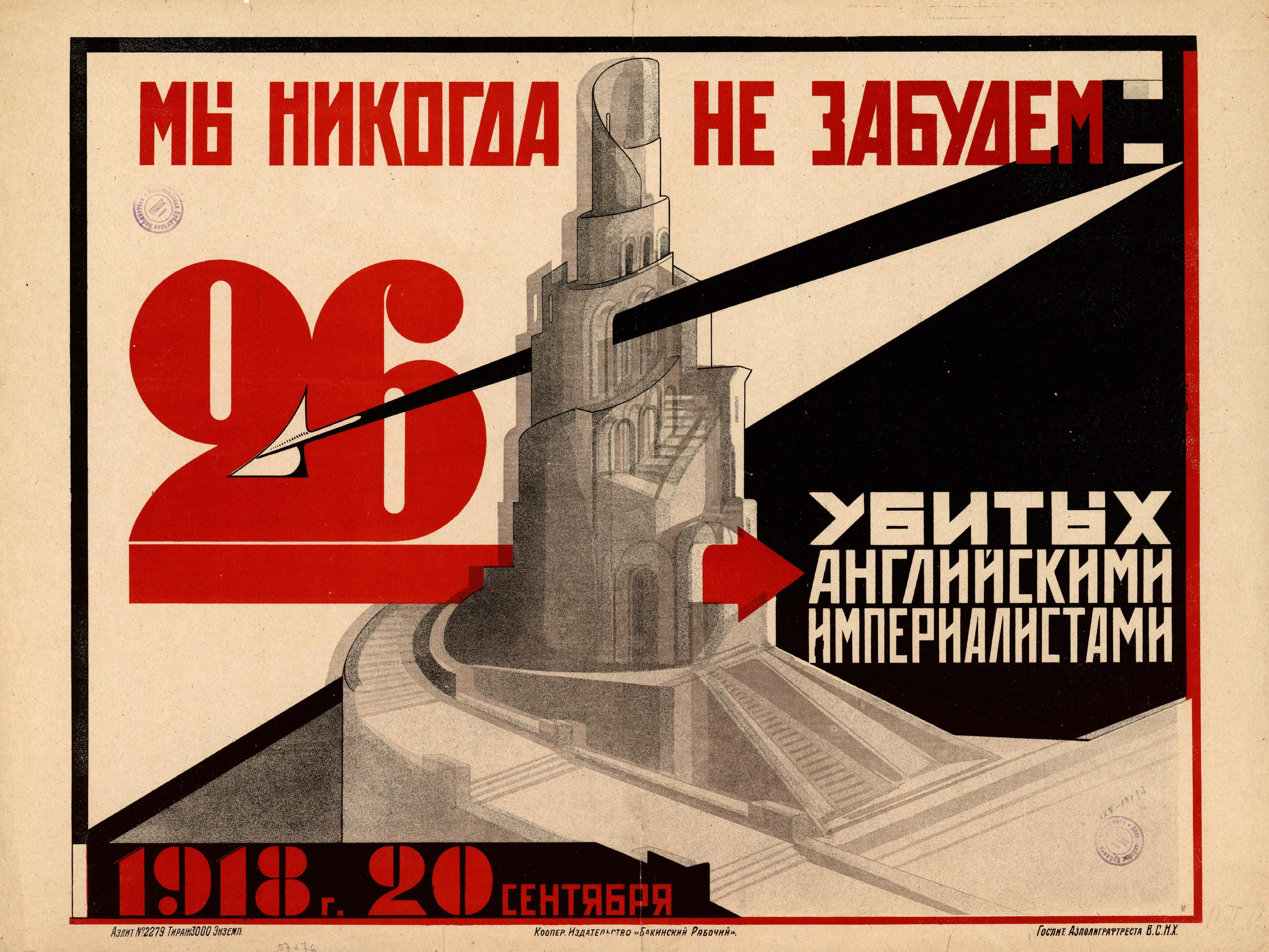
1925 Soviet poster: "We will never forget the 26 murdered by English imperialists. 1918, September 20."

Mikoyan's revolutionary activities led him to Baku, where he became the co-editor for the Armenian-language newspaper Sotsyal-Demokrat and later for the Russian-language paper Izvestia Bakinskogo Soveta. After the February Revolution, he and other Bolsheviks fought against anti-Bolshevik elements in the Caucasus. Mikoyan became a commissar in the newly formed Red Army. He was wounded in the fighting and was noted for saving the life of fellow Party member, Sergo Ordzhonikidze.

Mikoyan continued his Party work during the Russian Civil War, becoming one of the co-founders of the Baku Commune under the leadership of Stepan Shaumian. In Baku, he worked as the editor of the commune's official Armenian paper Teghekatu, and as the political commissar supervising its armed Armenian militia. He directed the seizure of the banks in April 1918, and the defence of Baku against the advancing Turkish army in July 1918.

After the fall of Baku, Shaumian and other Bolshevik leaders were arrested by the Centrocaspian Dictatorship. A commando unit, led by Mikoyan, organized their escape from prison, and they fled across the Caspian Sea to Krasnovodsk (today Türkmenbaşy in present-day Turkmenistan). However, at Krasnovodsk they were arrested by the Transcaspian Government, which was controlled by the British-allied Socialist Revolutionaries. The SR authorities executed the 26 Baku commissars, including Shaumian, on 20 September 1918 in the Turkmen desert. It was only by accident that Mikoyan avoided their fate. As American journalist Harrison Salisbury wrote:

Had Mikoyan's name been on a list of the party leaders as it properly should have been he would have been held, as was Shaumian, and would have been executed with him—there would have been twenty-seven, not twenty-six commissars executed. By that simple accident Mikoyan escaped and Shaumian did not. All his life Mikoyan was to wonder over this accident, feeling somehow at fault that he had lived while his beloved leader, Shaumian, and his other comrades had died.

After his release in February 1919, Mikoyan returned to Baku and resumed his activities there. These included helping establish the Baku Bureau of the Caucasus Regional Committee (kraikom).

== Politburo member ==
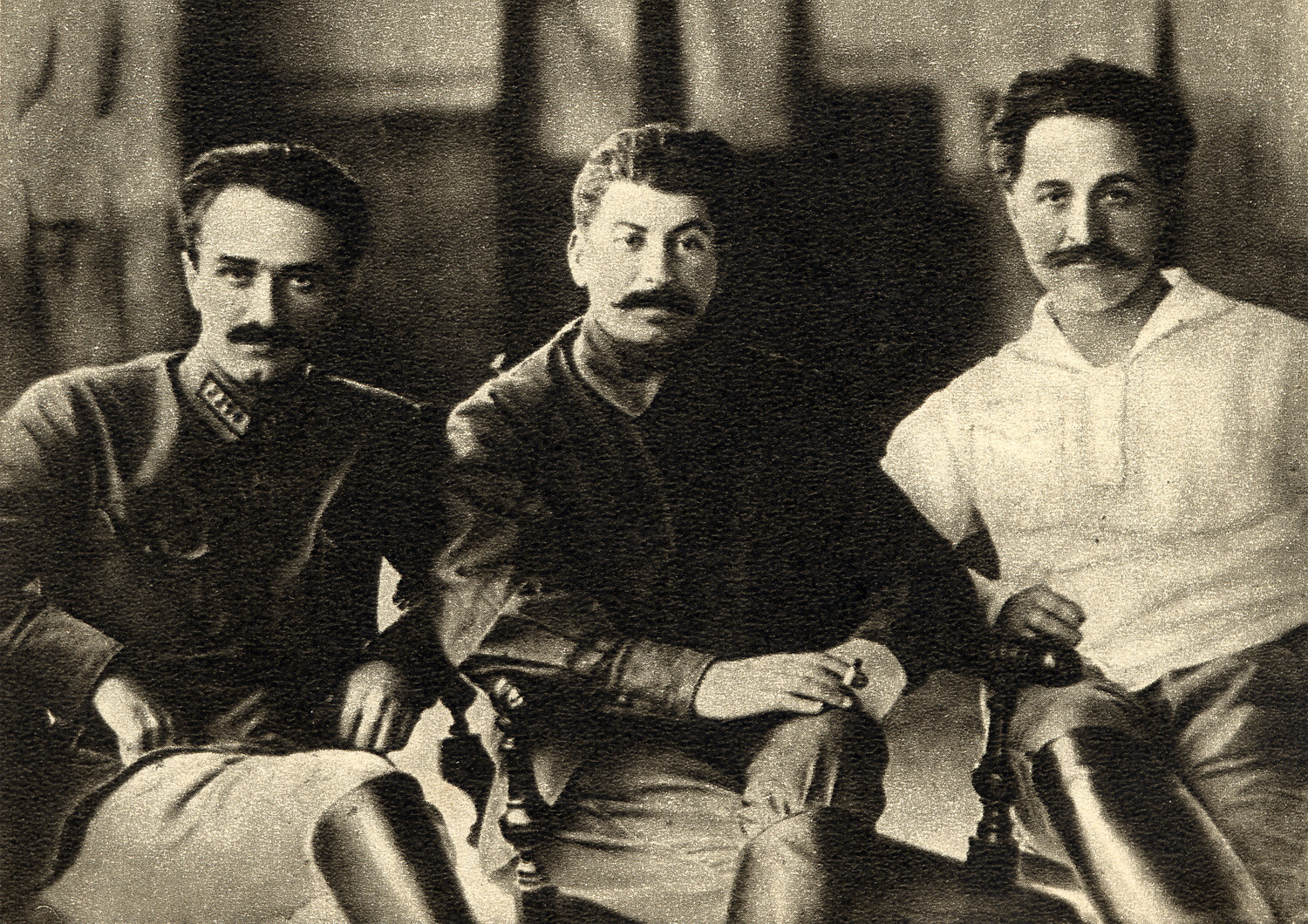
The Caucasus trio in 1925. From left to right: Mikoyan, Joseph Stalin and Sergo Ordzhonikidze

At the suggestion of Lenin, the Central Committee assigned Mikoyan to the party organization in Nizhny Novgorod in September 1920. From 1922 to 1926, during the era of the New Economic Policy, he served as the Secretary of the South East Bureau of the Communist Party and its successor, the North Caucasus kraikom. It was in that position that Mikoyan advocated granting autonomous status to Chechnya.

Mikoyan was elected to the Central Committee in 1923 and remained a member of that body for more than 50 years. In the power struggle that followed Lenin's death in 1924, Mikoyan supported Stalin, whom he had first met in 1919. During the 11th Congress of the CPSU, in 1922, before the power struggle between Stalin and Leon Trotsky had broken out into the open, Mikoyan characterised Trotsky as "a man of the state but not of the party". According to Trotsky's biographer, Isaac Deutscher, by saying that, "he summed up what many members of the Old Guard thought but did not yet utter in public."

As People's Commissar for External and Internal Trade from 1926, he imported ideas from the West, such as the manufacture of canned goods. In 1935 he was elected to the Politburo and was one of the first Soviet leaders to pay goodwill trips to the United States in order to boost economic cooperation. In the summer of 1936, Mikoyan spent two months in the U.S., where he not only learned more about its food industry but also met and spoke with Henry Ford and U.S. Secretary of State Cordell Hull. When he returned, Mikoyan introduced a number of popular American consumer products to the Soviet Union, including American hamburgers, ice cream, corn flakes, popcorn, tomato juice, grapefruit and corn on the cob.

Mikoyan spearheaded a project to produce a home cookbook, which would encourage a return to the domestic kitchen. The result, The Book of Tasty and Healthy Food, was published in 1939. Later, during the Khrushchev era, Mikoyan encouraged Aram Piruzyan, the head of Soviet Armenia's food industry, to develop a similar book on Armenian cuisine, entitled Armenian Cooking, which became a hit with Soviet readers. Mikoyan also helped initiate the production of ice cream in the USSR and kept the quality of ice cream under his own personal control until he was dismissed. Stalin once joked about this, stating, "You, Anastas, care more about ice cream, than about communism." Mikoyan likewise contributed to the development of Soviet meat production (particularly, the so-called Mikoyan cutlet), and a Soviet-era sausage factory in Moscow (notable for producing the mildly spiced, low-fat "doctor's sausage") was named after him.

== The Great Purge ==
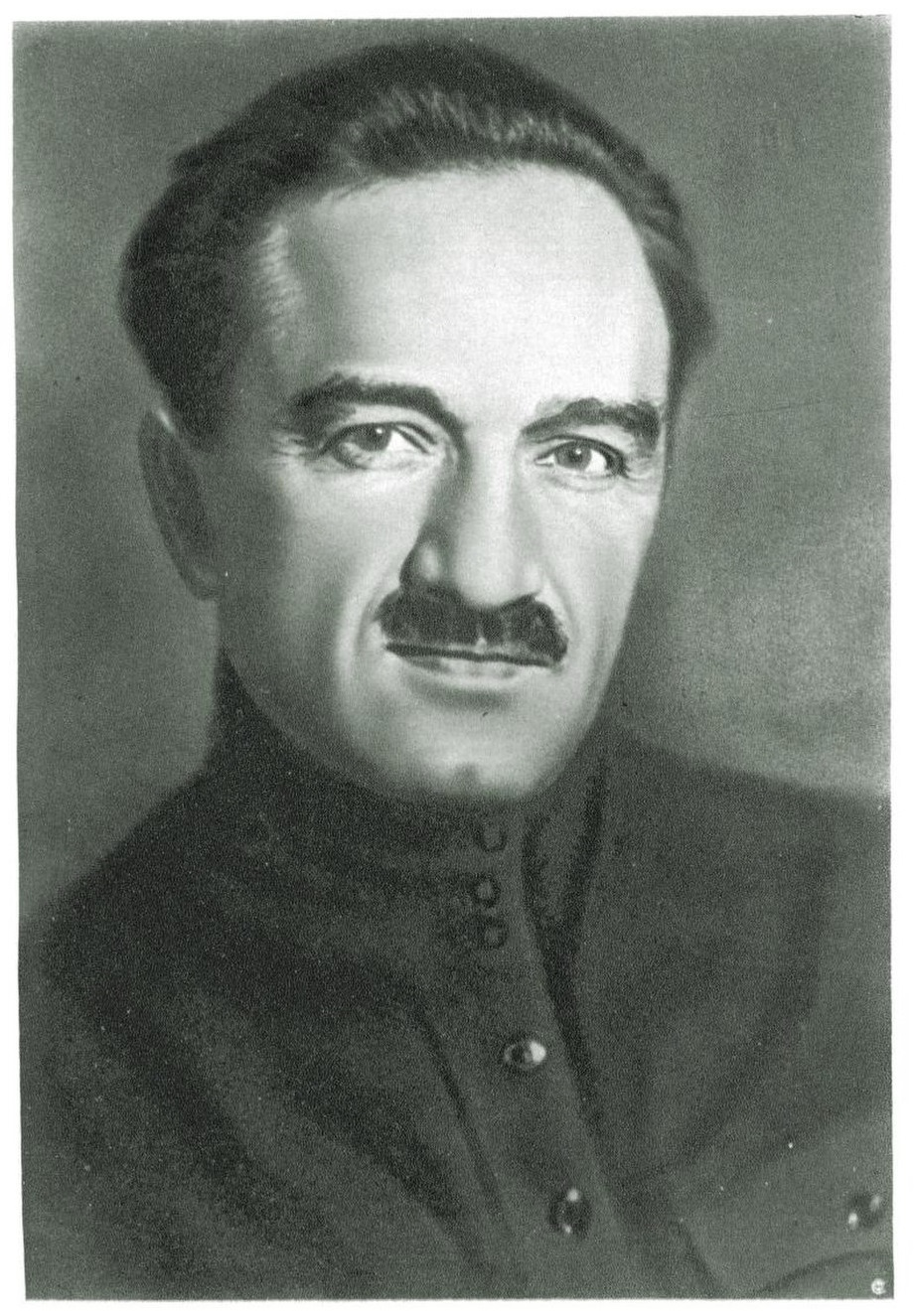
Mikoyan in 1938

In the late 1930s Stalin embarked upon the Great Purge, a series of campaigns of political repression and persecution in the Soviet Union orchestrated against members of the Communist Party, as well as the peasantry and unaffiliated persons. In assessing Mikoyan's role in the purges, historian Simon Sebag-Montefiore stated that he "enjoyed the reputation of one of the more decent leaders: he certainly helped the victims later and worked hard to undo Stalin's rule after the Leader's death." Mikoyan tried to save some close-knit companions from being executed. However, in 1936 he enthusiastically supported the execution of Grigory Zinoviev and Lev Kamenev, claiming it to be a "just verdict". As with other leading officials in 1937, Mikoyan signed death-lists given to him by the NKVD. The purges were often accomplished by officials close to Stalin, giving them the assignment largely as a way to test their loyalty to the regime.

In September 1937, Stalin dispatched Georgy Malenkov and Mikhail Litvin [ru] of the NKVD to Yerevan, the capital of Soviet Armenia, in response to the death of Sahak Ter-Gabrielyan. Their mission was to oversee the purge of the Armenian Communist Party and its leaders First Secretary Amatuni Amatuni and NKVD chief Khachik Mughdusi [hy], both loyalists of Lavrentii Beria. Stalin later dispatched Mikoyan too, in order to test his loyalty and send a signal to Soviet Armenian leaders. Stalin did not trust Mikoyan due to his leniency towards the persecuted. In several instances, Mikoyan had intervened to save friends and colleagues, including Ivan Bagramyan, Avetik Isahakyan, and Yervand Kochar. During his trip to Armenia, he tried, but failed, to save one individual (Danush Shahverdyan) from the repressions. However, "on the instructions of Great Stalin", he led the attack during a stormy session of the Armenian Central Committee plenum, during which Amatuni angrily called him a "liar". More than a thousand people were arrested and seven of nine members of the Armenian Politburo were sacked from office.

== World War II ==
In September 1939, under the Molotov–Ribbentrop Pact, Nazi Germany and the Soviet Union each carved out their own spheres of influence in Poland and Eastern Europe. The Soviets arrested 26,000 Polish officers in the eastern portion of Poland and in March 1940, after some deliberation, Stalin and five other members of the Politburo, Mikoyan included, signed an order for their execution as "nationalists and counterrevolutionaries".

When Germany invaded the Soviet Union in June 1941, Mikoyan was placed in charge of organizing the transportation of food and supplies. His son Vladimir, a pilot in the Red Air Force, died in combat when his plane was shot down over Stalingrad. Mikoyan's main assignment throughout the war was supplying the Red Army with materiel, food and other necessities. He is also credited for his significant role in the 1941 relocation of Soviet industry from the threatened western cities, such as Moscow and Leningrad, eastward to the Urals, Western Siberia, the Volga region, and other safer zones. During the war, Mikoyan alone dissented on Stalin and Beria's deportations of nationalities, especially the Chechens and the Ingush, officially out of "concern regarding the possible international repercussions" for the USSR.

In February 1942, by order of Stalin, Mikoyan became a Special Representative of the State Defense Committee. He had not been a member until that point because Beria believed he would be of more use in government administration. Mikoyan was decorated with a Hero of Socialist Labor in 1943 for his efforts. In 1946, he became the Vice-Premier of the Council of Ministers. As Minister of Foreign Trade, he was responsible for the dismantlement of industry and infrastructure in Soviet-occupied Eastern Germany for collection as reparations.

== Thaw and de-Stalinization ==
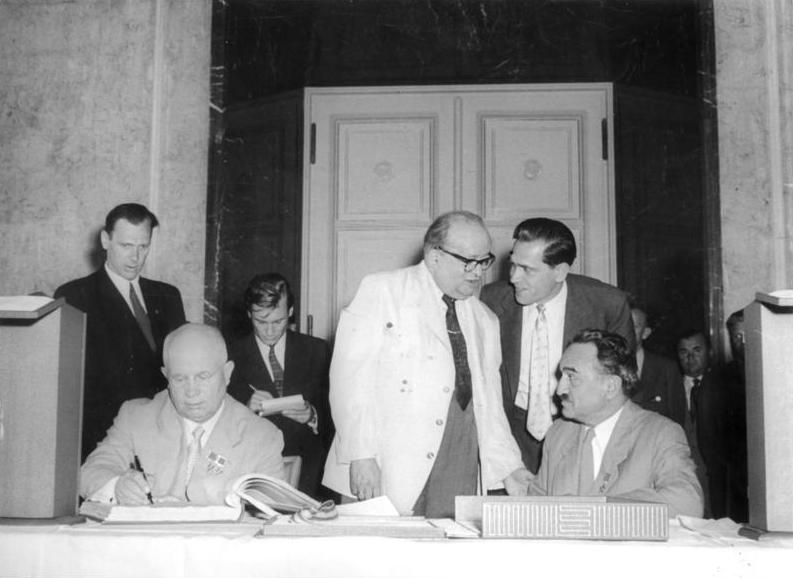
Mikoyan (seated, right) with Nikita Khrushchev (seated, left) in East Berlin, 1957

After the war, Stalin considered launching a new purge against Mikoyan, Vyacheslav Molotov, and several other Party leaders. Consequently, Mikoyan gradually began to fall out of favor and was harshly attacked by Stalin at the Central Committee plenum after 19th Party Congress in October 1952. Stalin's plans never came to fruition, however, as he died before he could put them into motion. After Stalin's death in 1953, a power struggle ensued for the Soviet leadership. Given Mikoyan's Caucasian origins, Nikita Khrushchev was uncertain about his reaction to the idea of removing Stalin's right-hand man, Beria. Mikoyan was therefore the last person who he informed about the anti-Beria plot. However, Mikoyan ultimately approved of Beria's arrest and strongly supported Khrushchev in the post-Stalin power struggle.

In 1956, Mikoyan helped Khrushchev organize his "Secret Speech", delivered before the 20th Party Congress, in which Khrushchev denounced Stalin's personality cult. It was Mikoyan, and not Khrushchev, who made the first anti-Stalinist speech at the 20th Congress. As Khrushchev's "point man on nationality matters", Mikoyan helped roll back some of the stifling restrictions on national cultures imposed during Stalin's time. On 11 March 1954, he gave a speech in Yerevan in his native Armenia, where he called for the rehabilitation of Yeghishe Charents, the republication of Raphael Patkanian and Raffi, and the revival of Alexander Miasnikian's legacy. Behind the scenes, he assisted Armenian leaders in the rehabilitation of former "enemies" in the republic, and worked with Lev Shaumyan (son of Stepan), as well as Gulag returnees Alexei Snegov and Olga Shatunovskaya on the process of de-Stalinization. Mikoyan was personally involved in the rehabilitation of several high-profile Soviet figures, including Armenia's former first secretary, Aghasi Khanjian.

In 1957, Mikoyan refused to back an attempt by Malenkov, Molotov, and Kaganovich to remove Khrushchev from power, and thus secured his position as one of Khrushchev's closest allies during the Thaw. He backed Khrushchev because of his strong support for de-Stalinization and political reform. In recognition of Mikoyan's support and talents, Khrushchev frequently deferred to him on domestic policy. It was Mikoyan who played a leading role in the return and rehabilitation of the various nationalities victimized by the wartime deportations of Stalin and Beria, especially the Chechens and Ingush.

In 1962, Khrushchev sent Mikoyan and Frol Kozlov to Novocherkassk to deal with growing unrest in the southern city. Although Mikoyan opposed force and sought dialogue with the demonstrators, Kozlov pushed for a harsh response, resulting in the Novocherkassk massacre.

== Foreign diplomacy ==
=== China ===
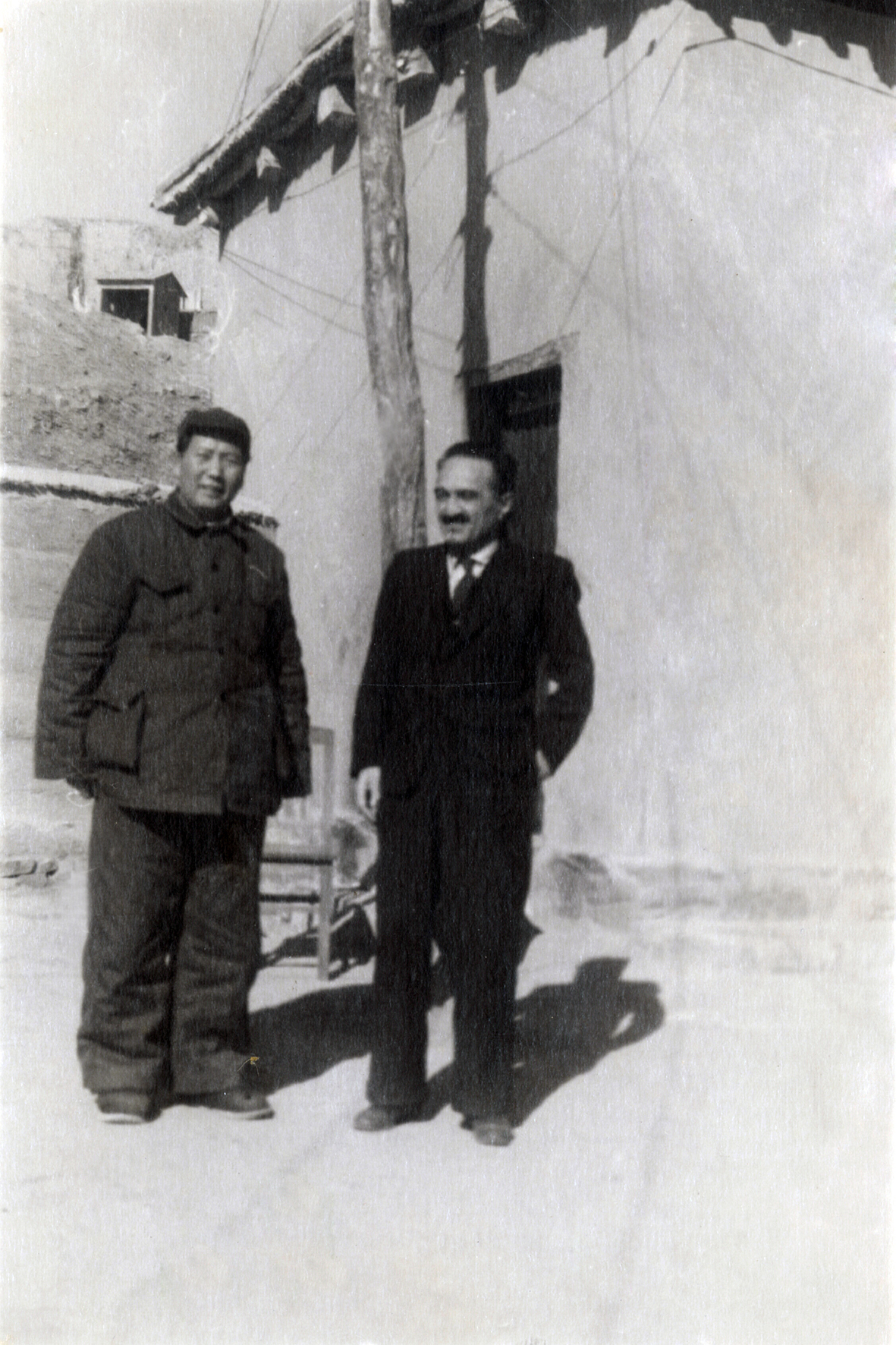
Mikoyan and Mao Zedong in Xibaipo, Hebei, China, February 1949

Mikoyan was the first Politburo member to make direct contact with the Chinese Communist Party Chairman, Mao Zedong. He arrived at Mao's headquarters at Xibaipo on 30 January 1949, one day before the Nationalist government of Chiang Kai-shek was forced to abandon Nanjing, which was then China's capital, and move to Guangzhou. It was there that Mikoyan held a "series of multihour negotiations" with Mao on behalf of Stalin. The secret mission laid the groundwork for Sino-Soviet relations following the communist victory in the Chinese Civil War.

=== Czechoslovakia ===
On 11 November 1951, Stalin sent Mikoyan to Prague to deliver a message to President Klement Gottwald demanding that Rudolf Slánský, former Secretary-General of the Communist Party of Czechoslovakia, be arrested. When Gottwald demurred, Mikoyan broke off the interview to phone Stalin from the Soviet Embassy. When the interview resumed, Mikoyan informed Gottwald that Stalin insisted on Slánský's arrest, after which Gottwald capitulated, paving the way for the Slánský Trial.

=== Hungary ===
In July 1956, Mikoyan visited the People's Republic of Hungary to oversee the removal of the dictator Mátyás Rákosi. He returned in October to gather information on the developing crisis caused by the revolution against the Hungarian Working People's Party government there. Together with Mikhail Suslov, Mikoyan traveled to Budapest in an armored personnel carrier, in view of the shooting in the streets. He sent a telegram to Moscow reporting his impressions of the situation. "We had the impression that Ernő Gerő especially, but the other comrades as well, are exaggerating the strength of the opponent and underestimating their own strength," he and Suslov wrote. Mikoyan strongly opposed the decision by Khrushchev and the Politburo to use Soviet troops, believing it would destroy the Soviet Union's international reputation, instead arguing for the application of "military intimidation" and economic pressure. The crushing of the revolution by Soviet forces nearly led to Mikoyan's resignation.

=== United States ===
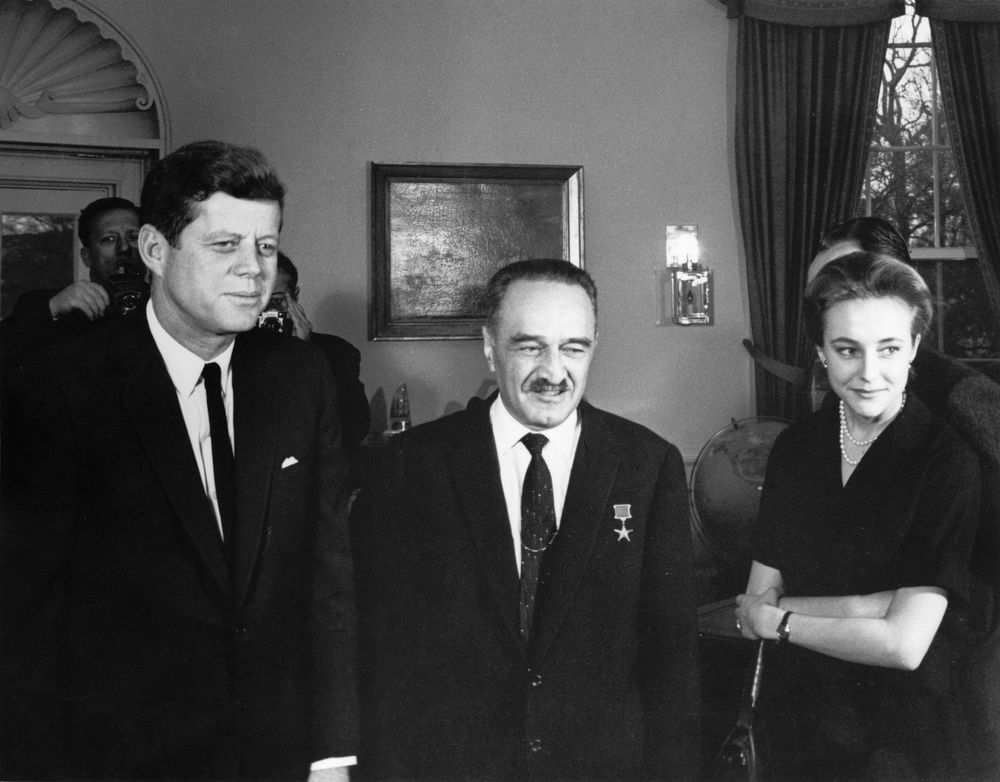
Mikoyan with John F. Kennedy and State Department interpreter Natalie Kushnir at the Oval Office, 1962.

Khrushchev's liberalization of Soviet policies led to an improvement in relations between the U.S. and the USSR during the late 1950s. As Khrushchev's primary emissary, Mikoyan visited the U.S. several times. Despite the volatility of the Cold War between the two superpowers, many Americans received Mikoyan amiably, including Minnesota Democrat Hubert Humphrey, who characterized him as someone who showed a "flexibility of attitude" and New York governor Averell Harriman, who described him as a "less rigid" Soviet politician.

During November 1958 Khrushchev made an unsuccessful attempt to turn all of Berlin into an independent, demilitarized "free city", giving the U.S., Great Britain, and France a six-month ultimatum to withdraw their troops from the sectors they still occupied in West Berlin, or he would transfer control of Western access rights to the East Germans. Mikoyan disapproved of Khrushchev's actions, claiming they violated "Party principle". Khrushchev had proposed the ultimatum to the West before discussing it with the Central Committee. Ruud van Dijk, a historian, believed Mikoyan was angry because Khrushchev did not consult him about the proposal. When asked by Khrushchev to ease tension with the U.S., Mikoyan responded, "You started it, so you go!"

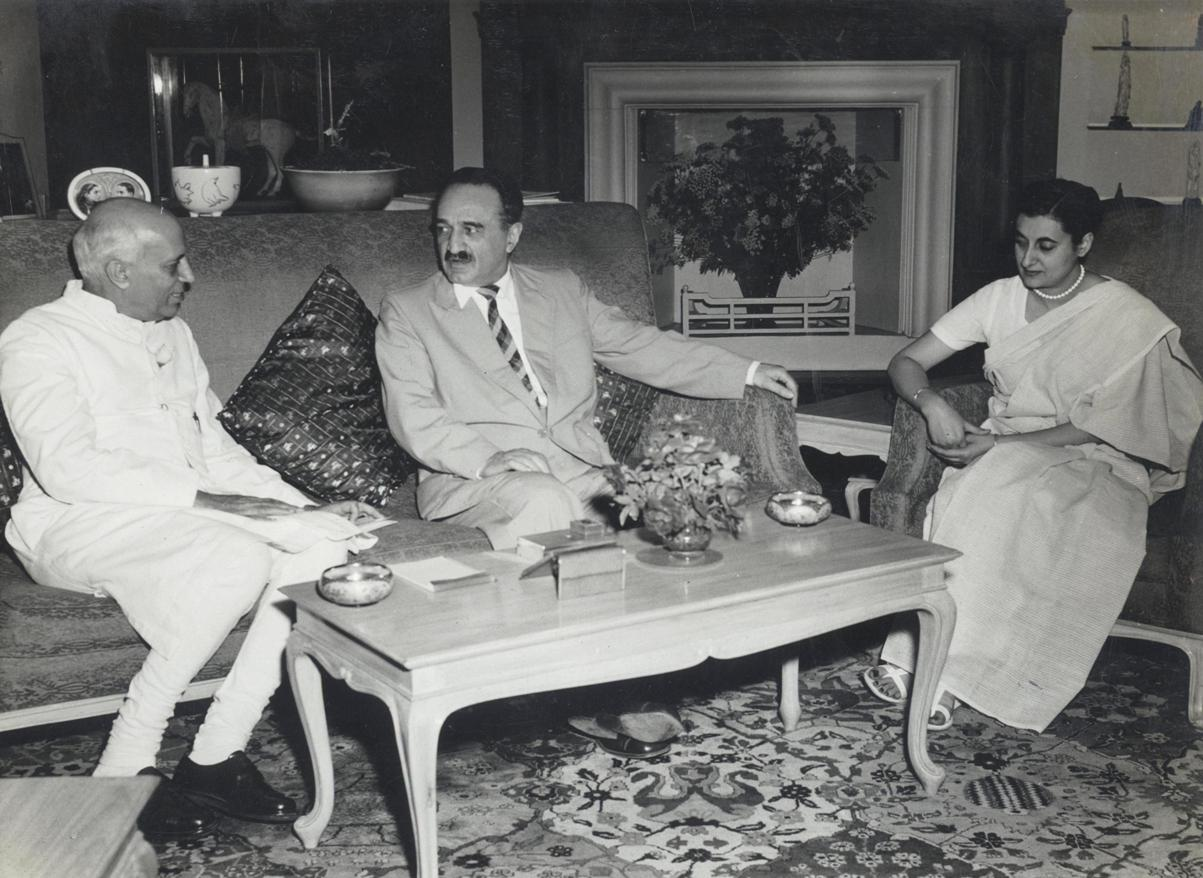
Mikoyan with Jawaharlal Nehru and Indira Gandhi in Moscow, 1956

However, Mikoyan eventually left for Washington, D.C., which was the first time a senior governing member of the USSR's Council of Ministers visited the U.S. on a diplomatic mission to its leadership. Furthermore, Mikoyan approached the mission with unprecedented informality, beginning with phrasing his visa request to U.S. Embassy as "a fortnight's holiday" to visit his friend, Mikhail Menshikov, the then Soviet Ambassador to the U.S. While the White House was taken off guard by this seemingly impromptu diplomatic mission, Mikoyan was invited to speak to numerous elite American organizations such as the Council on Foreign Relations and the Detroit Club in which he professed his hopes for the USSR to have a more peaceful relationship with the U.S. While in Cleveland, Mikoyan gifted a troika to industrialist Cyrus Eaton and admired the city's Terminal Tower, which reminded him of the tower at Moscow State University.

In addition to such well received engagements, Mikoyan indulged in more informal opportunities to meet the public such as having breakfast at a Howard Johnson's restaurant on the New Jersey Turnpike, visiting Macy's Department Store in New York City and meeting celebrities in Hollywood like Jerry Lewis and Sophia Loren before having an audience with President Dwight Eisenhower and Secretary of State John Foster Dulles. Although unsuccessful in altering Washington's Berlin policy, Mikoyan was hailed in the U.S. for easing international tensions with an innovative emphasis on soft diplomacy that was received well by the American public.

Mikoyan disapproved of Khrushchev's walkout from the 1960 Paris Summit over the U-2 Crisis of 1960, which he believed kept tension in the Cold War high for another fifteen years. However, throughout this time, he remained Khrushchev's closest ally in the upper echelons of the Soviet leadership. As Mikoyan later noted, Khrushchev "engaged [in] inexcusable hysterics".

In November 1963, Mikoyan was asked by Khrushchev to represent the USSR at President John F. Kennedy's funeral. At the funeral ceremony, Mikoyan appeared visibly shaken by the president's death and was approached by Jacqueline Kennedy, who took his hand and conveyed to him the following message: "Please tell Mr. Chairman [Khrushchev] that I know he and my husband worked together for a peaceful world, and now he and you must carry on my husband's work." He met with President Lyndon B. Johnson to discuss post-Kennedy U.S.-Soviet relations. There were rumours that Oswald had been an agent of the KGB, which greatly concerned the Soviet government. From Washington, Mikoyan wrote back to Moscow that "the U.S. government does not want to involve us in this matter, it clearly prefers to consign the whole business to oblivion as soon as possible".

=== Cuba and the Missile Crisis ===
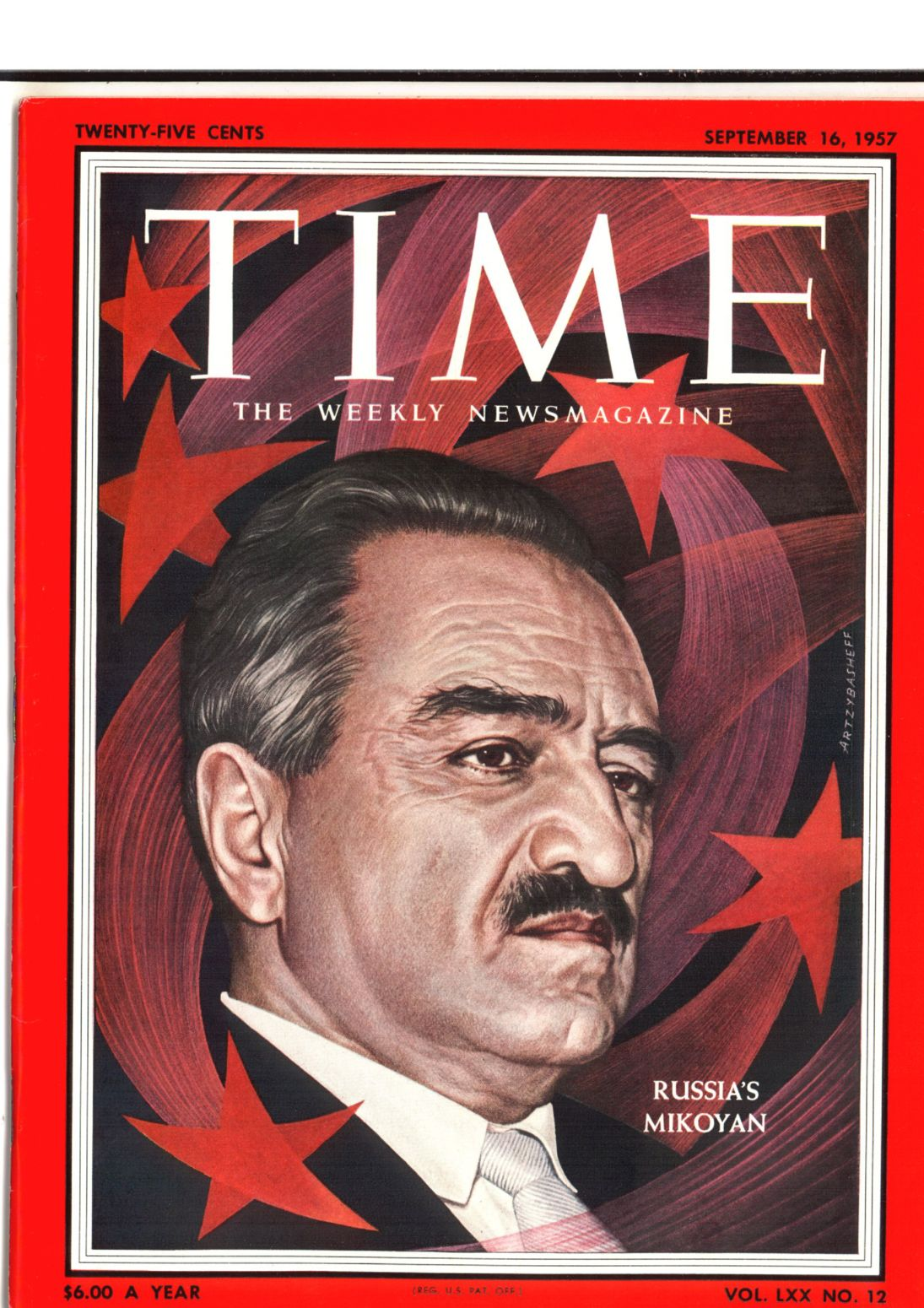
Mikoyan on the cover of Time Magazine in 1957

The Soviet government welcomed the overthrow of Cuban President Fulgencio Batista by Fidel Castro's pro-socialist rebels in the Cuban Revolution of 1959. Khrushchev realized the potential of a Soviet ally in the Caribbean and dispatched Mikoyan as one of the top diplomats in Latin America. He was the first Soviet official to visit Cuba after the revolution, except for Soviet intelligence officers. He secured important trade agreements with the new government. However, he admitted that it could be difficult to negotiate with Che Guevara, joking that Guevara "lived up to the name 'Che', because 'che' means 'no' in Armenian". Mikoyan left Cuba with very positive impressions; the atmosphere there evoked memories of his "revolutionary youth" in the Caucasus.

Khrushchev told Mikoyan of his idea of shipping Soviet missiles to Cuba. Mikoyan was opposed to the idea, and was even more opposed to giving the Cubans control over the Soviet missiles. In early November 1962, after the U.S. and the Soviet Union agreed to a framework to remove Soviet nuclear missiles from Cuba, Khrushchev dispatched Mikoyan to Havana to help persuade Castro to cooperate in the withdrawal. Just prior to beginning negotiations with Castro, Mikoyan was informed about the death of his wife, Ashkhen, in Moscow; rather than return there for the funeral, Mikoyan opted to stay and sent his son Sergo there instead.

Castro was adamant that the missiles remain but Mikoyan, seeking to avoid a full-fledged confrontation with Washington, attempted to convince him otherwise. He told Castro, "You know that not only in these letters but today also, we hold to the position that you will keep all the weapons and all the military specialists with the exception of the 'offensive' weapons and associated service personnel, which were promised to be withdrawn in Khrushchev's letter [of October 27]." Castro balked at the idea of further concessions, namely the removal of the Il-28 bombers and tactical nuclear weapons still left in Cuba. Eventually, after several tense and grueling weeks of negotiations, he finally relented, and the missiles and the bombers were removed in December of that year.

== Head of state and retirement ==
In July 1964, Khrushchev appointed Mikoyan as Chairman of the Presidium of the Supreme Soviet, replacing Leonid Brezhnev. Although Mikoyan's new position was largely ceremonial, his appointment was well received in his native Armenia, with Anton Kochinyan declaring that "for the first time in our centuries-old history, an Armenian had risen to the Russian throne! Indeed, he made every Armenian proud."

Some scholars have claimed that, by 1964, Mikoyan believed that Khrushchev had turned into a liability to the Party, and that he was involved in the October 1964 coup that brought Brezhnev and Alexei Kosygin to power. However, historian William Taubman disputes this, as Mikoyan was the only member of the Presidium (the name for the Politburo at this time) to defend Khrushchev. Mikoyan, however, did vote to force Khrushchev's retirement (so as, in traditional Soviet style, to make the vote unanimous). Alone among Khrushchev's colleagues, Mikoyan wished the former leader well in his retirement, and he, alone, visited Khrushchev at his dacha a few years later. Mikoyan laid a wreath and sent a letter of condolence at Khrushchev's funeral in 1971.

Due to his partial defense of Khrushchev during his ouster, Mikoyan lost his high standing with the new Soviet leadership. The Politburo forced Mikoyan to retire from his seat in the Politburo due to old age. Mikoyan also resigned from his post as head of state and was succeeded by Nikolai Podgorny on 9 December 1965. In retirement, Mikoyan, like Khrushchev, wrote frank but selective memoirs from his political career, including his revolutionary activity in Baku. Mikoyan died on 21 October 1978, at the age of 82, from natural causes and was buried at Novodevichy Cemetery in Moscow. At his funeral, the Soviet Armenian government "provided an official guard of honor." He received six commendations of the Order of Lenin.

== Personal life and family ==
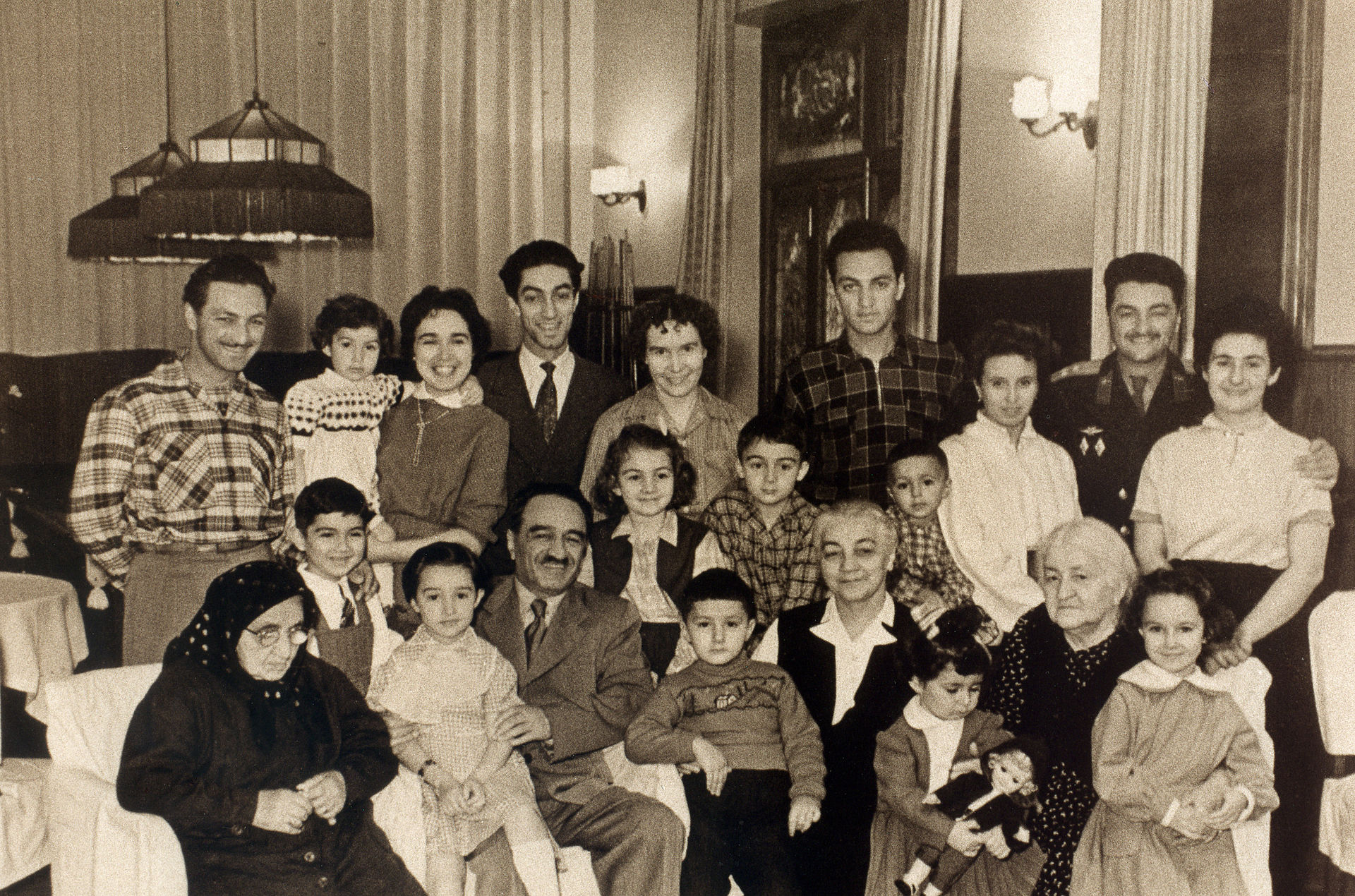
Mikoyan (seated) and his family c. 1950s

Mikoyan married Ashkhen Tumanyan in 1921. Together, they had five sons – Stepan, Vladimir, Aleksei, Vano, and Sergo. Kochinyan recalled that, while visiting the Armenian village of Khndzoresk in the 1960s, Mikoyan was asked by a local woman how many children his wife had. When he replied "five boys", she "laughed heartily" and remarked "Your wife is a rashid [hero]. There is no way that I can top her!" In addition to their five sons, the Mikoyans adopted the sons of Stepan Shaumian. They had so many children under their care that they faced financial problems. Ashkhen would borrow money from Politburo wives who had fewer children. If Mikoyan had discovered this, he would, according to his children, have become furious.

In addition to Armenian and Russian, Mikoyan understood English and learned German by translating Karl Marx's Das Kapital into Russian. He was close to his brother Artem, and counted Marshal of the Soviet Union Ivan Bagramyan among his personal friends. He was also a friend and supporter of the artist Yervand Kochar, and the composer Aram Khachaturian. Despite his break with the Armenian Church, Mikoyan maintained good relations with Catholicos Vazgen I.

== Legacy ==
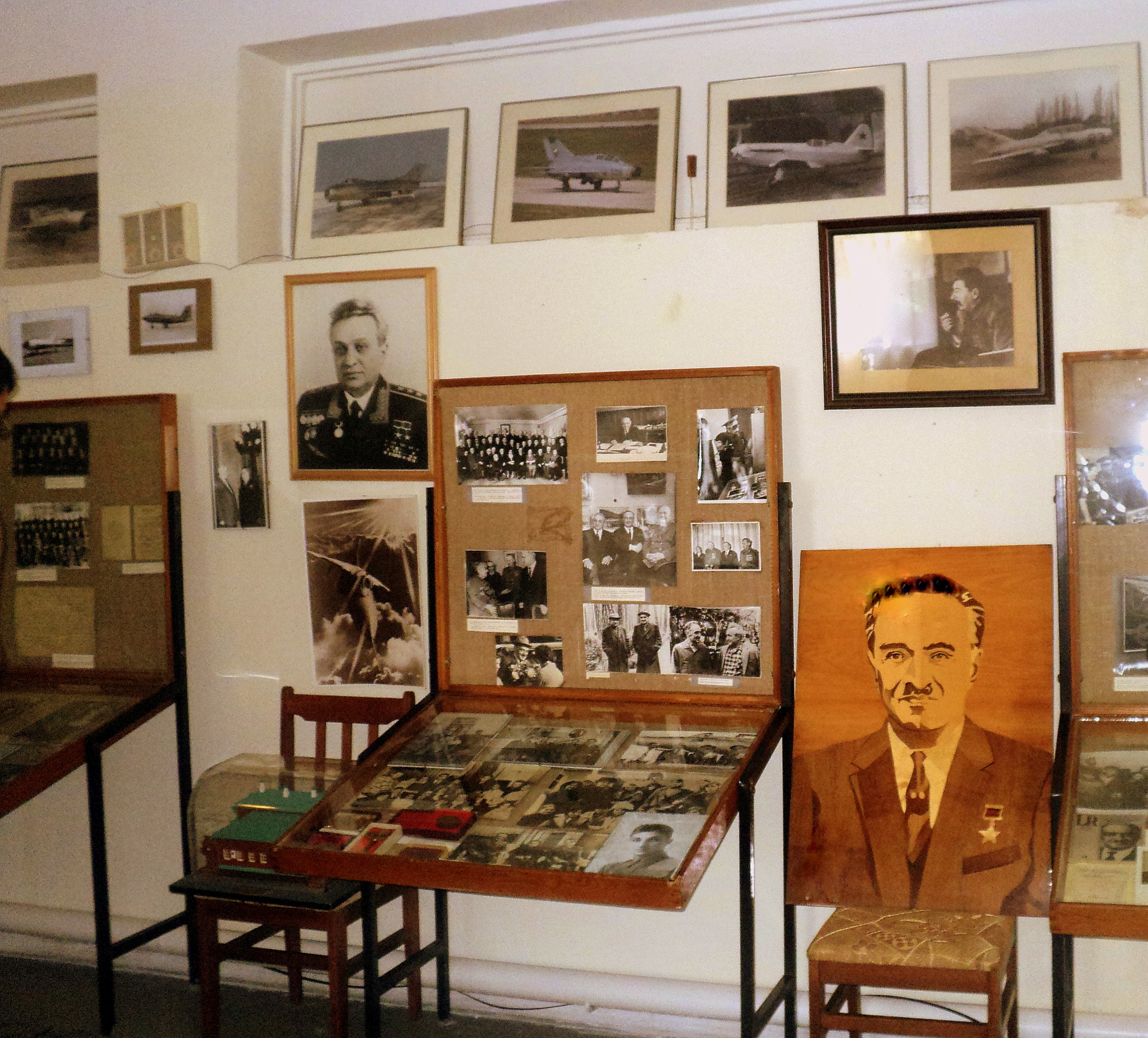
The Mikoyan Brothers Museum in Sanahin, Alaverdi, Armenia

Stephen F. Cohen described Mikoyan as a "heavily mustached, and reportedly sympathetic Armenian", while Harrison Salisbury characterized him as a "spirited and gifted member of Lenin's party" and a "dedicated organizer". Simon Sebag-Montefiore referred to Mikoyan as "slim, circumspect, wily and industrious" as well as "highly intelligent with the driest of wits". Mikhail Gorbachev assessed Mikoyan as an "extraordinarily complex and colorful political figure". Khrushchev once called Mikoyan a true cavalier, but also warned of trusting "that shrewd fox from the east". In a close conversation with Vyacheslav Molotov and Nikolai Bukharin, Stalin once referred to Mikoyan as a "duckling in politics"; he noted, however, that if Mikoyan ever took a serious shot he would improve.

Mikoyan was deeply proud of his Armenian background and viewed Soviet Russia as the best guarantor for Armenia's survival, given the legacy of the Armenian genocide. In a 1959 meeting with U.S. Vice President Richard Nixon in Moscow, he raised the issue of the treatment of the Armenians in Turkey. He greatly enjoyed meeting fellow Armenians abroad, including former U.S. ambassador Edward Djerejian. In 1962, K. P. S. Menon described Mikoyan as Armenia's "most famous son". David Marshall Lang cited him as an "excellent modern example" of Armenian "toughness and endurance", while Khrushchev cited Mikoyan and his brother Artem as examples of Armenian success in the USSR.

However, in post-Soviet Armenia, Mikoyan's legacy is paradoxical. His supporters argue that he was a major figure on the global political stage and point to his diplomacy during the Cuban missile crisis. His critics point to his participation in the 1930s purges in Armenia on the orders of Stalin. Others emphasize Mikoyan's important role in de-Stalinization in Armenia, including his significant involvement in rehabilitations. Mikoyan's contributions to the Soviet Armenian state included support for major economic projects, such as the Arpa–Sevan tunnel. As a Supreme Soviet Deputy for Yerevan, he maintained close ties with Soviet Armenian officials like Anton Kochinyan, Yeghishe Astsatryan, and Yakov Zarobyan and regularly advised them on Armenian affairs. Both Kochinyan and Astsatryan devoted chapters of their memoirs to Mikoyan and his activities on behalf of Armenia. Although limited in his ability to assist Armenian leaders on Nagorno-Karabakh, Mikoyan was sympathetic to Armenian concerns, and his son Sergo later became a prominent advocate for the Karabakh movement.

Mikoyan was one of the few Old Bolsheviks who survived Stalin's purges and was able to retire comfortably from political life. Sheila Fitzpatrick referred to Mikoyan as "the great survivor of Soviet politics", while Roy Medvedev wrote that Mikoyan represented an "uncommon example of political survival under Soviet conditions". Pietro Shakarian noted that Mikoyan's reputation for survival was "undoubtedly augmented by the larger theme of survival in the history of his native republic, Armenia". One veteran Soviet official described Mikoyan's political career in the following manner: "The rascal was able to walk through Red Square on a rainy day without an umbrella [and] without getting wet. He could dodge the raindrops." The Mikoyan Brothers Museum, honoring Mikoyan and his brother Artem, was opened in Sanahin in 1982. In addition, a street in Yerevan is named after Mikoyan. From 1935 to 1957, the Armenian town of Yeghegnadzor was known as Mikoyan, in honor of the statesman.

== Awards ==
- Hero of Socialist Labour
- Order of Lenin, six times
- Order of the October Revolution
- Order of the Red Banner

== See also ==
- Outline of the Russian Revolution and Civil War
- Bibliography of the Russian Revolution and Civil War
- Bibliography of Stalinism and the Soviet Union
- Bibliography of the post-Stalinist Soviet Union
- Index of Old Bolsheviks
- Index of articles related to the Russian Revolution and Civil War

== Bibliography ==
- Astsatryan, Yeghishe T. (2004). XX դար. Հայաստանի կառուցման ճանապարհին (in Armenian). Yerevan: Edit Print. ISBN 99941-36-61-5.
- Baron, Samuel H. (2001). Bloody Saturday in the Soviet Union: Novocherkassk, 1962. Stanford, CA: Stanford University Press. ISBN 9780804740937.
- Brown, Archie (2009). The Rise and Fall of Communism. New York: Ecco. ISBN 978-0-06-113879-9.
- Cohen, Stephen F. (2011). The Victims Return: Survivors of the Gulag After Stalin. London: I.B. Tauris. ISBN 9781848858480.
- Conquest, Robert (1971). The Great Terror. Harmondsworth, Middlesex: Penguin. ISBN 9780195055801.
- Deutscher, Isaac (1989). The Prophet Unarmed, Trotsky 1921-1929. Oxford: Oxford University Press. ISBN 0-19-281065-0.
- Douglass, James W. (2008). JFK and the Unspeakable. New York: Simon and Schuster. ISBN 978-1-4391-9388-4.
- Dumbrell, John (2004). President Lyndon Johnson and Soviet Communism. Manchester: Manchester University Press. ISBN 978-0719062643.
- Fitzpatrick, Sheila (2015). On Stalin's Team: The Years of Living Dangerously in Soviet Politics. Princeton: Princeton University Press. ISBN 978-0691145334.
- Gati, Charles (2003). "Foreword". In Békés, Csaba; Byrne, Malcolm; Ranier, János M. (eds.). The 1956 Hungarian Revolution: A History in Documents. Budapest: Central European University Press. ISBN 978-963-9241-66-4.
- Glushchenko, Irina V. (2010). Общепит. Микоян и советская кухня (in Russian). Moscow: Издательский дом ВШЭ. ISBN 978-5-7598-0725-4.
- Hambardzumyan, Viktor, ed. (1981). "Միկոյան, Անաստաս Հովհաննեսի". Soviet Armenian Encyclopedia (in Armenian). Vol. 7. Yerevan: Armenian Academy of Sciences.
- Hornsby, Robert (2023). The Soviet Sixties. New Haven: Yale University Press. ISBN 978-0300250527.
- Hovannisian, Richard G. (1971). The Republic of Armenia. Vol. 1: The First Year, 1918–1919. Berkeley: University of California Press. ISBN 978-0520019843.
- Kaplan, Fred (2009). 1959: The Year Everything Changed. Hoboken, NJ: J. Wiley & Sons. ISBN 978-0-470-38781-8.
- Keegan, John (2005). The Second World War. New York: Penguin Books. ISBN 978-0143035732.
- Khrushchev, Nikita S. (2006). Memoirs of Nikita Khrushchev: Reformer, 1945–1964. Vol. 2. University Park, PA: Penn State University Press. ISBN 978-0-271-02332-8.
- Khrushchev, Sergei N. (2008). Nikita Khrushchev and the Creation of a Superpower. University Park, PA: Penn State University Press. ISBN 978-0-271-02170-6.
- Kochinyan, Anton (2008). Անավարտ հուշեր (in Armenian). Yerevan: Հեղինակային հրատարակություն. ISBN 978-9939532189.
- Kotkin, Stephen (2014). Stalin: Volume I: Paradoxes of Power, 1878-1928. New York: Penguin Press. ISBN 978-1594203794.
- Lang, David Marshall (1970). Armenia: Cradle of Civilization. London: Allen & Unwin.
- Loginov, Vladlen T. [in Russian], ed. (1996). А.И. Микоян: К 100-летию со дня рождения (in Russian). Moscow: Апрель-85, The Gorbachev Foundation.
- Malkasian, Mark (1996). Gha-ra-bagh!: The Emergence of the National Democratic Movement in Armenia. Detroit: Wayne State University Press. ISBN 0-8143-2605-6.
- Marshall, Alex (2010). The Caucasus Under Soviet Rule. London: Routledge. ISBN 9780415410120.
- Matossian, Mary Kilbourne (1962). The Impact of Soviet Policies in Armenia. Leiden: E.J. Brill.
- Medvedev, Roy A. (1984). All Stalin's Men. Translated by Harold Shukman. Garden City, NY: Doubleday. ISBN 9780385190626.
- Menon, K. P. S. (1962). Russian Panorama. London: Oxford University Press.
- Mikoyan, Sergo A. (2012). Svetlana Savranskaya (ed.). The Soviet Cuban Missile Crisis: Castro, Mikoyan, Kennedy, Khrushchev, and the Missiles of November. Washington, D.C.: Woodrow Wilson Center Press. ISBN 9780804762014.
- Mikoyan, Stepan A. (1999). Stepan Anastasovich Mikoyan: An Autobiography. Translated by Aschen Mikoyan. Shrewsbury: Airlife Publishing. ISBN 1-85310-916-9.
- Newman, Kitty (2007). Macmillan, Khrushchev and the Berlin Crisis, 1958–1960. New York: Taylor & Francis. ISBN 978-0-415-35463-9.
- Pavlov, Mikhail (2014). Анастас Микоян. Политический портрет на фоне советской эпохи (in Russian). Moscow: Международные отношения. ISBN 9785713313647.
- Pelikán, Jiří, ed. (1971). The Czechoslovak Political Trials, 1950-1954: The Suppressed Report of the Dubcek Government's Commission of Inquiry, 1968. Stanford, CA: Stanford University Press. ISBN 9780804707695.
- Salisbury, Harrison (1988). Preface. The Memoirs of Anastas Mikoyan, Vol. 1: The Path of Struggle. By Anastas Mikoyan. Translated by Katherine T. O'Connor; Diana L. Burgin. Madison, CT: Sphinx Press. pp. xii–xiii. ISBN 0-943071-04-6.
- Schattenberg, Susanne (2021). Brezhnev: The Making of a Statesman. London: I. B. Tauris. ISBN 978-1838606381.
- Sebag Montefiore, Simon (2005). Stalin: The Court of the Red Tsar. New York: Vintage Books. ISBN 978-1-4000-7678-9.
- Shakarian, Pietro A. (2025). Anastas Mikoyan: An Armenian Reformer in Khrushchev's Kremlin. Bloomington: Indiana University Press. ISBN 978-0253073556.
- Smith, Kathleen E. (2017). Moscow 1956: The Silenced Spring. Cambridge, MA: Harvard University Press. ISBN 9780674972001.
- Suny, Ronald Grigor (1972). The Baku Commune, 1917-1918: Class and Nationality in the Russian Revolution. Princeton: Princeton University Press. ISBN 978-0691051932.
- Taubman, William C. (2004). Khrushchev: The Man and His Era. New York: W. W. Norton & Company. ISBN 978-0-393-32484-6.
- Tucker, Robert C. (1992). Stalin in Power: The Revolution from Above, 1928–1941. New York: W. W. Norton & Company. ISBN 978-0-393-30869-3.
- Yuzefovich, Victor A. (1985). Aram Khachaturyan. Translated by Nicholas Kournokoff; Vladimir Bobrov. New York: Sphinx Press. ISBN 0-8236-8658-2.

== Memoirs ==
- Mikoyan, Anastas I. (1970). Мысли и воспоминания о Ленине (in Russian). Moscow: Политиздат.
- Mikoyan, Anastas I. (1971). Дорогой борьбы (in Russian). Moscow: Политиздат.
- Mikoyan, Anastas I. (1975). В начале двадцатых... (in Russian). Moscow: Политиздат.
- Mikoyan, Anastas I. (2014). Так было. Размышления о минувшем (in Russian). Moscow: Центрполиграф. ISBN 9785227051097.

Political offices
Preceded by Leonid Brezhnev	Chairman of the Presidium of the Supreme Soviet; 1964–1965	Succeeded by Nikolai Podgorny
