= Fernand Faure =

French economist and politician

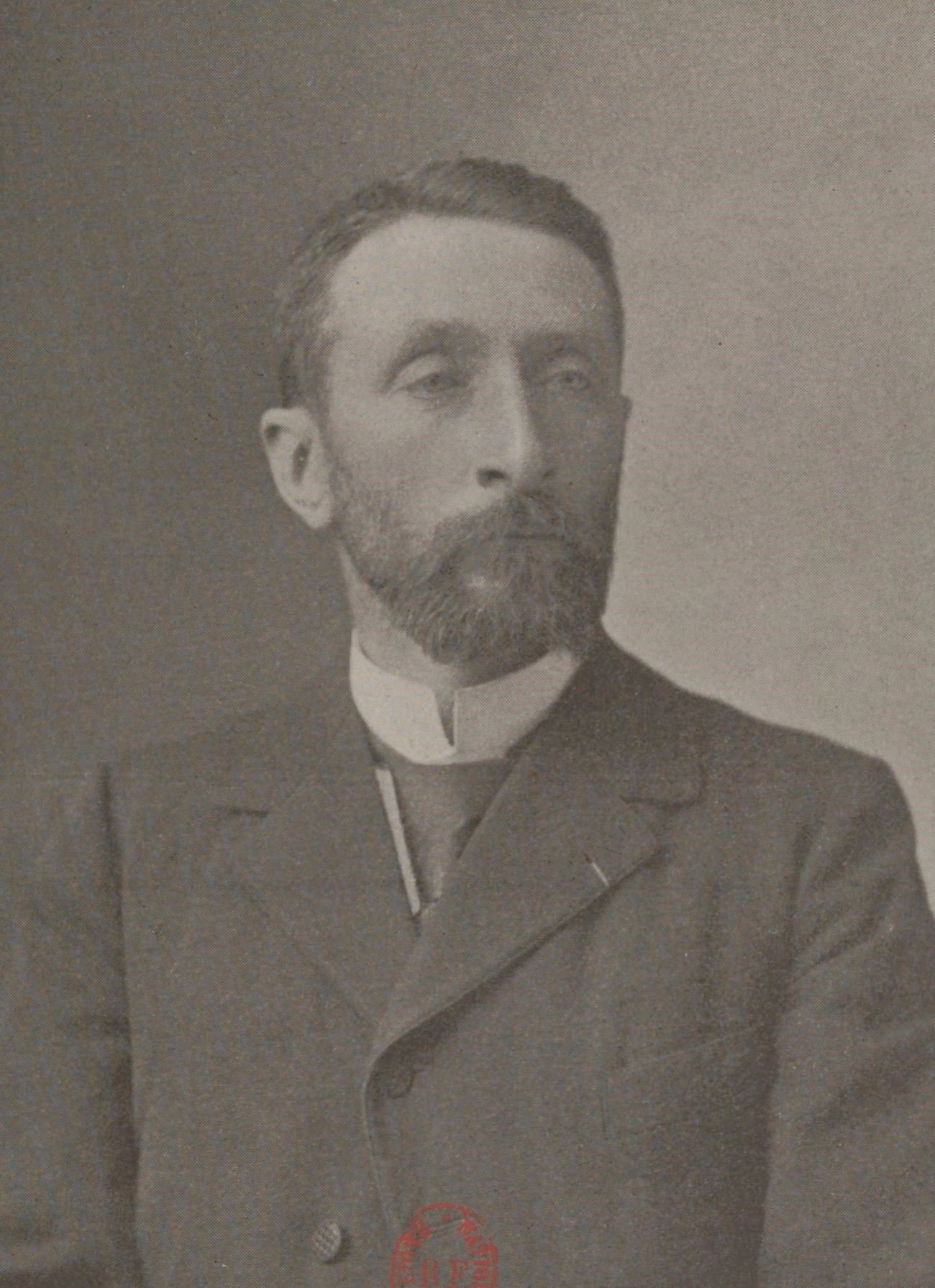

Deputy for Gironde
- In office 18 October 1885 – 11 November 1889

Senator for Gironde
- In office 1 January 1924 – 1 January 1929

Personal details
- Born: 16 March 1853 Ribérac, Dordogne, France
- Died: 6 November 1929 (aged 76) Paris, France
- Occupation: Economist, politician

Fernand Faure (French pronunciation: [fɛʁnɑ̃ fɔʁ]; 16 March 1853 – 6 November 1929) was a French economist and politician. He held office as a deputy from 1885 to 1889, then despite repeated attempts at reelection was out of office until becoming a Senator in 1924. During the interim period he taught and published various books and articles on economics and statistics.

== Early years (1853–1885) ==
Fernand Faure was born on 16 March 1853 at Ribérac, Dordogne. He studied law at Bordeaux and registered in the bar of that city in November 1873. After obtaining a doctorate in law and being agrégé he was put in charge of teaching economics at the Douai Faculty of Law (1877–1880) and then at the Bordeaux Faculty of Law (1880). He was one of the founders and vice-president of the Société d'économie politique of Bordeaux. He was vice-president of the Girondin Committee of the League of Education (1883).

== Deputy (1885–1889) ==
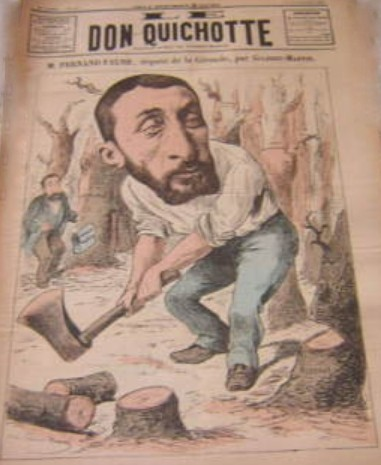
1886 Caricature of Faure by Charles Gilbert-Martin

On 4 October 1885 Fernand Faure was elected Deputy for Gironde. He was deputy for Gironde from 18 October 1885 to 11 November 1889. He sat with the left, and took an active role in parliamentary debates, particularly about the budget. In November 1886, during the discussion of the 1887 budget, he defended the financial policy of the last few years, and made numerous speeches and amendments. On 30 March 1887 he opposed the Minister of Finance Albert Dauphin. He was twice a member of the budget committee, and was also budget rapporteur for the Ministry of Finance. He voted against revision of the constitution, for prosecution of the three deputies who belonged to the Ligue des Patriotes, for the Lisbonne law defining the liberty of the press and for suits against General Georges Ernest Boulanger.

== Professor and journalist (1889–1914) ==
On 6 August 1887, as professor of law at Bordeaux and deputy for Gironde, Faure married Laure Donnat, daughter of a Paris municipal councillor. In 1889 Faure lost his seat to the Boulangist candidate Antoine Jourde, who won the second round of voting. He then returned to teaching at the Bordeaux Faculty of Law. He was appointed Professor of Statistics at the Faculty of Paris three years later. In 1896 he became Director General of Registration at the Ministry of Finance. He reorganized the way in which statistics were managed, and created the Bulletin de l'Enregistrement. He was elected a member of the International Statistical Institute in 1897, and became President of the Statistical Society of Paris in 1899. He left the Ministry of Finance in 1901. He then returned to his chair as Professor of Statistics.

The Revue politique et parlementaire was founded by Marcel Fournier, a professor of law and moderate liberal, with the help of partners such as Pierre Waldeck-Rousseau. The first issue appeared in July 1894. Fournier wanted to discuss questions debated in parliament in more depth, and disseminate the views of specialists to the politicians. Fernand Faure became director of the journal from 1901. He held this position until 1911. In the early 1900s the journal published the competing views of Ferdinand Buisson, Charles Dupuy and René Goblet on the role of the church in education. In 1910 Faure published articles in the journal on counting civil servants in France and the other main European countries.

== Last years (1914–1929) ==
During World War I (1914–1918) Faure headed the secretariat of the Economic Committee. In 1917 Paul Doumer, Minister of State in the government of Paul Painlevé, entrusted him with direction of his office. He had repeatedly run for election to parliament, both in Bordeaux and in Paris, but without success. He finally was elected to the Senate for Gironde in 1924. Fernand Faure was Senator for Gironde from 1 January 1924 to 1 January 1929. He was assigned to committees of finance, education and foreign affairs, and was often the rapporteur. On 6 November 1929 he was found dead at the house of his son-in-law, Professor Abrami.

== Publications ==
Selected publications by Fernand Faure:

- Fernand Faure (1873), De Exercitoria actione. De la responsabilité des propriétaires de navire (thesis), Bordeaux: impr. Duverdier, p. 180
- Fernand Faure (1878), Essai historique sur le préteur romain, Paris: E. Thorin, p. 144
- Fernand Faure (1900), Note sur les charges fiscales des valeurs mobilières en France et dans quelques pays étrangers, Paris: impr. de P. Dupont, Congrès international des valeurs mobilières, p. 32
- Fernand Faure (1903), Rapport sur la contribution que peut apporter la statistique financière à l'étude des phénomènes sociaux, politiques, économiques et juridiques, Berlin: impr. de J. Sittenfeld, Institut international de statistique. IXe session., p. 45
- Fernand Faure (1906), Éléments de statistique, résumé du cours fait à la Faculté de droit de Paris (1904–1905), Paris: L. Larose et L. Tenin, p. 135
- Jacques Bertillon; Fernand Faure (1908), Rapports au Conseil supérieur de statistique. Rapport préliminaire de la Commission de la statistique des fonctionnaires, Paris: Impr. nationale, France. Direction de la statistique générale, p. 80
- Fernand Faure (1909), Les Précurseurs de la Société de statistique de Paris, Nancy: impr. de Berger-Levrault, p. 48
- Auguste Arnauné; Paul Delombre; Fernand Faure (1914), Alfred de Foville (1842–1913), Paris: Impr. de Plon-Nourrit, p. 71

== Sources ==
- Bertrand, Michel (1996), Violences et pouvoirs politiques (in French), Presses Univ. du Mirail, ISBN 978-2-85816-243-7
- Fernand Faure (in French), Assemblée nationale
- Jolly, Jean (1960–1977), "Fernand Faure", Dictionnaire des parlementaires français de 1889 à 1940 (in French)
- Malaval, J (August 1887), "Mariage de M. Fernand Faure", Le Conseiller des Contribuables et des Consommateurs (in French), Paris
- March, Lucien (1930), "Nécrologie : Fernand Faure (1853-1929)" (PDF), Journal de la société statistique de Paris, 71
- Notre histoire (in French), Revue politique et parlementaire
- Revue politique et parlementaire (Paris) (in French), BnF: Bibliotheque nationale de France
- Robert, Adolphe; Cougny, Gaston (1889), "Fernand Faure", Dictionnaire des parlementaires français de 1789 à 1889 (in French)
- Ruiz, Émilien (April–June 2010), "Compter : l'invention de la statistique des fonctionnaires en France (1890–1930) / Counting: The invention of civil servant statistics in France (1890–1930)", Sociologie du Travail (in French), 52 (2), Elsevier Masson SAS: 212–233, doi:10.4000/sdt.13791, JSTOR 41931526
