= Revue Politique et Parlementaire =

French magazine

- Editor: Arnaud Benedetti
- Categories: Politics
- Frequency: Quarterly
- Publisher: Vincent Dupy
- Founder: Marcel Fournier
- First issue: July 1894; 132 years ago
- Country: France
- Based in: Paris
- Language: French
- Website: www.revuepolitique.fr
- ISSN: 0035-385X
- OCLC: 7550481

The Revue Politique et Parlementaire (French pronunciation: [ʁəvy pɔlitik e paʁləmɑ̃tɛʁ]) is a quarterly French magazine that discusses political issues, established in 1894 by Marcel Fournier.

== History ==
The magazine was founded by Marcel Fournier, a professor of law and moderate liberal, with the help of partners such as Pierre Waldeck-Rousseau. The first issue appeared in July 1894. The stated objective was to become "a safe and prudent guide for the elected representatives of universal suffrage and the cadres of democracy". Fournier wanted to discuss questions debated in parliament in more depth, and disseminate the views of specialists to the politicians. The journal was published in Paris and appeared monthly. Although the main focus was on parliamentary, legislative, and political matters, it also discussed economic and social questions. It gave a summary of political and parliamentary life in countries other than France.

In 1897 Fournier was made a Knight of the Legion of Honour. The former deputy and future senator Fernand Faure became director of the journal from 1901. He held this position until 1911. In the early 1900s the magazine published the competing views of Ferdinand Buisson, Charles Dupuy, and René Goblet on the role of the church in education. In 1910 Faure published articles on counting civil servants in France and the other main European countries.

In 1924 Paul Gueriot wrote on the two main positions in the debate over labour and immigration, a pressing issue given the labour shortage following World War I. The one group held that workers were a form of "human capital", and could be imported as needed, while the other held that humans were more than mere animals, and "the foreigner brings us a mentality different from our own, which cannot be fused with ours." From 1932 the supplement Le Bilan économique et financier de la France et de l'étranger (Economic and Financial Review of France and Abroad) was included in the magazine.

Georges Putot (1900–1989), a political economist who taught at the School for Advanced Studies in the Social Sciences from 1927 and became president of that school in 1965, edited the magazine from 1957 to 1961. In 1980 Guy Planadevall was director and Mario Guastoni was editor-in-chief. The magazine appeared bimonthly from July/August 1985, and then quarterly starting in 2004. The magazine has tended to focus on presidential and legislative elections, and has paid less attention to local elections. However, it did publish a special issue on the local elections of 2010.

== Sources ==
- "Back Matter", Reis: Revista Española de Investigaciones Sociológicas, 11 (11), Centro de Investigaciones Sociologicas, July–September 1980, JSTOR 40182831
- Bertrand, Michel (1996), Violences et pouvoirs politiques (in French), Presses Univ. du Mirail, ISBN 978-2-85816-243-7
- Camiscioli, Elisa (2009-08-28), Reproducing the French Race: Immigration, Intimacy, and Embodiment in the Early Twentieth Century, Duke University Press, ISBN 978-0-8223-9119-7
- "Chronique et Mélanges", Bibliothèque de l'École des Chartes (in French), 58, Librairie Droz: 500–506, 1897, JSTOR 43003859
- Dombrowsky, Patrick (2000), Cent ans d'enseignement supérieur (in French), Guillaume JOBIN, GGKEY:6QG8AA9PGDA
- Escalona, Fabien; Labouret, Simon; Vieira, Mathieu (2013-11-19), "France: regional Elections as 'Third Order' Elections?", Regional and National Elections in Western Europe: Territoriality of the Vote in Thirteen Countries, Springer, ISBN 978-1-137-02544-9
- Notre histoire (in French), Revue politique et parlementaire
- Revue politique et parlementaire (Paris) (in French), BnF: Bibliotheque nationale de France
- Ruiz, Émilien (April–June 2010), "Compter : l'invention de la statistique des fonctionnaires en France (1890-1930) / Counting: The invention of civil servant statistics in France (1890-1930)", Sociologie du Travail (in French), 52 (2), Elsevier Masson SAS: 212–233, doi:10.4000/sdt.13791, JSTOR 41931526
- "The Periodical Literature of Sociology", American Journal of Sociology, 2 (2), The University of Chicago Press: 320–322, September 1896, doi:10.1086/210618, JSTOR 2761680
