= Ivan Mikoyan =

Soviet and Russian aircraft designer (1927–2016)

- Вано Микоян; Վանո Միկոյան
- Born: Vano Anastasovich Mikoyan; 1 September 1927; Moscow, USSR
- Died: 25 November 2016 (aged 89); Moscow, Russia
- Education: Aviation Technical School in Stalinabad; Zhukovsky Air Force Engineering Academy
- Parent(s): Anastas Mikoyan; Ashkhen Lazarevna Tumanyan
- Engineering career
- Employer: Russian Aircraft Corporation MiG
- Projects: MiG-21; MiG-23; MiG-29
- Awards: Order of the Badge of Honour 1965; Order of the October Revolution 1974; USSR State Prize 1981, 1988

Vano "Ivan" Anastasi Mikoyan (Armenian: Վանո Անաստասի Միկոյան; Russian: Вано Анаста́сович Микоян; 1 September 1927 – 25 November 2016) was a Soviet Armenian aircraft designer and the son of the Old Bolshevik and high level Soviet statesman Anastas Mikoyan.

== Biography ==
In 1944–1945, he studied at the Aviation Technical School in Stalinabad, then graduated from the Zhukovsky Air Force Engineering Academy. From 1953 he worked in OKB Mikoyan as assistant chief engineer, chief engineer for flight tests, and as the leading designer for MiG-21 family of fighter aircraft. In 1965 he was appointed as the lead designer on the MiG-23 fighter aircraft, and the technical director of joint state tests after 1968. Starting in 1973, Ivan was deputy chief designer for the MiG-29 fighter aircraft. Later, he was an adviser for Russian Aircraft Corporation MiG.

Ivan was placed in charge of two OKB Mikoyan projects studying STOL fighter designs. One group studied of the swing-wing design (like the MiG-23) and the other delta wings (like the MiG-21) and lift jets instead of the swing wing.

As a teenager, Ivan was connected to a high-profile murder-suicide case in June 1943. His Walther pistol was borrowed and used by Volodia Shakhurin, son of the Aviation Minister Aleksey Shakhurin. Volodia killed himself and Nina Umanskaia, the 14-year-old daughter of Konstantin Umansky, who was just appointed as Soviet ambassador to Mexico, when Nina refused Volodia's request that she stay in Moscow. The event took place on Moscow's Stone Bridge.

== Honours and awards ==
Some of his awards and honours include:

- Order of the Badge of Honour (1965)
- Order of the October Revolution (1974)
- USSR State Prize (1981, 1988)
- Medal of Academician A.I. Mikoyan
