= Stepan Mikoyan =

Soviet test pilot

- Ստեփան Միկոյան
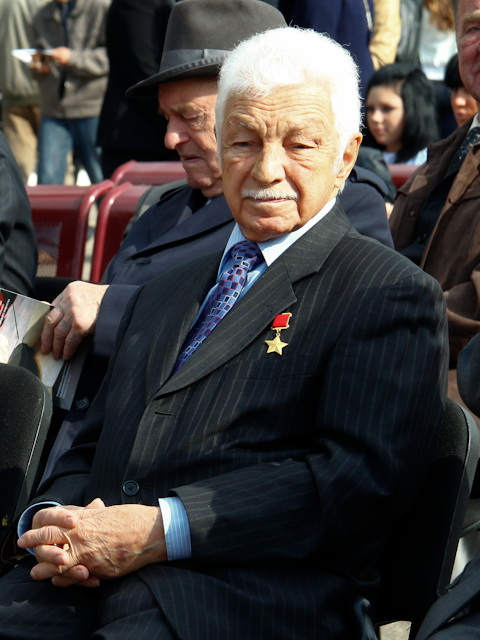
- Stepan Mikoyan in Moscow, Victory Park on Poklonnaya Hill.
- Born: 12 July 1922, Tbilisi.
- Died: 24 March 2017, Moscow (aged 94).
- Spouse: Eleonora Mikoyan (Lozovskaya)
- Children: 3
- Military career
- Allegiance: Soviet Union
- Branch: Soviet Air Forces
- Rank: Air Force lieutenant general
- Conflicts: World War 2; Great Patriotic War; Battle of Moscow; Battle of Stalingrad
- Awards: see below

Stepan Anastasi Mikoyan (Russian: Степан Анаста́сович Микоян, Armenian: Ստեփան Անաստասի Միկոյան; July 12, 1922, Tbilisi, Georgian SSR, TSFSR – March 24, 2017, Moscow, Russia) was a Soviet Armenian test pilot and the eldest son of the Old Bolshevik and high level Soviet statesman Anastas Mikoyan. His honors included Hero of the Soviet Union (1975), Lieutenant General of Aviation (1980), Honored Test Pilot of the USSR (1963), and Candidate of Technical Sciences (1978).

== Biography ==
Stepan Mikoyan was born on July 12, 1922, in Tbilisi into the family of the Soviet Politburo member and future Socialist Labor Hero and Minister of Foreign Trade Anastas Mikoyan. Stepan's father was a brother of renowned Soviet aircraft designer Artyom Mikoyan. Stepan had four brothers, two of whom also became pilots. He grew up in the Kremlin compound,playing with Stalin's own children, and went to flying school with Stalin's son Vasily.

He and his close friend Timur Frunze entered the Kacha Military Aviation School in August 1940. He graduated on September 3, 1941, in the city of Krasny Kut in the Saratov region, where the school was evacuated after the start of the Great Patriotic War. From December 1941, he fought as a fighter pilot in the Great Patriotic War. in the 8th Reserve Aviation Regiment (stationed at the Bagai-Baranovka airfield), he retrained on the Yak-1 fighter. In 1941–1942, he served in the 11th Fighter Aviation Regiment of the Moscow Air Defense. On January 16, 1942, he was mistakenly shot down by another Soviet fighter near the city of Istra in the Moscow Region. He managed to land his burning plane, after which he was taken to a medical battalion with third-degree burns to his hands, face, left leg, and right knee. He was treated in a hospital in Moscow. Upon returning from the hospital, he fought in the 32nd Guards Aviation Regiment near Stalingrad and on the Northwestern Front, and then in the 12th Guards Aviation Regiment of the Moscow Air Defense. In November 1942, Mikoyan was awarded the Order of the Red Banner for 14 combat sorties in December 1941, January and September 1942, Mikoyan shot down six enemy aircraft in three air battles. During the war, he mastered the Yak-1, Yak-7 and Yak-9 fighters; Stepan Mikoyan has six group victories to his credit.

From 1945 to 1951, he was a student at the engineering faculty of the Zhukovsky Air Force Engineering Academy. After graduation, he worked at the 929th State Flight Test Centre named for V. P. Chkalov: test pilot, lead engineer, from 1957 - deputy head of the 1st department for flight operations, from 1958 - assistant to the head of the institute for interception systems, from 1959 head of the 1st directorate, from December 1964 - deputy head of the Air Force State Research Institute.

He mastered 102 different types and modifications of aircraft, including the MiG-15, MiG-17, MiG-19, MiG-21, MiG-23, MiG-25, MiG-27, Su-15, Su-24, Mi-8, etc. He had a total flight time of about 3.5 thousand hours.

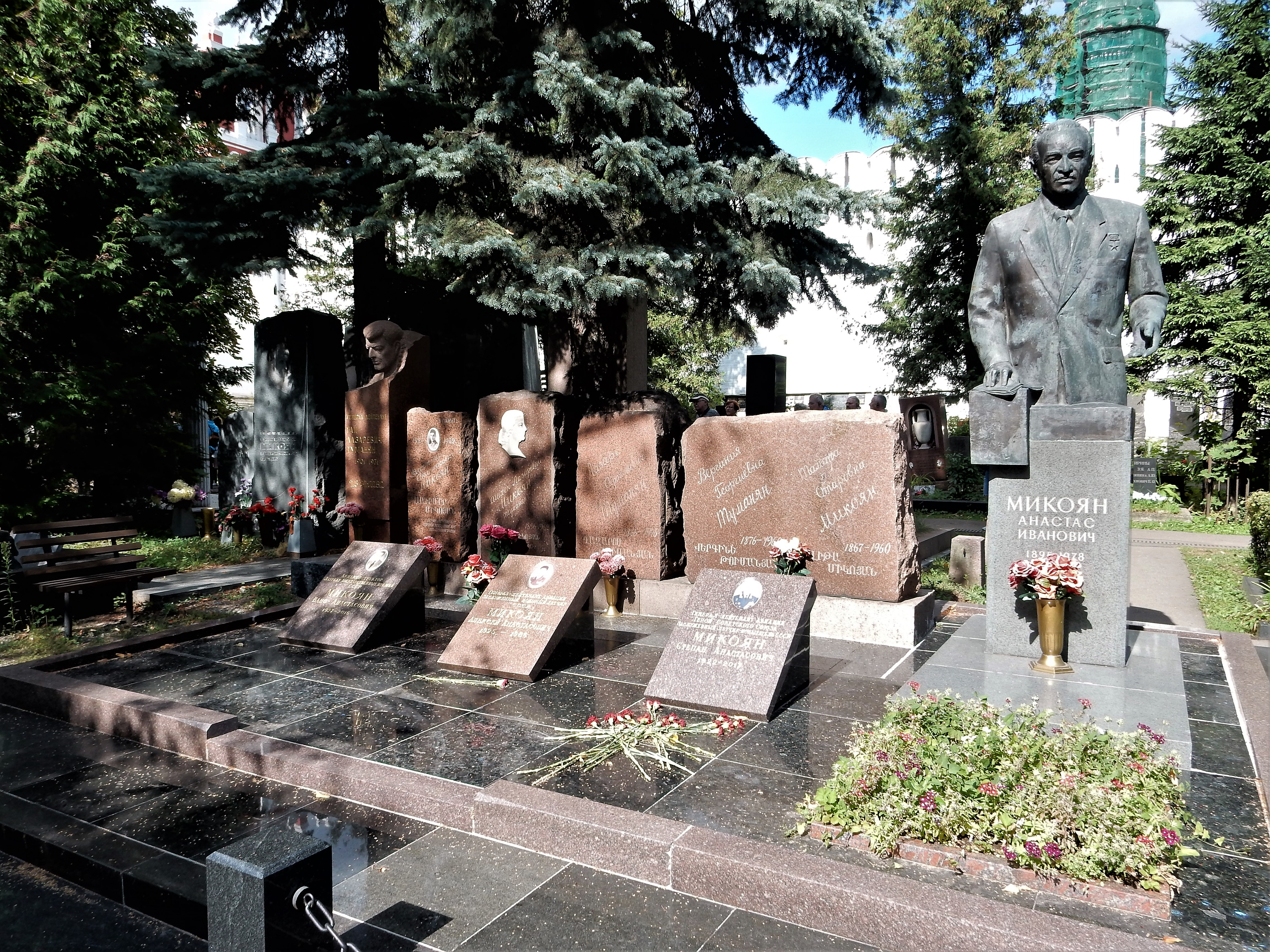
Graves of the Mikoyan Family at Novodevichy Cemetery, right Anastas Mikoyan, first row right Stepan Mikoyan.

Stepan Mikoyan died in Moscow, 2017, at the age of 94. Mikoyan was buried in Novodevichy Cemetery.

== Family ==
- Spouse; Mikoyan (Lozovskaya) Eleonora Petrovna (1922–2009), journalist, philologist, daughter of test pilot Pyotr Lozovsky.
- Son; Vladimir Stepanovich Mikoyan (born 1946), biophysicist.
- Daughter; Ashkhen Stepanovna Mikoyan (born 1949), philologist, candidate of philological sciences, associate professor of the Department of English Linguistics, Faculty of Philology, Moscow State University named after M.V. Lomonosov .
- Son; Alexander Stepanovich Mikoyan(born 1952), musician, race car driver.

== Filmography ==
- Battle for Moscow (1985), playing his father
- The Meaning of Life (1987)
- Stalingrad (1989), playing his father
- The Old Man and the Sky (2007)

== Published works ==
- Микоян С. А., Корбут А. Г. "Заход на посадку по приборам". Archived from the original on 2013-01-06. М.: Воениздат, 1979.
- Воспоминания лётчика-испытателя. - M. (in Russian). Издат. Дом "Техника-Молодежи". 2002. ISBN 5-93848-006-X.
- Степан Микоян (2006). Мы - дети войны. Воспоминания военного летчика-испытателя. Яуза. ISBN 5-699-18874-6.

== Awards ==
Medal of Zhukov
Medal "For the Victory over Germany in the Great Patriotic War"
Order of the Red Banner (23 November 1942)

Order of Lenin (3 April 1975)
Four Order of the Red Star (22 August 1944, 30 December 1956, 29 April 1957, 24 November 1966)
Hero of the Soviet Union, (3 April 1975)
Order of the Patriotic War 1st class
Medal "For Battle Merit"
Medal "For the Defence of Moscow"
Medal "For the Defence of Stalingrad"
Medal "For the Development of Virgin Lands"
Medal "Veteran of Labour"
Jubilee Medal "60 Years of Victory in the Great Patriotic War 1941–1945"
Jubilee Medal "50 Years of Victory in the Great Patriotic War 1941–1945"
Medal "Veteran of the Armed Forces of the USSR"
Medal "In Commemoration of the 850th Anniversary of Moscow"
Medal "Veteran of the Armed Forces of the USSR"
Jubilee Medal "65 Years of Victory in the Great Patriotic War 1941–1945"
Merited Test Pilot of the USSR (10 December 1963)
Jubilee Medal "Forty Years of Victory in the Great Patriotic War 1941–1945"
Jubilee Medal "70 Years of Victory in the Great Patriotic War 1941–1945"
