= Co-operative economics =

Study of autonomous associations' interactions with production and distribution

Cooperative (or co-operative) economics is a field of economics that incorporates cooperative studies and political economy toward the study and management of cooperatives.

== History ==
Cooperative economics developed as both a theory and a concrete alternative to industrial capitalism in the late 1700s and early 1800s. As such, it was a form of stateless socialism. The term socialism, in fact, was coined in The Cooperative Magazine in 1827. Such socialisms arose in response to the negative effects of industrialism, where various clergymen, workers, and industrialists in England, such as Robert Owen, experimented with various models of collective farming and community housing with varying degrees of success. This movement was often integrated with other progressive movements of the era such as women's suffrage and abolitionism.

"British industrialist Robert Owen (1771–1858) founded a model factory town around his cotton mill and later established a model socialist community, New Harmony, in Indiana. Some proponents of women's rights, such as Emma Martin (1812–1851) in Britain and Flora Tristan (1801–1844) in France, stirred controversy by promoting socialism as the solution to female oppression."

While state socialism was growing popular, rising in the early 1900s, followed by collapse in the 20th century, the cooperative movement grew exponentially in all countries affected by socialism and British colonialism, such as Canada, the U.S., South Africa, and across Europe. Jessica Gordon Nembhard has produced one of the most thorough academic monographs on cooperative economics entitled Collective Courage: A History of African American Cooperative Economic Thought and Practice, which looks at how African American communities organized to survive white nationalism, capitalism, and colonialism in the 20th century. The International Cooperative Alliance (ICA) was formed in 1895 and National Cooperative Business Association founded in 1916.

The post-WWII era experienced a decline in interest towards cooperatives in the economics profession, with much lower quality and quantity of the discussion on cooperatives in economics text books published after the war compared to those published before the war.

The University of Wisconsin Center for Cooperatives was founded in 1962, which was possibly the first organization to collect data on cooperatives. In 2000, the Democracy Collaborative was created out of the University of Maryland, which – among other things – facilitates the creation and development of cooperatives. In 2004 the United States Federation of Worker Cooperatives (USFWC) was founded, which, like the ICA, facilitates worker cooperatives (see "Types and Structures of Cooperatives" below). The ongoing success of cooperative economics in providing more effective alternatives to capitalist firms was so significant by the 21st century that the United Nations Assembly

"...declared 2012 as the International Year of Cooperatives, highlighting the contribution of cooperatives to socio-economic development, in particular recognizing their impact on poverty reduction, employment generation and social integration."

Contemporary cooperative economics has gained even further popularity since 2012, with numerous TED talks dedicated to the subject; they demonstrate how cooperative economics is able to solve problems in housing, food, and poverty that modern industrial countries have so far been unable to solve. In 2013, the USFWC spawned the Democracy at Work Institute, a sister organization that also facilitates the growth, creation, and conversion of worker cooperatives.

In February of 2024, the United Nations General Assembly declared 2025 the "UN International Year of Cooperatives."

== Types and structures of cooperatives ==
=== General structures ===
There are generally four major types of cooperative organizations:

1. Consumer cooperatives, in which the consumers of a co-operative's goods and services are defined as its members (including retail food co-operatives and grocery stores, credit unions, etc.) (Example: REI, federal credit unions, etc.)
2. Worker cooperatives, which are co-owned and democratically co-managed by workers/contributors. (Example: Home-Care Associates, The Driver's Cooperative, Means TV, etc.)
3. Producer Cooperative (or "Contributor" Cooperative), which are co-owned by major producers/contributors instead of every worker. (Example: Stewart Healthcare, Land O’ Lakes, OceanSpray, Zen-Ho)
4. Purchasing Cooperative (or "Supply" or "Distribution" Cooperative), which are co-owned by member organizations, which consolidate into a group in order to aggregate demand (i.e., buy in bulk)—which reduces purchase costs. This may include everything from school supplies to medical supplies. (Example: Ace Hardware, True Value, NAPA Autoparts).

The equity structures of cooperatives are therefore various and unlimited. Some implement private/investor equity while others do not. Since the broad purpose of cooperatives is to offer different power structures than ordinary capitalist institutions (which are owned by profit-seekers that may or may not work at the firm), as well as to improve the economic and social life of workers and all who are involved beyond mere profit and creating products/services, there is much internal debate about what is truly cooperative, democratic, etc. For example, if a firm is 60% owned by private investors and 40% owned by workers, this would generally not be considered a worker cooperative. ESOPs are also not considered cooperatives even if workers own 100% of the firm, because of the usual lack of democratic governance.

=== Legal structures ===
Cooperatives may take on different legal structures depending on jurisdiction, such as an LLC, ESOP, 503c non-profit, or a distinctive cooperative legal structure (if the state provides for one, such as Massachusetts). ESOPs (Equity Stock Ownership Plans, where workers own shares for retirement) that implement democratic governance are colloquially referred to as "ESOPeratives."

In 1996, New Zealand passed the Cooperative Companies Act. In 2003 the Statute for a European Cooperative Society created a specific legal structure for cooperatives in the EU.

== Facts and figures on cooperatives ==
1. There are about 3 million cooperatives on the planet.
2. 12% of global humanity is a member of a cooperative.
3. 1 in 3 Americans are coop members.
4. 1.5 million Americans live in a housing cooperative.
5. Cooperatives electrically power 56% of the United States' landmass and 42 million people.
6. Coops possess over $1 trillion in assets worldwide and over $640 billion in annual sales.
7. 92 million Americans turn to 7,500 credit unions (client-owned cooperatives) for financial services; 50,000 American families rely on cooperative day-care facilities.
8. The Navy Federal Credit Union (founded 1933) is the world's largest credit union with 10.8 million members, 345 branches, and $147.9 billion in assets, serving the men and women of the Armed Forces, Department of Defense, veterans and their families.
9. The largest worker-cooperative is Mondragon Corporation in Spain, which has over 80,000 associates (workers).
10. The largest cooperative sector by membership is mutual insurance, with over a quarter million members.

The most comprehensive data collection on the largest cooperatives comes from the World Cooperative Monitor.

== Distinctives ==
Cooperatives are different from conventional firms in that the purpose of the firm is not to profit shareholders, but to benefit its members (whether workers, consumers, suppliers or purchasers). Because parts of the cooperative movement were anti-capitalist but not as revolutionary as Marx (who aimed to abolish all private property), Marx and Marxists were hesitant about supporting the cooperative movement (especially consumer cooperatives) in the 19th century. The value of consumer vs. worker cooperatives continues to be debated by theorists, activists, and scholars (see below).

The International Cooperative Alliance provides seven principles of cooperatives, each that contrasts with capitalist firms:

1. "Voluntary and Open Membership" (in contrast to coerced/involuntary participation)
2. "Democratic Member Control" (in contrast to nondemocratic control)
3. "Member Economic Participation" (in contrast to purely transactional relationships and closed-book management)
4. "Autonomy and Independence" (in contrast to state-owned or corporate-ownership)
5. "Education, Training, and Information" (in contrast to "mushroom management" where workers are "kept in the dark," and information is intentionally funneled through power channels)
6. "Cooperation among Cooperatives" (in contrast to competition amongst firms)
7. "Concern for Community" (in contrast to purely product or profit-oriented concerns)

An earlier summary of cooperative principles is called the Rochdale Principles.

Governments may define cooperative enterprises with a simplified version of the above principles. For example, the Australian government defines a cooperative enterprise as follows:

"They serve their members by providing goods and services that may be unavailable or too costly to access as individuals. They share costs and carry on their enterprise under principles of:

- non-discrimination
- democracy
- independence
- education and care for communities."

Cooperative economics is also distinct enough from capitalist economics in the public square that it has established and maintains its own domain (.coop).

=== Cooperatives and Sustainability ===
Jeffrey Sachs, an economist who works with the United Nations, has emphasized the centrality of cooperative models of economics for the future survival of our species; though he pays little attention to actual cooperative enterprises and their development as more sustainable and humane models of production, he nevertheless contends more broadly that humans must "forge a new era of cooperation on a global scale" in order to survive.

Elinor Ostrom, the first woman to receive the Nobel Prize in economics, demonstrated the ability of cooperative enterprises and organizations to effectively manage environmental goods more than strictly political or market means.

Forestry and electricity cooperatives are some of the largest in the world, which puts them in a unique position to address the negative effects of climate change. E. G. Nadeau provides some examples of what this means in his popular introduction to cooperative economics, The Cooperative Solution:

"Dairyland Power Cooperative, based in Wisconsin, has been a national leader in promoting the use of methane gas derived from cow manure as an energy resource. Kauai Island Utility Cooperative, the youngest generation and transmission cooperative in the United States, "is aggressively pursuing diversification of its energy portfolio to include a growing percentage of hydropower, photovoltaic, bio-fuel, and biomass"

Jessica Gordon Nembhard in her monograph Collective Courage concludes that:

…cooperatives…use a sense of solidarity and concern for community to promote economic alternatives that create economic growth and sustainability. At the same time, their solidarity and collective action increase productivity and help stabilize their economic circumstances. Moreover, cooperative economics is often viewed as a tool or strategy of a larger movement toward the elimination of economic exploitation and the transition to a new social order.

The open-access reference work The Routledge Handbook to Cooperative Economics and Management features an entire Section on Sustainability, demonstrating the relationship between cooperative economics and ecological sustainability.

== Relevant organizations ==
=== National and international cooperative associations ===
- International Cooperative Alliance
- United States Federation of Worker Cooperatives
- Canadian Worker Coop Federation
- Cooperatives UK
- Co-Op Federation (Australia)
- National Cooperative Business Association
- National Association of Housing Cooperatives
- National Cooperative Grocers Association

=== Cooperative organizations ===
- Democracy at Work
- Cooperation Jackson
- Grassroots Economic Organizing
- Jobs With Justice
- Platform Cooperativism Consortium
- Purpose
- The Institute for Christian Socialism
- The Southeast Center for Cooperative Development
- The Working World
- The New Economy Coalition
- Zebras Unite

=== Cooperative funding and finance ===
- Community Wealth
- National Consumer Cooperative Bank
- Association of Corporate Credit Unions
- Cooperative Finance Corporation
- Federal Home Loan Bank System
- Community Purchasing Alliance
- Capital Impact
- Cooperative Development Foundation
- Seed Commons
- Shared Capital Cooperative
- Transform Finance

== Major figures ==
Notable theoreticians and activists who have contributed to the field include Robert Owen, Pierre-Joseph Proudhon, Charles Gide, Beatrice and Sydney Webb, J.T.W. Mitchell, Peter Kropotkin, Paul Lambert, Race Mathews, David Griffiths, and G.D.H. Cole. Additional theorists include John Stuart Mill, Laurence Gronlund, Leland Stanford, and modern theoretical work by Elinor Ostrom, Benjamin Ward, Jaroslav Vanek, David Ellerman, and Anna Milford and Roger McCain. Additional modern thinkers include Nathan Schneider, John Restakis, Joyce Rothschild, Joerg Rieger, Rosemarie Henkel-Rieger, Jessica Gordon Nembhard, Corey Rosen et al., William Foote Whyte, Gar Alperovitz, Seymour Melman, Mario Bunge, Richard D. Wolff and David Schweickart. In Europe, important contributions came from England and Italy, especially from Will Bartlett, Virginie Perotin, Bruno Jossa, Stefano Zamagni, Carlo Borzaga, Jacques Defourny and Tom Winters.

== Cooperative federalism versus co-operative individualism ==
A major historical debate in cooperative economics has been between cooperative federalism and co-operative individualism. In an Owenite village of cooperation or a commune, the residents would be both the producers and consumers of its products. However, for co-operative enterprise other than communes, the producers and consumers of its products are two different groups of people, and usually only one of these groups is given the status of members (or co-owners).

The differences in goals, purpose, and power between worker and consumer cooperatives has led to a debate between those who support consumer co-operatives (known as co-operative federalists) and those who favor worker co-operatives (pejoratively labelled 'individualist' co-operativists by the federalists).

=== Cooperative federalism ===
Cooperative federalism is the school of thought favouring consumer cooperative societies. Historically, its proponents have included JTW Mitchell and Charles Gide, as well as Paul Lambert and Beatrice Webb. Co-operative federalists argue that consumers should form co-operative wholesale societies (co-operative federations in which all members are co-operators, the best historical example of which being CWS in the United Kingdom), and that these co-operative wholesale societies should undertake purchasing farms or factories. They argue that profits (or surpluses) from these co-operative wholesale societies should be paid as dividends to the member co-operators, rather than to their workers.

=== Cooperative individualism ===
Cooperative individualism is the school of thought favouring workers' co-operatives. The most notable proponents of workers' co-operatives are, in Britain, the Christian socialists and later writers like Joseph Reeves who put this forth as a path to state socialism. Where co-operative federalists argue for federations in which consumer co-operators federate and receive the monetary dividends, rather, in co-operative wholesale societies the profits (or surpluses) would be paid as dividends to their workers. The Mondragón Co-operatives in Spain are commonly cited by co-operative individualists and a lot of co-operative individualist literature deals with these societies. The Mondragón Cooperative Corporation has drawn so much attention because in 2010 it was the seventh-largest company in Spain. It consists of about 250 different worker cooperative businesses. The business model they use includes "extensive integration and solidarity with employees", worker involvement in policy and committees, a "transparent" wage system, and "full practice of democratic control". These two schools of thought are not necessarily in opposition, and hybrids of the two positions are possible.

James Warbasse's work, and more recently Johnston Birchall's, provide perspectives on the breadth of co-operative development nationally and internationally. Benjamin Ward provided a formal treatment to begin an evaluation of "market syndicalism." Jaroslav Vanek wrote a comprehensive work in an attempt to address cooperativism in economic terms and a "labor-managed economy." David Ellerman began by considering legal philosophic aspects of co-operatives, developing the "labor theory of property." In 2007 he used the classical economic premise in formulating his argument deconstructing the myth of capital rights to ownership. Anna Milford has constructed a detailed theoretical examination of co-operatives in controlled buyer markets (monopsony), and the implications for fair trade strategies.

== Other schools ==
=== Socialism and anarchism ===
Socialists and anarchists, such as anarcho-communists and anarcho-syndicalists, view society as one big cooperative, and feel that goods produced by all should be distributed equitably to all members of the society, not necessarily through a market. All the members of a society are considered to be both producers and consumers. State socialists tend to favor government administration of the economy, while anarchists and libertarian socialists favor non-governmental coordination, either locally, or through labor unions and worker cooperatives. Although there is some debate as Bakunin and the collectivists favored market distribution using currency, collectivizing production, not consumption. Left libertarians collectivize neither but define their leftness as inalienable rights to the commons, not collective ownership of it, thus rejecting Lockean homesteading.

Utopian socialists feel socialism can be achieved without class struggle and that cooperatives should only include those who voluntarily choose to participate in them. Some participants in the kibbutz movement and other intentional communities fall into this category.

=== Co-operative commonwealth ===
In some co-operative economics literature, the aim is the achievement of a co-operative commonwealth, a society based on cooperative and socialist principles. Co-operative economists – federalist, individualist, and otherwise – have presented the extension of their economic model to its natural limits as a goal.

The term "co-operative commonwealth" came into more-general use due to Laurence Gronlund's popular 1884 book, The Cooperative Commonwealth.

This ideal was widely supported in early-twentieth century U.S. and Canadian leftist circles. Bostonian free-lance academic Frank Parsons was among those who pursued the concept. Upton Sinclair's 1907 book The Millennium envisions the few survivors of an apocalypse forming a "co-operative commonwealth". Gronlund's ideal, and the language behind it, were central to the formation of Canada's Co-operative Commonwealth Federation party in 1932, which became Canada's largest left-wing political party, and continues to this day as the New Democratic Party. His ideas were also important to the economic principles of the Farmer-Labor Party of the United States, particularly in the FLP's Minnesota affiliate, where advocacy for a co-operative commonwealth formed the central theme of the party's platform from 1934, until the 1944 founding of the Democratic–Farmer–Labor Party.

Co-operative commonwealth ideas were also developed in Great Britain and Ireland from the 1880s by William Morris, which also inspired the guild socialist movement for associative democracy from 1906 right through the 1920s. Guild socialist thinkers included Bertrand Russell, R. H. Tawney and G. D. H. Cole.

=== Employee ownership ===
Some economists have argued that economic democracy could be achieved by combining employee ownership on a national scale (including worker cooperatives) within a free market apparatus. Tom Winters argues that "as with the free market more generally, it is not free trade itself that creates inequality, it’s how free trade is used, who benefits from it and who does not."

== Cooperative microeconomics ==
According to Hervé Moulin, cooperation from a game-theoretic point of view ("in the economic tradition") is the mutual assistance between egoists. He distinguishes three modes of such cooperation:

1. decentralised behaviour, where the collective outcome results from the strategic decisions of selfish agents;
2. arbitration (by a mechanical formula or benevolent dictator) about actions on the basis of normative principles;
3. direct agreement between agents after face-to-face bargaining.

These modes are present in every cooperative institution but their virtues are often logically incompatible.

== See also ==
- Economic democracy
- History of the cooperative movement
- Market socialism
- Rochdale Principles
- Syndicalism
