= Cooperative federalism (economics) =

Favoring consumers' co-operative societies

Cooperative federalism is a school of thought in the field of cooperative economics. Historically, its proponents have included J.T.W. Mitchell, Charles Gide, Paul Lambert, and Beatrice Webb (who coined the term in her book The Co-operative Movement in Great Britain).

== Cooperative federalism versus cooperative individualism ==
Cooperative federalism has been one side in the historical debate in cooperative economics between cooperative federalism and cooperative Individualism. In an Owenite village of co-operation or a commune, the residents would be both the producers and consumers of its products. However, for a cooperative, the producers and consumers of its products become two different groups of people, and thus, there are two different sets of people who could be defined as its 'users'. As a result, we can define two different modes of cooperative organisation: consumers' cooperatives, in which the consumers of a cooperatives goods and services are defined as its users (including food cooperatives, credit unions, etc.), and producer cooperatives, in which the producers of a cooperative's goods and services are defined as its users (which includes worker cooperatives, agricultural producer cooperatives, for example), as advocated by cooperative individualism.

In this debate, cooperative federalists are those who support consumers' cooperatives, and those who favor producers cooperatives have been pejoratively labelled ‘individualist' cooperativists by the federalists.

== Cooperative federalism ==
Cooperative federalism is the school of thought favouring consumers' cooperative societies. The cooperative federalists have argued that consumers' cooperatives should form cooperative wholesale societies (by forming cooperatives in which all members are cooperatives, the best historical example being the English CWS) and that these federal cooperatives should undertake purchasing farms or factories. They argued that profits (or surpluses) from these CWSes should be paid as dividends to the member cooperatives, rather than to their workers.

== What consumers’ cooperation does ==
Below is an account of: ‘What Consumers’ Cooperation does,’ excerpted from the May, 1934, issue of Cooperation, which provides an outline of cooperative federalist thought:

Consumers' Cooperation is the Economic System necessary to match the Age of Automatic Power Production. It is a democratic economic system based on "cooperation for use" and not "competition for profit." It is the Economy of Abundance instead of Scarcity. These are some of its proven Principles and Practices—which really make "life, liberty and the pursuit of happiness" possible for ALL.

Consumers' Cooperation means Consumers' Ownership and Control. In as much as consumers furnish the market, which is the most essential thing in an economy of abundance, organized consumers must have the ownership and control of the means of production and distribution so that they can regulate production to their needs of consumption, can supply themselves with pure products without adulteration, and do so without competitive wastes in the processes of production and distribution.

Consumers' Cooperation is Economic Democracy. Consumers, who are everybody, become the owners. Voting is by person and not by property -- one person, one vote. Proxy voting is eliminated -— members must attend meetings and be active. Membership is open to everyone. We now have management control largely in industry, not even stockholder control. Under a cooperative system consumers control and the management executes their will.

Consumers' Cooperatives Distribute Profits Justly. So-called profits, which in cooperatives are really overcharges or savings, are paid back to the consumer-member-owners on the basis of purchases, as patronage refunds. Those who produce the profits get them in proportion to the contribution they make towards them by their purchases. John T. W. Mitchell, the great leader of the C.W.S. says, "Those who pay the profits should get them back."

Consumers' Cooperation results in Security -— not Speculation. Capital is hired at the lowest cost. A minimum rate of interest is paid. There are no excessive earnings for investors so there is no watering of stock to cover them up. Stock cannot be sold at more than par value. Consumers' cooperatives require no governmental stock market security regulation because there is no speculation in cooperative stocks.

Consumers' Cooperation Increases the Income of Every Consumer-Member. A 10% patronage refund on regular retail prices means one ninth more food, goods and services.

Consumers' Cooperatives Pay Fair Salaries. They are large enough to secure trained experts for managing large scale industry, but not excessive, as under the present management control of corporation policies and payrolls.

Consumers' Cooperatives Abolish Secrecy. Whatever cannot survive in the open in a democracy is wrong. Balance Sheets. Profit and Loss Statements and every other figure and fact are open to consumer-member-owners in a cooperative. It is the business of all.

Consumers' Cooperatives Strive for Cash Business, not Credit. Credit was said by one of the men who organized the first Rochdale Cooperative in England to be "The invention of the Devil." The only real reasons for credit business are competition for customers and inequality in the distribution of wealth, both of which cooperation eliminates. Under Consumers' Cooperation the money you invest buys a stock of goods which is carried on hand. The cash you then pay for each purchase enables the inventory to be replenished, ready for you the next time you need it.

Consumers' Cooperation Produces Pure Food and Goods, not shoddy products nor poison for profit. There is no reason for adulteration when consumers own their own business and buy for themselves. Deception is the result of the attempt to make more private profit for a few owners. Under cooperation the truth can be told in advertising and over the counter.

Consumers' Cooperation Prevents Waste and Produces True Economy. Duplicated milk wagons, delivery trucks, and all the wastes of competitive factories and distribution systems organized as a result of the urge for private profits are eliminated under cooperation. These wasted hours of working time can be saved and used for real culture and recreation and not for fighting one another like barbarians—even though today -men use gloved hands to grab the most.

Consumers' Cooperatives Promote Peace. They are the necessary economic foundation to prevent war, which is caused by competition for markets to dispose of the surpluses that capitalism cannot distribute among the workers who produce the food and goods. Cooperatives remove the barriers to trade.

Consumers' Cooperative Ownership and Control of Industry is the Key that we must adopt to open the door of Plenty for All. It will distribute the piled up surpluses which automatic power driven machinery has produced.

Consumers' Cooperative Organization Gives the People Ownership, which Workers' Organizations do not. We have thought of ourselves as producers and organized into occupational groups. "For a century and a half," says Professor Fairchild, who wrote the book "Profits or Prosperity," "we have been trained to think of ourselves as producers instead of as consumers -- one of the most remarkable instances of inverted logic on a large scale that mankind has ever displayed." Organizing as producers is, as Beatrice Webb says, organizing the servant side of our lives, while organizing as consumers is organizing as masters of our lives. George W. Russell says, that when we organize as producers and not as consumers we are like an army that gives back to the enemy all it has won at the end of each week. Organizing as producers only is "fighting with one hand behind our backs." Organizing as consumers into Cooperatives will give us ownership and real power. The dollar we spend is more powerful than the dollar we get.

Consumers' Cooperative Organization Gives Us Democratic Liberty with Economic Justice which Political State Organizations Do Not. Political State organizations suppress liberty.—they are compulsory. Consumers' Cooperation gives us economic democracy—it is voluntary. While we are getting economic justice we must also have democratic freedom.

Consumers' Cooperation will Complete the Struggle for Liberty and Justice for ALL. We have deceived ourselves into thinking that religious, educational and political liberty were really possible without economic liberty and justice. Now we know they are not. Consumers' Cooperation finally fulfills liberty and justice for ALL. It gives every consumer equality in the control of business. It is democracy in our economic life.
