= Co-operative wholesale society =

Type of co-operative wholesaler

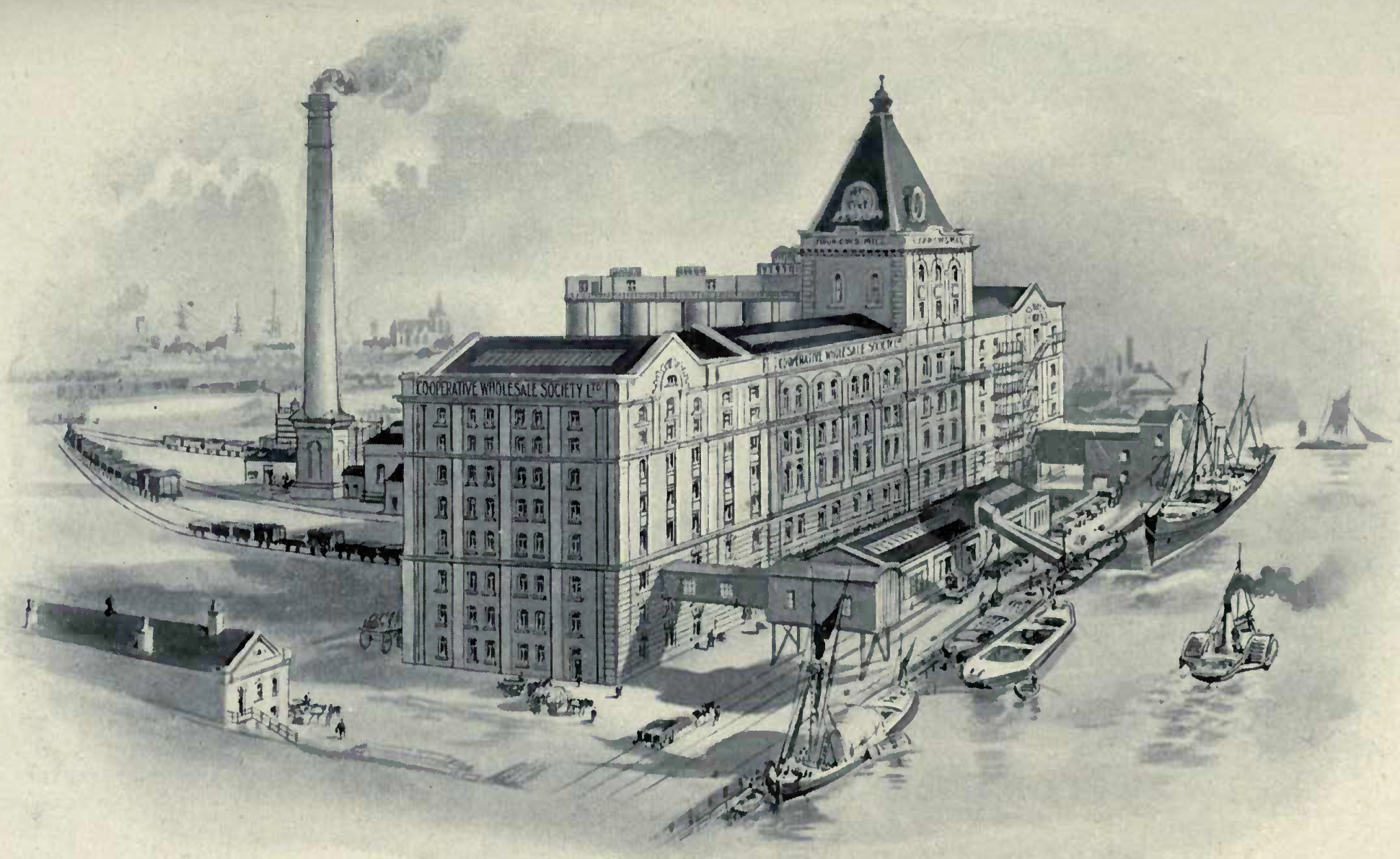
CWS flour mill in Silvertown, London, c. 1915

A co-operative wholesale society (CWS) is a form of co-operative federation (that is, a co-operative in which all the members are co-operatives), in this case, the members are usually consumers' co-operatives.

The theory, practice and history of the CWS in the pioneering British Co-operative Movement was recorded and expounded by Beatrice Potter in 1891, revised by Carr-Saunders et al. in 1938, to document its economic, social and political dimensions. According to co-operative economist Charles Gide, the aim of a co-operative wholesale society is to arrange “bulk purchases, and, if possible, organise production.” In other words, a co-operative wholesale society is a form of federal co-operative through which consumers co-operatives can collectively purchase goods at wholesale prices, and in some cases collectively own factories or farms.

The best historical examples of this are the English CWS and the Scottish SCWS, which are the predecessors of the 21st century Co-operative Group. Indeed, in Britain, the terms Co-operative Wholesale Society and CWS are used to refer to this specific organisation rather than the organisational form. However, the English CWS has inspired many imitations around the world (including, for example, the New South Wales Co-operative Wholesale Society that have also described themselves as co-operative wholesale societies.

== Bibliographical history ==
- The Story of the C.W.S. (The Jubilee History of the Co-operative Wholesale Society 1863-1913 by Percy Redfern) viii, 439, [1] p.; tables & illustrations, includes lists of officials, and photographs of buildings and some officials. Includes graphs on thin paper relating to economic history from 1860 to 1912, by G. H. Wood.
- The New History of the C.W.S. by Percy Redfern. xiv, 624 p.; illustrated. London: J. M. Dent, 1938. "First published in October, 1938, on the completion of seventy-five years of the Co-operative Wholesale Society limited." "Note on documentary sources": pp. 527–530: "Biographical supplement": pp. [565]-589.

== Co-operative federalism ==
Co-operative wholesale societies advocated co-operative federalism, a strand or school of thought in co-operative economics that advocates consumer co-operative societies. The pioneering co-operative federalists argued that consumers' co-operatives should form co-operative wholesale societies and that, through such arrangements, they should purchase farms, factories and, later, banks and insurance companies. Any profits (or surpluses) made by a CWS should be paid as dividends to its owners, the proprietary co-operative consumer societies.

== See also ==
- List of co-operative federations
