= Nembhard =

Nembhard is a surname. Notable people with the surname include:

- Canadian basketball players and brothers:
  - Andrew Nembhard (born 2000)
  - Ryan Nembhard (born 2003)
- Deshawon Nembhard (born 1994), Belizean footballer
- Harriet Nembhard (born 1967), American academic
- Jessica Gordon Nembhard (born 1956), American political economist
- Father-and-son American basketball players:
  - Ruben Nembhard (born 1972)
  - RJ Nembhard (born 1999)
