= Société de l'industrie minérale =

French professional association

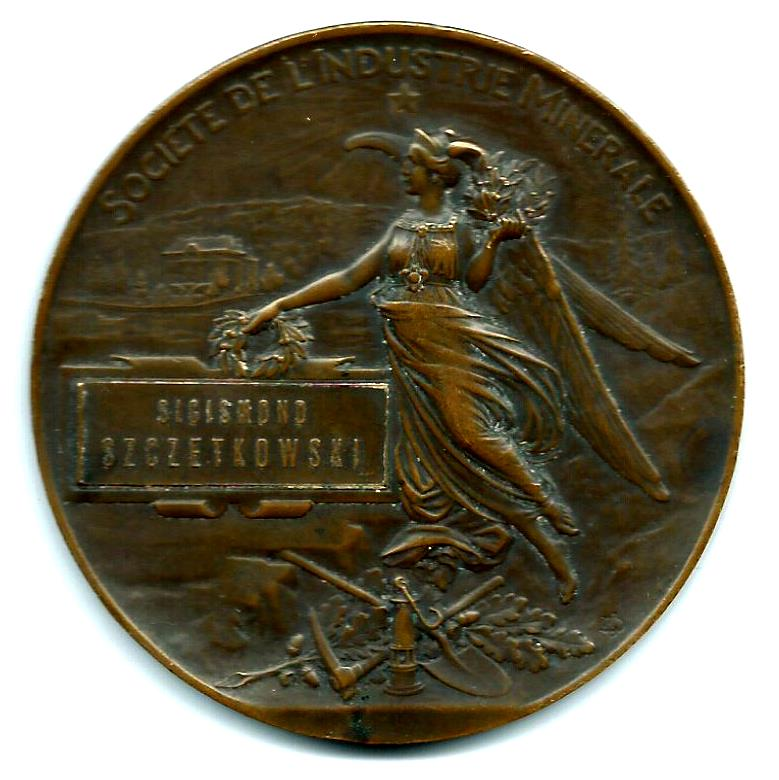
- Medal with the name of Zygmunt Szczotkowski designed by Georges Dupré^{(fr)}
- Abbreviation: SIM
- Formation: April 29, 1855; 170 years ago
- Founder: Emmanuel-Louis Gruner
- Founded at: Saint-Étienne
- Official language: French
- Main organ: Mines & Carrières
- Website: www.lasim.org

The Société de l'industrie minérale (French pronunciation: [sɔsjete də lɛ̃dystʁi mineʁal], lit. 'Mineral Industry Society', abbr. SIM) is a French association of mineral processing companies and people involved in these industries. It was created in 1855. It supports exchange of information on mining through its journals, website, meetings and congresses, and represents the mining industry in various forums.

== Functions ==
The Société de l'industrie minérale (SIM) is a non-profit organization that serves all francophone countries and participates in many international organizations. It has nine districts in France and a group in Belgium. Its goal is to promote and disseminate scientific and technical knowledge related to mineral substances. It covers all aspects of the mineral industry from prospecting through extraction and processing to post-use treatment and recycling. It communicates through its publications, its website and through the events it organizes, which include technical days and an annual congress and exhibition. As of 2012, there were 250 stands of materials suppliers and service providers at the exhibition.

== History ==
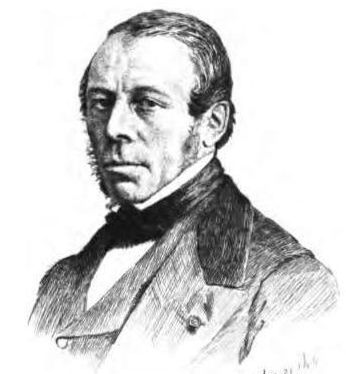
Emmanuel-Louis Gruner

The Société de l'industrie minérale was the brainchild of the mining engineer Emmanuel-Louis Gruner, who became the first president. It was founded on 29 April 1855, in Saint-Étienne with the stated goal of contributing to advances in the art of mining, metallurgy and related industries. Regional districts were created in 1860. The first congress of the SIM was held in 1875 in Saint-Étienne. On 5 March 1879, the society was recognized as a public utility.

Édouard Gruner (1849–1933), son of Emmanuel-Louis Gruner, was president of the Société d'encouragement pour l'industrie nationale from 1907 to 1909. He was also president of the Houillères de la Haute-Loire, Aciéries de Paris et d'Outreau and the Société de l'industrie minérale (1922–1933), and was an advocate at the Musée social for these employer interests groups.

In 1952, the SIM districts organized the first of the annual congresses. In 1955, on the centenary of the SIM, study days and exhibitions were staged in Saint-Etienne and Paris In 1985, a French National Committee distinct from the SIM was created for French representation at the World Mining Congress. The society's head office was transferred to Paris on 19 July 1990.

== Publications ==
The society's Bulletin included papers and reports on subjects of interest to miners and metallurgists. Gruner published his own work in the Bulletin from 1855 to 1858 and supported it with his advice after leaving Saint-Etienne to become professor of metallurgy in Paris. The Bulletin's July–September 1855 issue had an article on the goals of the society by Gruner followed by articles on ventilation, fuel efficiency, the mineral trade of Marseille, metal prices and so on.

The Bulletin became a monthly publication in 1909. In 1921, it was renamed the Revue de l'industrie minérale (RIM: Mineral Industry Review). In 1988, it became Mines & Carrières (Mines & Quarries), published monthly with a bimonthly supplement Les Techniques. The quarterly Recyclage & Valorisation (Recycling & Recovery) was launched in 2003. Other publications include the World Mining and Metals Yearbook : Annuaire statistique mondial des minerais et métaux, published in association with the Bureau de Recherches Géologiques et Minières.

== Presidents ==
Presidents of the society have been:

- Emmanuel-Louis Gruner (1855–1858)
- Charles-Romain Lan^{(fr)} (1859–1860)
- Étienne Dupont (1860–1868)
- Mathieu Cacarrié (1868–1873)
- Henri de Cizancourt (1874–1880)
- Charles Castel (1880–1898)
- Louis Tauzin (1898–1921)
- Henri Chipart (1921–1922)
- Édouard Gruner (1922–1933)
- Jacques Taffanel^{(fr)} (1934–1946)
- Georges Perrin-Pelletier (1946–1950)
- Louis Neltner (1950–1953)
- Roger Cadel (1954–1956)
- François Margand (1957–1967)
- Maurice Mangez (1967–1972)
- Raymond Cheradame (1972–1978)
- Pierre-Julien Couture (1978–1984)
- Jean Bailly (1984–1990)
- Claude Beaumont (1990–1995)
- Christian Guizol (1995–2001)
- Michel Sindzingre (2001–2007)
- Gérard Jourdan (2007–2013)
- Gilles Roch (2013-2019)
- Thierry Meilland-Rey (From 2019)

== Sources ==
- Bulletin de la Société de l'industrie minérale (in French), vol. 1, Saint-Étienne: Société de l'industrie minérale / Impr. de Théolier aîné, July–September 1855
- Gentilhomme, Philippe; Angel, Jean-Michel (2008), World Mining and Metals Yearbook (PDF), BRGM/SIM
- Histoire (in French), Société d'encouragement pour l'industrie nationale
- Historique (in French), SIM: Société de l'industrie minérale
- Horne, Janet R. (2002-01-11), A Social Laboratory for Modern France: The Musée Social and the Rise of the Welfare State, Duke University Press, ISBN 0-8223-2792-9
- Lan, Charles-Romain (1883), "Discours prononcés aux funerailles de M. L. Gruner", Annales des Mines (in French), 8.III
- Recyclage & Valorisation (in French), SIM: Société de l'industrie minérale
- "Société de l'Industrie Minérale", Annales des Mines (in French)
