= Edmond Huet =

Edmond Huet (French: [ɛdmɔ̃ ɥɛ]; 1827–1906) was a director of the Paris city council's works department at the end of the 19th century. A graduate of École polytechnique, he proposed several schemes for the introduction of a mass rapid transit system for the city and eventually worked closely with Fulgence Bienvenüe on the scheme to build the Paris Metro, which opened in 1900.

Huet became the eleventh president (after Henry Louis Le Châtelier) of the Société d'encouragement pour l'industrie nationale in 1905 and was succeeded by Édouard Gruner in 1907.

== See also ==
History of Paris Métro
