= Erich Spitz =

French engineer and physicist

- Born: 27 March 1931 (age 94); Brno, Czechoslovakia
- Occupations: Engineer; physicist
- Known for: Research and inventions in electromagnetic radiation, optical fibres, optical information storage and display technologies

Erich Spitz (born 27 March 1931) is a French engineer and physicist of Moravian German ethnicity.

"He is the author of a large number of publications and patents in the fields of electromagnetic radiation, optical fibres, optical information storage and processing, and liquid crystal display, and has made a major contribution to the progress of electronic science and industry. »

- French Academy of Sciences (France).

== Biography ==
Erich Spitz was born in Brno, Czechoslovakia on 27 March 1931. Married in 1963, he has three children.

After studying at the Sokolská Gymnasium in Brno, he joined the Faculty of Electrical Engineering of the Technical University of Prague, from which he graduated in 1954 as an engineer from the Prague Polytechnic. He was awarded a Doctor of Science degree in 1955.

== Professional career ==
After a year (1957-1958) spent at the Meudon Observatory as a researcher in radio astronomy, Erich Spitz joined the Compagnie générale de la télégraphie sans fil (CSF), which merged in 1968 with the French company Thomson-Houston (CFTH), a subsidiary of Thomson-Brandt to create the Thomson-CSF group, which in 2000 was renamed Thales.

From 1958 to 1968, Erich Spitz was a researcher in the Applied Physics Department of the new Corbeville Research Centre that the CSF had just created in 1957 near the Commissariat à l'Energie Atomique (CEA) in Saclay, notably under the impetus of Jean Robieux. Head of the laboratory from 1968, he took over the management of the research centre, which was named "Laboratoire Central de Recherche" (LCR) in 1975.

In 1983, he was appointed "Technical and Research Director" of the Thomson Group, succeeding Pierre Aigrain, then in 1986 "Deputy Managing Director in charge of research and technology". In 1988, he created the "Scientific and Technical College" bringing together the best experts from Thomson-CSF. Since 1995, he has been "Advisor to the Chairman ".

In addition, from 2001 to 2009, Erich Spitz was chairman and chief executive officer of Thales Avionics LCD SA, a subsidiary of Thales Avionics S.A.

Now retired, Erich Spitz is quite active as a Business Angel in the Paris Business Angel club. He invested, amongst other in the startup Cypheme.

== Scientific work ==
The main scientific work of Erich Spitz, which has led to numerous patent applications, is related to:

- inventions of new antennas for radio communications, in particular for space applications;
- high-capacity telecommunications using laser light in optical fibres. On this subject, Erich Spitz studied with Jean-Claude Simon in the CSF laboratory as early as 1963, the guided propagation of a coherent optical wave6.
- first optical disks for recording audio and video information;
- new methods of information processing using laser light,
- liquid crystal flat screens.

== Publications and books ==
=== Publications ===
Some of Erich Spitz's major publications:

- Progressive coupling and its application to antennas, Annals of Radio Electricity, T. XVI, No. 65, 1961
- A class of new type of Broad-band Antennas In Electromagnetic Waves, pp. 1139–1148, Ed. Pergamon Press New York, 1963.
- Holographic Reconstruction of Objects through a Moving Diffusing Medium, Proceedings of the French Academy of sciences, Paris, T.264, 1967
- (en) Videodisc optical design suitable for the consumer market, Ed. IEEE Trans.Broadcast Telev. Receivers, BTR 20 (332), 1974
- (en) Early Experiments on Optical Disc Storage, IEEE Journal on Selected Topics in Quantum Electronics, vol.6 no.6, pp. 1413–1418, 2000
- L'arrivée des fibres et l'évolution des lasers: de la CSF à Thomson-CSF, Revue de l'électricité et de l'électronique, no 1, année 2012, pp. 41–44

=== Books ===
- New Directions in Guided Waves and Coherent Optics, Martinus Nijhof Publisher, 1984

=== Report of the "Sustainability of Digital Media" group ===
On behalf of the Academy of Sciences and the Academy of Technology, Erich Spitz chaired the working group "Sustainability of Digital Media" whose report was published in March 2010.

- Erich Spitz, Jean-Charles Hourcade and Franck Laloë, Longevity of digital information: will the data we want to keep fade away: report of the PSN (perennité des supports numériques) group common to the Académie des sciences and the Académie des technologies, Les Ulis, EDP sciences, 2010 (ISBN 978-2-759-80509-9, OCLC 1003913853)

== Recognition ==
=== Academic environment ===
Erich Spitz is:

- member of the National Committee for Scientific Research (1975-1982)
- member of the French Academy of sciences, elected correspondant on 20 June 1983, in the Physics Section
- member of the Higher Council for Research and Technology (1983-1985)
- Founding member of the French Academy of Technologies, since 2000. Erich Spitz is a member of the Information and Communication Technologies (ICT) Commission.
- Member of the Royal Swedish Academy of Sciences, since 1994
- member of the Swiss Academy of Engineering Sciences
- President of the European Industrial Research Administration Association (EIRMA) (1991-1993)
- Fellow Member of the Institute of Electrical and Electronics Engineers (IEEE)
- Recipient in 1971 of the Blondel Medal awarded by the Société de l'électricité, de l'électronique et des technologies de l'information et de la communication (Electricity, Electronics and Information and Communication Technologies Society);
- Doctor honoris causa of the Prague Polytechnic
- Doctor honoris causa of the Swiss Federal Institute of Technology in Lausanne

=== Awards ===
Erich Spitz is an Officier of the Ordre National de la Légion d'Honneur and an Officier of the Ordre National du Mérite.
