= Valery Tereshchenko (academic) =

Valery Ivanovich Tereshchenko
- Russian: Валерий Иванович Терещенко; Ukrainian: Валерій Іванович Терещенко
- Born: 13 June 1901; Ekaterinodar, Imperial Russia
- Died: 28 September 1994 (aged 93); Kyiv, Ukraine
- Occupations: Economist, academic

Valery Ivanovich Tereshchenko (also V. J. Tereshtenko) (Russian: Валерий Иванович Терещенко; Ukrainian: Валерій Іванович Терещенко; 13 June 1901 – 28 September 1994) was a Russian, Soviet and Ukrainian academic specialising in the field of management.

== Early life and education ==
Valery Tereshchenko was born in the city of Ekaterinodar (now Krasnodar), in the family of a deputy district judge. He completed high school and conservatory studies in his hometown, and after the outbreak of the Russian Civil War was mobilised into the ranks of the Whites. Following their defeat by the Bolsheviks, Tereshchenko emigrated to Prague, where he graduated from the Department of Economics of the Czech Technical University and from the Russian Institute for Agricultural Cooperation, teaching at the latter in the late 1920s. In 1930, he moved to the United States, where he graduated from Columbia University in New York.

== Career ==
In the United States, Tereshchenko worked in the U.S. Department of Agriculture, at a Wall Street firm, as a counsellor of the American businessman Roswell Garst, and teaching management courses at Columbia.

In 1937, sponsored by the U.S. Department of Labor, Tereshchenko organized and led a large, 160-employee research project to study the world's literature on cooperatives, which was published 12 languages. The work was conducted in close collaboration with the Co-operative League of America, the International Cooperative Alliance in London, the International Labour Office in Geneva, and the Rockefeller Committee for Relations with South America. The Library of Congress assessed the materials collected by project as "the most complete in the world" at that time. The Fundamental Project Edition, Summaries of laws on cooperatives in the U.S., was used to revise the cooperative laws in some states. In April 1940, Tereshchenko was invited to Committee of the Senate on cooperatives legislation. He and other project employees later took part in the establishment of initial economic ties between the U.S. and the Republic of China (1942−1949).

In the 1940s, Tereshchenko was also invited to organize a section on cooperatives at the Latin American Institute in Boston and was initiator of the first ever visit delegation of cooperators from South America to the United States. Before the end of World War II, he was elected to the Executive Committee of the International Cooperative postwar reconstruction in New York. He participated in the preparation the United Nations Conferences on Food and Agriculture in Atlantic City and Hot Springs.

After the war, Tereshchenko travelled to the USSR for business trips and to help establish trade and economic ties with the U.S. In 1946, he was chief economist of the United Nations Relief and Rehabilitation Administration (UNRRA) in Soviet Ukraine. He eventually returned permanently to the Soviet Union, living in Kyiv from 1963 onwards. He worked in a number of research institutes in the Ministry of Agricultural Economics and at the Academy of Sciences of the Ukrainian SSR, and taught at the Taras Shevchenko National University of Kyiv.

Tereshchenko authored over 170 books, papers, and articles in periodical on the management problems, which were printed in more than 10 countries. In 1970, a Moscovian company published a reduced version of the multi-volume Executive Leadership Course (Englewood Cliffs, N.J.: Prentice-Hall, Inc., 1963), which was edited by Tereshchenko.

He was a lecturer, with thousands of public lectures given in the U.S., Europe, and the Soviet Union. His later works included The choice problem: policy of research priorities in the West, The science of management, and All about cooperation, which was written when he was almost 90 years of age and published in Kyiv.

== Personal life and honours ==
Tereshchenko died September 28, 1994. His remains are buried in Kyiv, at the Baikove Cemetery.

He was given an honorary award by UNESCO, and awarded an honorary diploma by the Missouri Writers Guild in the U.S.

== Selected works ==
- The problem of cooperative medicine - New York City: Works Progress Administration, 1940
- Cooperative Education – New York City: Bureau of Labor Statistics, 1941
- Bibliographical review of literature on legal phases of cooperation - New York City: Bureau of Labor Statistics, 1941
- Bibliographical review of literature on cooperation in Latin America - New York City: Work Projects Administration, 1942
- American-Soviet Trade Relations: Past and Future - New York City, 1945 (with V. P. Timoshenko.)
- Industrial cooperative in the Post-War Ukraine in The American Slavic and East European Review (1951), vol. 1, pages 26-37.
- Industrial cooperatives in the Ukrainian S.S.R. in Annals of Collective Economy (1951), vol. 2, pages 205-212.

== See also ==
- Management consultant
- Soviet academics
- Tereshchenko family
