= Pierre-Paul Guieysse =

French politician (1841–1914)

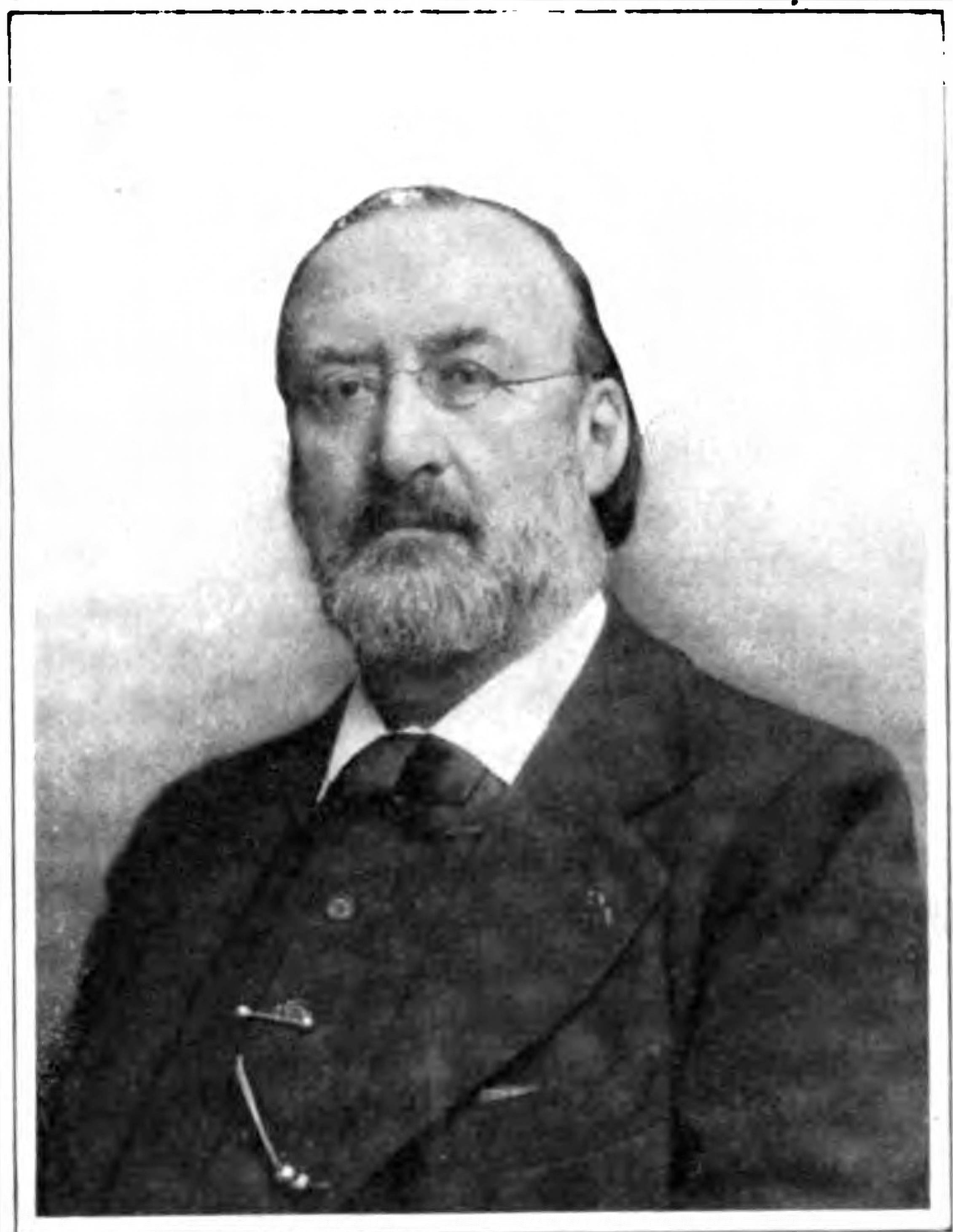
- Born: May 11, 1841; Lorient
- Died: May 19, 1914 (aged 73); Paris
- Occupation: Politician

Pierre-Paul Guieysse, (May 11, 1841 – May 19, 1914) was a French Socialist politician. He was Minister of the Colonies in the French Cabinet headed by Léon Bourgeois between 1895 and 1896.

== Life ==
He was born in Lorient, Brittany, of a Protestant family. He trained as a hydrographic engineer, working for the navy, but developed scholarly and political interests, becoming a specialist in Egyptology and being active in leftist politics. In May 1900 he co-founded the newspaper La Dépêche de Lorient.

Guieyesse was elected to the Chamber of Deputies as a Radical and Republican Deputy for Morbihan between 1890 and 1910. He was active in the debate over the 1905 French law on the Separation of the Churches and the State, to which he proposed an amendment. He was also active in the promotion of legislation to make pension contributions compulsory.

Guieysse was active in the social Protestant movement, as were other Musée social members such as Charles Gide (1847–1932), Édouard Gruner (1849–1933), Henri Monod (1843–1911) and Jules Siegfried (1837–1922). Guiyesse was also president of the Bleus de Bretagne (Breton Blues) a society of liberal and anticlerical Bretons. He played the dominant role in organizing the erection of the controversial statue of Ernest Renan in Tréguier.

From November 1895 to April 1896 he was Minister of Colonies in the Bourgeois government.

Marcel Guieysse, one of his sons, became a militant Breton nationalist and collaborator during World War II.

== Political career ==
=== Local politics ===
- General Counsel of Morbihan from 1881 to 1889

=== National Deputy for Morbihan ===
- Morbihan: February 9, 1890 - October 14, 1893
- Morbihan: August 20, 1893 - May 31, 1898
- Morbihan: May 8, 1898 - May 31, 1902
- Morbihan: 11 May 1902 - May 31, 1906
- Morbihan: May 20, 1906 - May 31, 1910

== Sources ==
- Horne, Janet R. (2002-01-11), A Social Laboratory for Modern France: The Musée Social and the Rise of the Welfare State, Duke University Press, ISBN 0-8223-2792-9
