= Fulgence Bienvenüe =

French civil engineer (1852–1936)

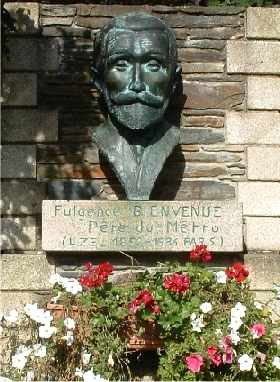
- Born: 27 January 1852; Uzel, France
- Died: 3 August 1936 (aged 84); Paris, France
- Education: Lycée Sainte-Geneviève; École Polytechnique; École nationale des ponts et chaussées
- Occupation: Engineer
- Known for: Father of the Paris Métro

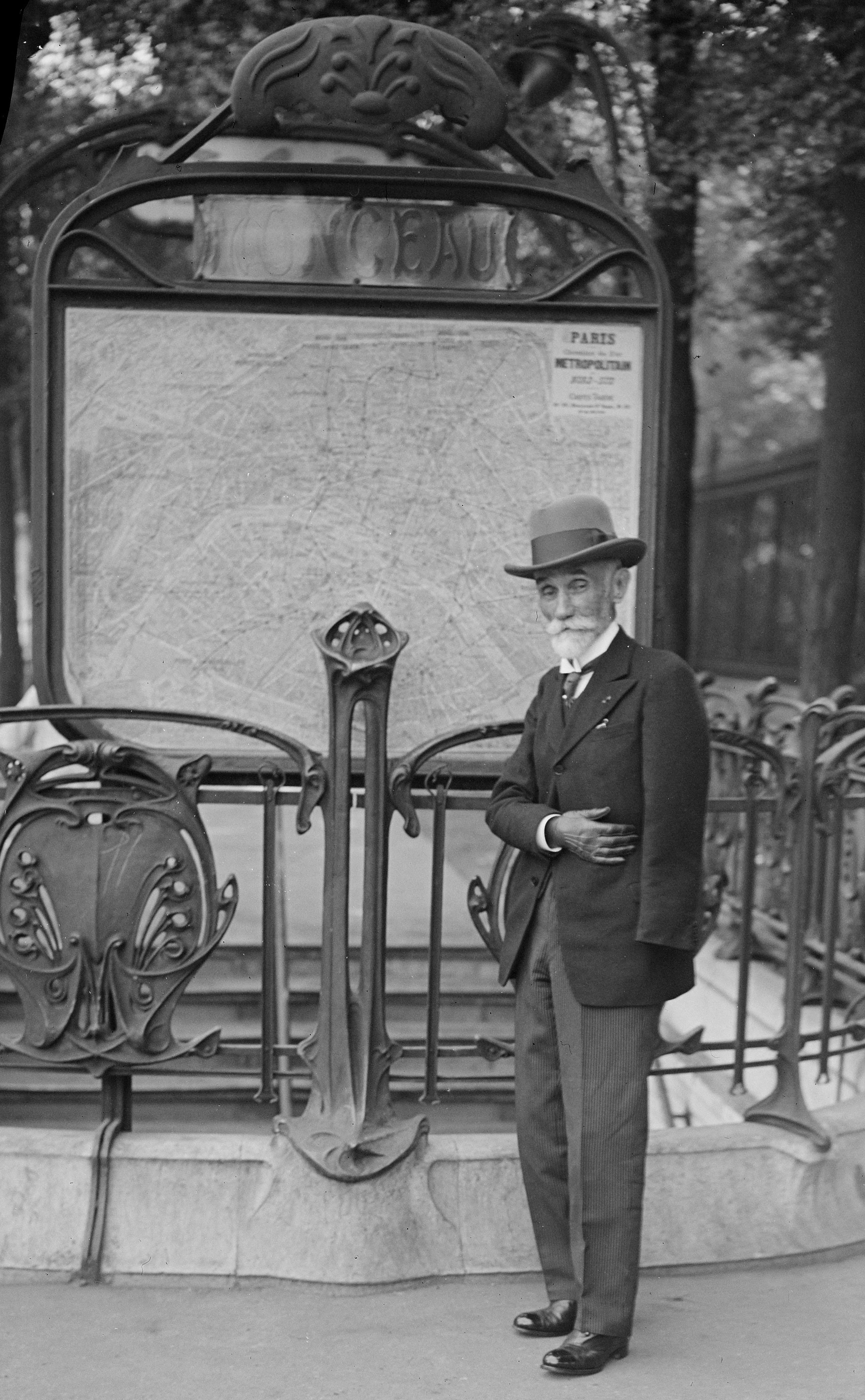
Bienvenüe standing at the entrance to Monceau station

Fulgence Bienvenüe (French pronunciation: [fylʒɑ̃s bjɛ̃v(ə)ny]; 27 January 1852 – 3 August 1936) was a French civil engineer, best known for his role in the construction of the Paris Métro, and has been called "Le Père du Métro" (Father of the Metro).

A native of Uzel in Brittany, and the son of a notary, in 1872 Bienvenüe graduated from the École Polytechnique as a civil engineer and the same year he began working for the Department of Bridges and Roads at Alençon. His first assignment was the construction of new railway lines in the Mayenne area, in the course of which his left arm had to be amputated after being crushed in a construction accident. In the early 1880s he oversaw construction or operations on the Northern and Eastern Railways.

After his railway work, Bienvenüe sought a position in Paris, where over the next ten years he acquired the experience and contacts which proved useful in his career with the metro. In 1886, he was named head of public works for the city’s 19th and 20th districts. Semi-rural areas when annexed to Paris in 1860, Bienvenüe’s districts were gradually acquiring urban infrastructure. His office handled project identification and construction of streets, sewers, lighting, public facilities, and streetscapes, and maintained the Parc des Buttes Chaumont. He selected the technology, secured approvals, and oversaw the construction of the Funicular de Belleville, a cable car system fitted into a narrow and curving thoroughfare, that provided transit to a growing neighborhood sited on an elevation too steep for omnibuses. In 1891 Bienvenue was named the city’s Chief Engineer and was tasked with addressing Paris’ always-increasing need for drinking water. He oversaw the construction of the Avre Aqueduct and the study for diverting the sources of the Loing and Lunain rivers.

Paris city officials selected Bienvenüe to become chief engineer for the Paris Métro in 1896. He designed a special way of building new tunnels which allowed the swift repaving of the roads above; this involved (among other things) building the crown of the tunnel first and the floor last, the reverse of the usual method at that time. Bienvenüe has the credit for the mostly swift and relatively uneventful construction of the Métro through the difficult and heterogeneous Parisian soils and rocks. He came up with the idea of freezing wet and unstable soil in order to permit the drilling of tunnels. He was to supervise the Paris Metro construction for more than three decades, finally retiring on 6 December 1932.

Bienvenüe's construction of the Métro was widely praised and has been described admiringly as a work "worthy of the Romans". He eventually accumulated many honors for his engineering accomplishments, including the Grand Prix Berger of the Academy of Arts and Sciences (1909) and the Grand Cross of the Legion of Honor (1929).

On 30 June 1933, the Avenue du Maine station on the Metro was renamed Bienvenüe in his honor. The naming ceremony took place in his presence; there was a last-minute scramble to repaint the station's new nameboards when it was discovered that the unusual diaeresis in his name had been omitted, making it the French word for "welcome". In 1942 the station was linked to the adjacent Montparnasse station, forming a single station named Montparnasse-Bienvenüe.

Bienvenüe was buried in 1936 at the Père Lachaise Cemetery, Paris.

Lycée Fulgence Bienvenüe high school in Loudéac, Brittany is named after Bienvenüe.

== See also ==
- Edmond Huet
