= Edmund Gordon =

American psychologist and educator (born 1921)

- Born: Edmund Wyatt Gordon; June 13, 1921 (age 104); Goldsboro, North Carolina, U.S.
- Education: Howard University (BS, BD); American University (MA); Columbia University (EdD)
- Notable work: The Achievement Gap
- Spouse: Susan Gitt Gordon (m. 1948; died 2016)
- Children: 4
- Relatives: Jessica Gordon Nembhard (daughter)
- Awards: American Educational Research Association Relating Research to Practice Award (2010)
- Scientific career
- Fields: Educational psychology Development psychology
- Institutions: List: Howard University American University Teachers College, Columbia University Long Island University Albert Einstein College of Medicine Yeshiva University Harvard University Yale University University of Pittsburgh City University of New York Mount Holyoke College Bank Street College Brown University City University of New York Rockland Community College
- Thesis: Toward meeting the mental health needs of underprivileged minority group children in the Harlem community of New York City (1958)
- Notable students: Ana Mari Cauce

Edmund Wyatt Gordon (born June 13, 1921) is an American psychologist and professor. Gordon was recognized as a preeminent scholar of African-American studies when he was awarded the 2011 John Hope Franklin Award from Diverse Issues in Higher Education magazine at the 93rd Annual Meeting of the American Council on Education.

He cites Herbert G. Birch, W. E. B. Du Bois, and Alain LeRoy Locke as major influencers.

== Background ==
Gordon was born in 1921 in the segregated town of Goldsboro, North Carolina. His father emigrated from Jamaica and began to practice medicine when he married Gordon's mother, an elementary school teacher. While the town was heavily segregated and African Americans weren't allowed to shop alongside white Americans, the Gordon family was allowed to shop in a department store on Wednesday afternoons because of the strong reputation of Gordon's father.

Gordon's scholarship has focused on the development of students who were African-American, ethnic minorities, and of low socioeconomic status who triumphed over significant odds to become better achievers. He is widely known for his research on diverse human characteristics and pedagogy. His research includes the advancement of the concepts of "the Achievement Gap", "Affirmative development of academic ability", and "Supplementary Education", all which focus on improving the quality of academic achievement in diverse learners. His publications consist of more than 200 articles and 18 books and monographs.

In a New York Times article about Gordon's personal life and professional contributions, Gordon cites Alain LeRoy Locke, Herbert G. Birch, and W. E. B. Du Bois as the mentors that influenced him throughout his studies. Gordon was struggling to succeed at Howard University when Locke helped to encourage him and keep him on track. Gordon has stated that Locke set him on the course of serious scholarship. Next, he discussed his interaction with Birch, a research psychologist at City College. Birch encouraged Gordon to go to the library and read. Finally, Gordon describes his mentorship with W. E. B. Du Bois, a world-renowned author, activist, and co-founder of the NAACP. Du Bois suggested that Gordon study the percentage of minority students that succeed despite serious challenges.

== Professional life ==
Edmund Gordon was working at Stanford University with colleagues who were involved in John F. Kennedy's beginnings of social change. Soon afterwards, Kennedy was assassinated and Lyndon Johnson became president. Gordon was given the job of evaluating the Head Start program. He stated that getting this job had as much to do with his doctoral studies as it did affirmative action. Gordon has stated that, while he believes Head Start has been a success from a government standpoint, the program could have been much more than it is today. He and his colleagues viewed the project as not only a child development project, but also a project to influence and improve the lives of families and communities. The latter part of Gordon's dreams for Head Start have not come about, but he still believes the overall program has been a success.

Gordon received his bachelor's degree in Zoology and Social Ethics in Divinity from Howard University, a Master of Arts degree in Social Psychology from American University, and the Doctor of Education degree in child development and guidance from Teachers College, Columbia University. He was also awarded the Masters of Arts degree (honorary) from Yale University and the Doctor of Humane Letters degree (honorary) from Yeshiva University and Brown University.

From July 2000 until August 2001, Gordon was Vice President of Academic Affairs and Interim Dean at Teachers College, Columbia University. He is the John M. Musser Professor of Psychology Emeritus at Yale University, the Richard March Hoe Professor at Teachers College, Columbia University, and founding director of the Institute for Urban and Minority Education and the Institute for Research on African Diaspora in the Americas and Caribbean (IRADAC) at the City College of New York. In 2006, Gordon was appointed Senior Scholar in Residence at SUNY Rockland Community College, an appointment that was renewed in 2010. In 2003, Educational Testing Service endowed a chair in Gordon's honor.

Gordon was elected member of the National Academy of Education in 1968. In 2005, Columbia University named its campus in Harlem, NY, the Edmund W. Gordon Campus of Teachers College, Columbia University.

On June 28, 2010, Gordon was the recipient of the 2010 American Educational Research Association (AERA) "Relating Research to Practice Award".

THe served as chairperson of the Gordon Commission with Educational Testing Service from 2011 through the publication of its reports in 2013.

On December 15, 2014, The Board of Regents of the University of Texas System approved the honorific naming of the newly renovated and expanded Geography Building as the Susan G. and Edmund W. Gordon & Charles W. and Frances B. White Building, now referred to as the Gordon-White Building.

In 2017, he was elected a Fellow of the American Academy of Arts and Sciences.

In 2019, Gordon hosted the Human Variance and Assessment for Learning: Implications for Diverse Learners of STEM national conference at Teachers College, Columbia University, convening scholars, policymakers, school principals, and students together to discuss selected models of measurement for the implementation of new ways of generating and utilizing data from assessments.

Archives have been established to catalogue Gordon's publishing and community engagement at the Schomburg Center for Research in Black Culture in 1990 and at the University of Texas at Austin in 2018.

In April 2021, Gordon was named Honorary President of the American Educational Research Association (AERA), the first person to receive this recognition in the organization's history.

On May 6, 2024, Rockland Community College board passed a motion 6-0 to renamed the Ellipse as Dr. Edmund W. Gordon Room

== Personal life ==
Gordon purchased the homesite of W. E. B. Du Bois's childhood house in 1967. It was turned into a landmark in 1987 when the Du Bois foundation handed it over to the Commonwealth of Massachusetts. University of Massachusetts Amherst was designated as custodian.

Gordon was married to Susan Gitt, a pediatrician, from 1948 until her death in 2016. Together they had four children (including Jessica Gordon Nembhard), nine grandchildren and nine great-grandchildren. In 2000, they co-founded The CEJJES Institute in Pomona, New York, on route NY 45 in Rockland County, New York, to serve the African diaspora.

Gordon turned 100 in 2021.
