= Société d'encouragement pour l'industrie nationale =

Organisation supporting French industries

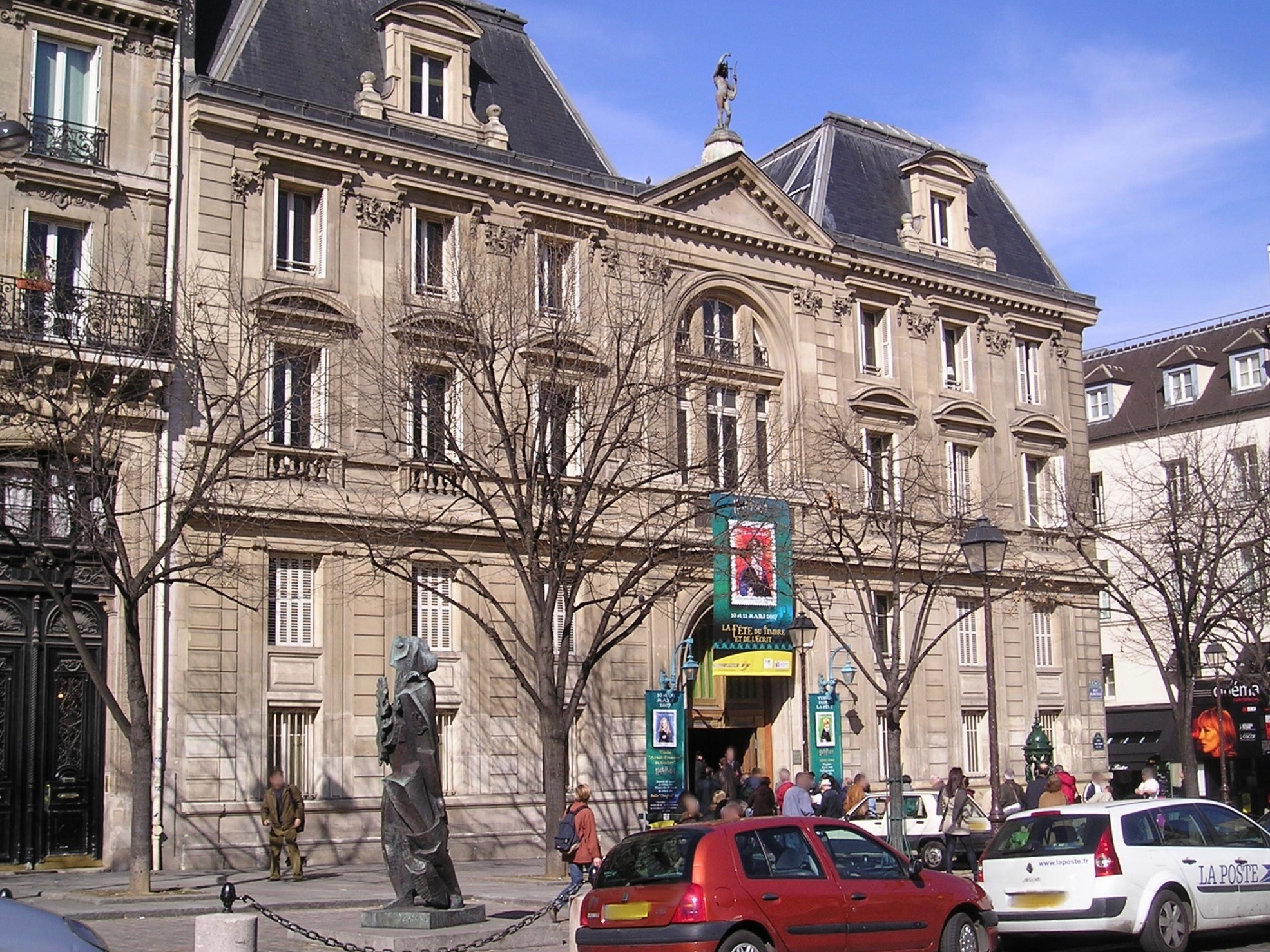
- Hôtel de l'Industrie in Paris, place Saint-Germain-des-Prés, seat of the society

- Société d'encouragement pour l'industrie nationale (Paris)
- Abbreviation: SEIN
- Formation: 1801
- Founded at: Paris
- Legal status: active
- Headquarters: 4 Place Saint-Germain des Prés, 75006 Paris, France
- Coordinates: 48.854509°N 2.333259°E
- Website: www.industrienationale.fr

The Société d'encouragement pour l'industrie nationale (French pronunciation: [sɔsjete dɑ̃kuʁaʒmɑ̃ puʁ lɛ̃dystʁi nɑsjɔnal]; transl. Society for the Development of National Industry) is an organization established in 1801 to support French industry. Over the years it has provided prizes and support to inventors, promoted transfer of technology and management techniques, sponsored efforts to improve safety and efficiency and reduce pollution, and promoted vocational education.

== Foundation ==
In 1800 Napoleon was firmly in power as ruler of France and continental peace seemed assured. Napoleon resolved to make French industry greater than that of all other nations, particularly England. At the initiative of the Minister of Interior Jean-Antoine Chaptal, the second Exposition des produits de l'industrie française was held in Paris from 19 to 25 September 1801. Following this, a preparatory meeting for the Société d'encouragement pour l'industrie nationale was held on 4 October 1801 to discuss the formation of a society similar to the British Royal Society of Arts to encourage and improve French industry.

A month later, the opening meeting chaired by David Etienne Rouille de L'Etang (1731–1811) was held on 31 October 1801, with 92 attendees including the three Consuls. Within a few weeks there were over 900 subscribers, including Napoleon Bonaparte with 100 subscriptions, Chaptal with 50 subscriptions, and many others with multiple subscriptions.

== History ==
The third Exposition des produits de l'industrie française was held in 1802 and lasted seven days, with 540 exhibitors. After this the government decided that more time was needed between the expositions to allow for advances in manufacturing to mature, and put off the next exposition until 1806. In the interim the Société d'encouragement pour l'industrie nationale continued to give prizes for many branches of industry. The society received considerable subsidies from Chaptal's ministry, which distributed its bulletin.

Between 1801 and 1845 the emphasis of the society was on stimulation of inventions, transfer of technology and improvements to business processes. Hundred of inventors and researchers received support, as did various companies. The society sponsored transfer of technology from foreign industrial companies, supported the expositions universelles and arranged for foundation of Arts & Crafts schools and the École centrale des arts et manufactures.

Between 1846 and 1885 the society undertook many initiatives to counter the negative effects of industrialization, such as protection of children working in factories, workplace hygiene and safety, reduction of pollution and unemployment funds. The society continued to fund researchers, supported creation of regional industry societies and supported foundation of the École Libre des Sciences Politiques. From 1886 to 1954 the emphasis was on encouraging industrial research, including energy saving and the fight against pollution, standardization, scientific management (Taylorism) and industrial design. Édouard Gruner (1849–1933) was president of the Société d'encouragement pour l'industrie nationale from 1907 to 1909. He was also president of the Houillères de la Haute-Loire, Aciéries de Paris et d'Outreau and the Société de l'industrie minérale, and was an advocate at the Musée social for these employer interests groups.

From 1930 the society sponsored conferences on advances in science and technology. From 1955 to 1993 the society encouraged teachers and researchers, research institutions and laboratories. From 1994 the society tried to improve the status of the entrepreneur, support emerging talent, provide logistical support to emerging industries, and support vocational training.

== Presidents ==
Presidents of the society have been:

- Jean-Antoine Chaptal (1801–32)
- Louis Jacques Thénard (1832–45)
- Jean-Baptiste Dumas (1845–64)
- Edmond Becquerel (1864–88)
- Julien Haton de La Goupillière^{(fr)} (1888–91)
- Louis-Eugéne Tisserand (1891–94)
- Éleuthère Mascart (1894–97)
- Marie-Adolphe Carnot (1897–1900)
- Oscar Linder (1900–03)
- Henry Louis Le Châtelier (1903–05)
- Edmond Huet (1906–07)
- Édouard Gruner (1907–09)
- Louis-Émile Bertin (1909–12)
- Léon Lindet (1912–20)
- Louis Baclé (1920–23)
- Augustin Mesnager^{(fr)} (1923–26)
- Édouard Sauvage (1926–29)
- Louis Mangin (1930–32)
- Amédée Alby^{(fr)} (1932–35)
- Maurice Lacoin (1935–38)
- Marcel Magne^{(fr)} (1938–44)
- Robert Lelong (1944–45)
- Louis Pineau (1945–50)
- Albert Caquot (1951–54)
- Georges Jean Marie Darrieus (1954–57)
- Georges Chaudron (1957–61)
- Jean Lecomte (1961–68)
- Jacques Tréfouël (1968–73)
- Henri Normant (1973–78)
- Jean Buré (1978–86)
- Jean Robieux (1986–91)
- Paul Lacombe (1991–94)
- Bernard Mousson (1994–2011)
- Olivier Mousson (from 2011)

== Sources ==
- Chandler, Arthur, The Napoleonic Expositions
- Colmont, Achille de (1855), Histoire des Expositions des produits de l'Industrie Française (in French), Guillaumin
- Douyere-Demeulenaere, Christiane (2005), "Expositions publiques des produits de l'industrie française avant 1850" (PDF), archivesnationales.culture.gouv.fr (in French)
- Histoire (in French), Société d'encouragement pour l'industrie nationale
- Horn, Jeff (2006), The Path Not Taken: French Industrialization in the Age of Revolution, 1750-1830, MIT Press, ISBN 978-0-262-26312-2
- Horne, Janet R. (2002-01-11), A Social Laboratory for Modern France: The Musée Social and the Rise of the Welfare State, Duke University Press, ISBN 0-8223-2792-9
