= Édouard Gruner =

French civil engineer (1849-1933)

- Born: 16 June 1849; Poitiers, France
- Died: 21 July 1933 (aged 84); Breux-Jouy, Essonne, France
- Occupation: Civil engineer

Édouard Emmanuel Gruner (16 June 1849 – 21 July 1933) was a French civil engineer and industrialist. He trained as a mining engineer, and soon became a senior administrator or president of various steel and mining enterprises. He headed the central committee of coal mining companies from 1907, and was first president of the Protestant Federation of France. He was active in the social Protestant movement, believing that employers had responsibility for the welfare of workers, and should not just delegate this to the state.

== Family ==
Édouard Emmanuel Gruner was born in Poitiers, Vienne, on 16 January 1849. He was from an old Protestant bourgeois family from Bern. He was the only son of Emmanuel-Louis Gruner (1809–83) and Emma Milson. His father was a civil engineer who was assistant director of the École des mines and vice president of the Conseil des mines. He attended the École Polytechnique from 1869. As a sub-lieutenant of artillery, he defended Paris in 1871 during the Franco-Prussian War. He entered the École des Mines in November 1871, and graduated in 1873. He wrote on iron metallurgy after an internship in Styria-Carinthia. He married Mathilde Engelbach (d. 1923). They had two sons, Henri and Louis.

== Career ==
Through family connections Gruner was appointed assistant director of the Compagnie Châtillon-Commentry plant at Châtillon-sur-Seine in 1874, and then in 1876 director of a factory at Neuves-Maisons. He directed the Cie Châtillon-Commentry plant at Beaucaire, Bouches-du-Rhone from 1879 to 1885. He was made a consulting engineer with De Dietrich, undertaking missions in Germany, Austrie, Russia, Spain and Algeria.

At the start of 1887 there were discussions on setting up a permanent mining employers' committee, with Gruner as secretary. He spent several months in Germany that year studying how employers' organization worked there. In 1889 Gruner was named secretary general of the Comité central des houillères, a newly formed interest group of coal mining companies. Also in 1889 Gruner founded the Comité permanent du Congrès des accidents du travail at the 1889 Universal Exhibition. This group promoted regulation of accident insurance at an industry level and included Oscar Linder (1829–1917), Maurice Bellom (1865–1919), Léon Say (1826–96) and Jules Simon (1814–96). It was one of the earliest precursors of the Musée social.

Gruner was an active member of the Société d'économie sociale. He became a member of the board of directors of the Musée social in November 1894 and presided over research sections at the Musée on social insurance and on employer-sponsored social welfare. He was president of the Houillères de la Haute-Loire, the Aciéries de Paris et d'Outreau, the Société de l'industrie minérale and the Société d'encouragement pour l'industrie nationale, and was an advocate at the Musée social for these employer interests groups. When the Musée officially opened in March 1895 Gruner was secretary-treasurer.

Gruner was active in the social Protestant movement, as were other Musée members such as Jules Siegfried (1837–1922), Charles Gide (1847–1932), Henri Monod (1843–1911) and Pierre-Paul Guieysse (1841–1914). As a leader of the Protestant industrial community he urged its leaders to organize themselves rather than wait for the government to impose regulations on their operations. In Nïmes in 1891 he lectured on "The Responsibility for Accidents from a Christian Point of View", speaking as a president of the Fédération protestante and of the Société des missions évangéliques. He argued that to letting the state organize accident insurance was to shirk a sacred social duty. Further, it would weaken the bond between employers and worker, and would thus promote socialism. He joined the International Association for Labour Legislation, a precursor of the International Labour Organization founded during the 1900 Universal Exhibition to promote unified international labour legislation. From 1905 to 1927 he was President of the Protestant Federation of France, and from 1917 to 1933 he was President of the Society of Evangelical Missions.

Gruner introduced Robert Pinot (1862–1926) to the metallurgy manufacturers who were looking for a leader for their trade association, and did the same for Paul de Rousiers (1857–1934) by putting him in contact with the shipbuilders, who wanted to found a professional association. In 1905 Gruner was appointed general administrator of the Kryvyi Rih iron ore company in Russia. He was succeeded as secretary general of the Comité central des houillères in 1906 by Henri de Peyerimhoff. In 1907 he became President of the Comité Central des Houillères.

At the start of World War I (1914–18) Gruner returned to the army and organized the batteries of Vincennes, directed an ammunition service then inspected in Russia (1914–16). After the war he was appointed a member of the Office for the Recovery of Invaded Regions. He was president of the Aciéries de Paris et d'Outreau, the Houillères de Haute-Loire and then of the Houillères de France (1931). He was president of the general commission of the École des mines and of various other societies associated with the mining industry. He was appointed a Knight of the Legion of Honor in (1896), then an officer in 1901. Édouard Gruner died in Rimoron, a commune of Breux-Jouy, Essonne, on 21 July 1933.

== Publications ==
- Les Associations et syndicats miniers en Allemagne et principalement en Westphalie, Paris, Chaix, 1887, 81 p.
- L'Assurance contre la vieillesse et l'invalidité en Allemagne, d'après l'avant-projet du gouvernement, Paris, L. Warnier, 1888, 62 p.

== Sources ==
- Bernard Hours, "Gruner, Edouard", Patrons de France (in French), Laboratoire de Recherche Historique Rhône-Alpes
- "Édouard Emmanuel GRUNER (1849-1933)", Annales des Mines (in French)
- Gillet, Marcel (1984), "The Coal Age", Histoire sociale du Nord et de l'Europe du Nord-Ouest: Recherches sur les 19e et 20e siècles, Presses Univ. Septentrion, ISBN 978-2-86531-020-3
- Horne, Janet R. (2002-01-11), A Social Laboratory for Modern France: The Musée Social and the Rise of the Welfare State, Duke University Press, ISBN 0-8223-2792-9
- Savoye, Antoine (1988), "Paul de Rousiers, sociologue et praticien du syndicalisme", Cahiers Georges Sorel (in French), 6 (1): 52–77, doi:10.3406/mcm.1988.959
