= Edgard Milhaud =

French socialist professor of economics

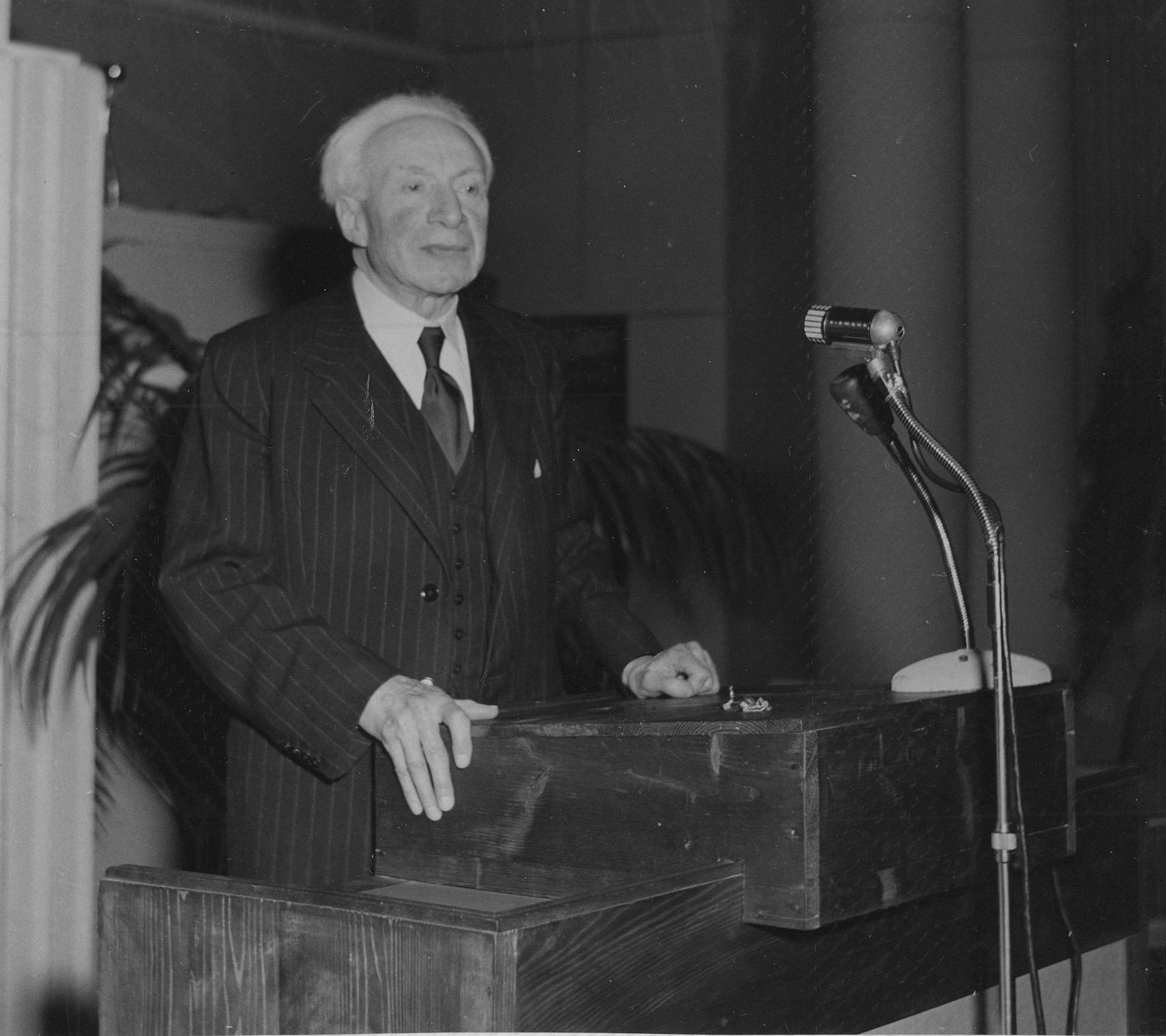
- Milhaud at the CIRIEC congress in Geneva, 1953.
- Born: 14 April 1873; Nîmes, Gard, France
- Died: 4 September 1964 (aged 91); Barcelona, Spain
- Occupation: Professor of economy

Edgard Milhaud (14 April 1873 – 4 September 1964) was a French professor of economics, a militant socialist, and a promoter and theoretician of social economy.

== Life ==
Isaac Edgard Milhaud was born on 14 April 1873 in Nîmes, Gard, France. His parents were Jassuda Léon Milhaud (1839–1901) and Marie Victoire dite Sarah Cerf (1850–1901). From 1892 to 1896, he studied in Pars at the Sorbonne, Collège de France and Faculté de Droit, studying philosophy, sociology, and political economy. He received his agrégation in philosophy in 1895. He studied in Germany in 1896–99, inquiring into the workers' movement the basis for his book La démocratie socialiste allemande (1902). He was an economist and a militant socialist.

From 1899 to 1902, Milhaud was an economic adviser in the office in the Minister of Commerce and Industry. He married Berthe Louise Marquinot (1880–1978) on 14 April 1901. Their children were Maurice Edgard, born in 1899, and Germaine Sarah, born in 1901. In 1902, he was appointed Professor of Political Economy at the University of Geneva. In 1908, he founded the journal Annales de la Regie directe, an international journal which in 1925 became the "Annales de l'Economie collective". (It is now named the Annals of Public and Cooperative Economics). He was Director and Editor-in-Chief. In 1914–18, he was the first doyen of the Faculty of Economic and Social Sciences.

In 1920, Milhaud was asked by the International Labour Organization (ILO) to direct the Survey of Production (1920–24). In the early 1920s, Albert Thomas and Edgard Milhaud proposed to develop expertise in the ILO on the links between social and economic problems. As the delegate representing the French employers at the ILO, Robert Pinot despised the proposal, which he called "social control of the economy." In 1923, Milhaud became a member of the Honorary Committee of the International Co-operative Alliance. In 1924 he was a member of the Higher Consultative Committee of Commerce and Industry of France.

From 1925 to 1933, Milhaud was Chief of the General Investigations Section of the ILO. In 1926, he gave a course at the Academy of International Law of The Hague. In 1926–29, he was President of the Belgian-Luxembourg Mixed Arbitral Tribunal, set up to decide economic questions arising from the Belgo-Luxemburg Economic Convention. He was called to this presidency by the Council of the League of Nations. From 1928 to 1936, he was a member of the National Economic Council of France. On 20 June 1940, Edgard Milhaud, Adrien Tixier and Jean-Amédée Weber sent a telegram to Marshal Petain in protest against the request for an armistice, asking for the continuation of the war alongside the British.

In 1947, while teaching at the University of Geneva, Milhaud founded the International Centre of Research and Information on the Collective Economy, now known as CIRIEC, to ensure continuity of the Annals of Collective Economy. In 1948, Milhaud was a candidate for the Nobel Peace Prize. In 1957, the headquarters of CIRIEC were moved to Liège, Belgium, and Professor Paul Lambert became director. Edgard Milhaud died on 4 September 1964 in Barcelona, Spain. In 2010, CIRIEC started to award the €5,000 Edgard Milhaud Prize annually to young doctoral students.

== Publications ==
- Edgard Milhaud (1899), Pour l'union socialiste, preface by Jean Jaurès, Bellais
- Edgard Milhaud (1899), Le Congrès socialiste de Stuttgart, préface by Jean Jaurès, Bellais
- Aristide Briand, René Viviani, Edgar Milhaud, Jean Jaurès (1902), L'action du parti socialiste au Parlement et dans le Pays, Marcel-Maugras
- Edgard Milhaud (1902), La Science économique : leçon d'ouverture du cours d'économie politique à l'Université de Genève, société nouvelle de librairie et d'édition
- Edgard Milhaud (1903), La démocratie socialiste allemande, F. Alcan
- Edgard Milhaud (1904), Le Rachat des chemins de fer, É. Cornély et Cie
- Edgard Milhaud (1905), La tactique socialiste et les décisions des congrès internationaux, vol. 1–2, Société nouvelle de Librairie et d'édition
- Edgard Milhaud (1912), L'économie publique : objet-méthode-programme de travail, Librairie des sciences politiques et sociales
- Edgard Milhaud (1915), Du droit de la force à la force du droit, Atar
- Edgard Milhaud (1917), La société des nations, Éditions Bernard Grasset
- Edgard Milhaud (1919), Plus jamais ! : L'organisation de la paix; le pacte de la Société des nations; les amendements nécessaires, Éditions G. Crés (Paris), Benteli (Berlin), Sonor (Geneva)
- Edgard Milhaud (1920), Les fermiers généraux du rail, Éditions Bernard Grasset
- Edgard Milhaud (1920), La marche au socialisme, Éditions Bernard Grasset
- Edgard Milhaud (1926), La Géorgie, la Russie et la S.D.N., imp. du Journal de Genève
- Edgard Milhaud (1927), La Journée de huit heures et ses résultats d'après l'enquête sur la production, preface by Albert Thomas, Société d'mpression d'Ambilly-Annemasse
- Edgard Milhaud (1932), Un projet d'action immédiate contre le chômage et contre la crise : création simultanée et conjointe d'emplois et de débouchés, Annales de l'économie collective
- Edgard Milhaud (1933), Trêve de l'or et clearing international : plan pour le rétablissement des échanges internationaux, Maison coopérative du livre
- Edgard Milhaud, U.V. Beckerath, Walter Zander; et al. (1934), Organisation des échanges et création de travail, Sirey
- Edgard Milhaud (1935), Pour établir les échanges : la compensation internationale intégrale, avec règlement par devises-compensation, Comité d'action pour la compensation internationale intégrale
- Edgard Milhaud (1935), Une idée en marche : la compensation organisée, Recueil Sirey
- Edgard Milhaud (1936), Le chèque-compensation international devant l'opinion, Recueil Sirey
- Edgard Milhaud (1938), Moyens de paiement de caractère compensatoire, A. Kundig
- Edgard Milhaud (1943), Le rôle et les tâches de la coopération dans l'économie de demain, U.S.C.
- Edgard Milhaud (1946), L'alternative de fer : paix totale ou guerre, Presses Universitaires de France (Paris), Éditions de la Baconnière (Bâle)
- Edgard Milhaud (1948), Sur la ligne de partage des temps, Presses Universitaires de France
- Edgard Milhaud (1949), Échanges européens et chèque-compensation, Éditions de la SGEI
- Edgard Milhaud (1950), Deux notions économiques de base : prestations et contre-prestations, Libr. M. Rivière
- Edgard Milhaud (1951), La Place de la coopération dans l'économie collective, preface by Marcel Brot, Fédération nationale des coopératives de consommation, Impr. l'Émancipatrice
- Edgard Milhaud (1924), Pour le rétablissement financier et monétaire : Une formule d'emprunt à garantie franc-or, Presses Universitaires de France
- Edgard Milhaud (1945), La France avait raison : sécurité collective, Éditions de la Baconnière
- Edgard Milhaud (1945), Plusieurs sièges des Nations-Unies : Londres - Moscou - Nankin - Paris - Washington - Genève, Éditions de la Baconnière
- Edgard Milhaud (1947), Pour la libération de la crainte, deux amendements à la Charte : contrôle atomique et limitation du droit de veto, Éditions de la Baconnière
- Edgard Milhaud (1948), Sur la ligne de partage des temps, Éditions de la Baconnière

== Sources ==
- Bourlac, Jean-Paul, "Isaac Edgard MILHAUD", Geneanet (in French)
- Daele, Jasmien van (2010), ILO Histories: Essays on the International Labour Organization and Its Impact on the World During the Twentieth Century, Peter Lang, ISBN 978-3-0343-0516-7
- CIRIEC, CIRIEC International
- Maitron, "MILHAUD Edgard", Dictionaire Biographique Mouvement Social (in French), Maitron/Editions de l'Atelier
- Prix nobel de la paix; candidature de M. Edgard Milhaud, Professeur d'économie politique à l'Université de Genève (in French), Geneva: Journal de Genève, 1948
