= David Griffiths (co-operative economist) =

Co-operative economist

David Griffiths is a co-operative economist, who has contributed a number of books and articles on the subject of unemployment, the history of Victoria's Co-operative movement, and 'social care co-operatives' amongst other subjects. Between 1981 and 1984, Griffiths was the Co-ordinator of the Victorian State Government's Co-operative Development Program, and the Social Welfare officer for the charity the Brotherhood of St. Laurence. Griffiths is the current Secretary, and a former Chairman, of the Co-operative Federation of Victoria, and is the webmaster and a regular contributor to the CFV's australia.coop web portal. australia.coop was the first country-wide web portable under the .coop domain established in the world. In February 2007 he became the webmaster for the web site of the International Co-operative Alliance http://www.ica.coop
