= Emmanuel-Louis Gruner =

French engineer and geologist (1809–1883)

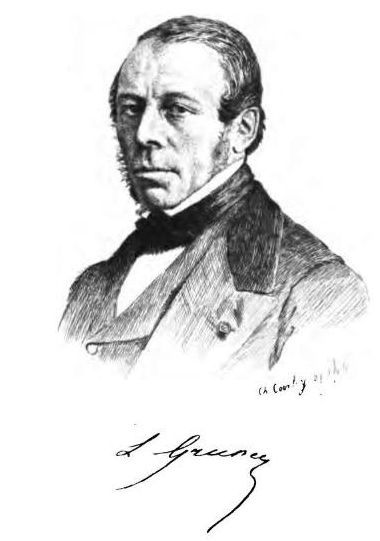
Emmanuel-Louis Gruner

Emmanuel-Louis Gruner (11 May 1809 – 26 March 1883) was a French engineer and geologist. He was born in Switzerland in the Ittigen municipality and died in Beaucaire. He worked as a scientist in metallurgy and geology.

== Childhood ==
Emmanuel-Louis Gruner was born on 11 May 1809, and was the fourth child of sixteen children. He is part of a lineage of scientists, of which Albrecht von Haller a Swiss anatomist and naturalist, from his mother side, and his paternal grandfather was a cartographer. His mother, who died when he was 21 had a lasting influence on him, which left him as a devout Christian for the rest of his life.

== Education ==
At 9 years old he attended the Gottstadt institution near the Jura Mountains. Run by Pastor Zehender, he studied for 7 years until the age of 16. He then went to study in Geneva University for 2 years until 1827. During that, he presented a machine design to the Geneva Society of Arts, for which he received a medal from that Society.

After leaving the University, he returned to his parents for six to seven months, until he went to prepare for the exam at the École Polytechnique in Paris.

He was admitted the same year, and ranked 9th. He graduated in his third year at the top of his class. He became a naturalized citizen of France in order to join the École nationale supérieiure des mines de Paris (The PSL), and eventually joined the Corps des Mines.

== Career ==
After some time travelling in Germany and Central Europe, he studied mining practices, and subsequently obtained a position in Saint-Étienne in 1834. He was appointed because the Loire Basin was the most active centre of coal manufacturing at the time. He would then publish articles about coal formations in La Creuse, notably, the coal formations of Bosmoreau.

In 1835, he became a chemistry professor at MINES Saint-Étienne. Then in 1847, he was chief appointed engineer in the Poitier mines. From 1852 to 1858, he became the headmaster over MINES Saint-Étienne, then was appointed chair of metallurgy at the PSL until 1872. He took various positions in the French Administration of Mines until his retirement in 1879.

== Legacy ==
His son, Édouard Gruner, was a prominent civil engineer. In 1869, he was elected as a member of the American Philosophical Society.

Emmanuel-Louis Gruner died on 26 March 1883 from a lung condition.

== Sources ==
- "Édouard Emmanuel GRUNER (1849-1933)", Annales des Mines (in French)
- "NOTICE NÉCROLOGIQUE SUR L. E. GRUNER INSPECTEUR GÉNÉRAL DES MINES (1849-1933)", Annales des Mines (in French)
