= Annals of Public and Cooperative Economics =

- Discipline: Economics
- Language: English

Publication details
- Former names: Annales de la régie directe, Annales de l'Economie collective/Annals of Collective Economy
- History: 1908-present
- Publisher: Wiley-Blackwell on behalf of the International Centre of Research and Information on the Public, Social and Cooperative Economy. (Belgium)
- Frequency: Quarterly

Standard abbreviations
- ISO 4: Ann. Public Coop. Econ.

Indexing
- ISSN: 1370-4788 (print); 1467-8292 (web)

Links
- Journal homepage; Online access

Annals of Public and Cooperative Economics is a quarterly academic journal published by Wiley-Blackwell on behalf of the International Centre of Research and Information on the Public, Social and Cooperative Economy (CIRIEC). The journal was established in 1908 by Edgard Milhaud, who founded CIRIEC in 1947 to continue publication of the Annals. The journal publishes papers on theoretical and empirical developments in public, cooperative or non-profit economics as well as literature reviews in this field. Annals of Public and Cooperative Economics covers the fields of microfinance, mutual and cooperative societies, networks industries, nonprofit organizations, profit sharing, public and mixed enterprises and regulated private enterprises.
