= Jessica Gordon Nembhard =

American economist

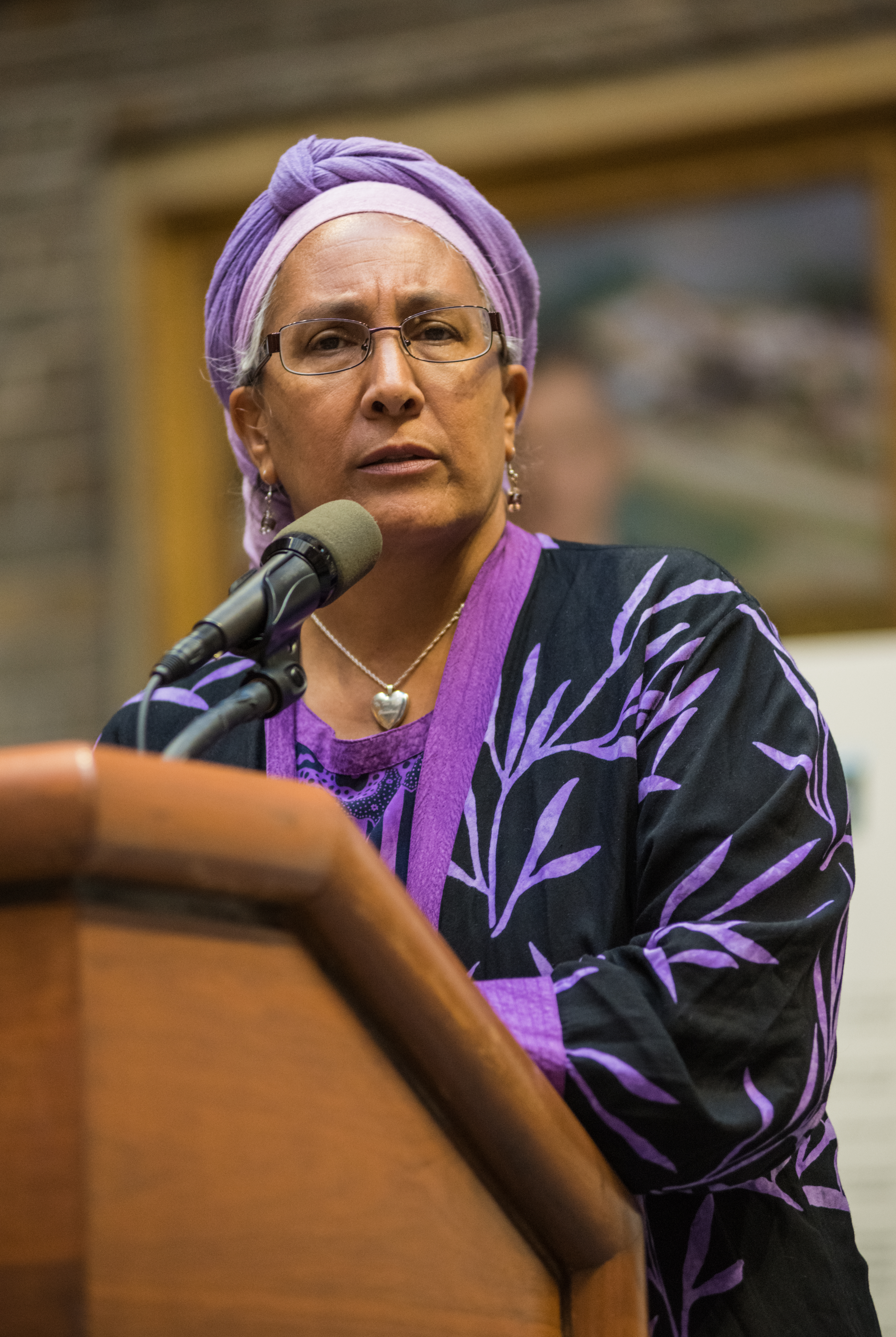
- Born: July 3, 1956 (age 70); New York City, New York
- Relatives: Edmund Gordon

Academic background
- Education: Yale University; University of Massachusetts Amherst

Academic work
- Discipline: Political economics
- Institutions: John Jay College of Criminal Justice, City University of New York

Jessica Gordon Nembhard (born July 3, 1956) is an American political economist. She has published books and articles in major economics journals. She is currently Professor of Community Justice and Social Economic Development in the Department of Africana Studies at John Jay College, City University of NY.

Gordon Nembhard was inducted into the U.S. Cooperative Hall of Fame in May, 2016.

Gordon Nembhard's work has covered a variety of topics, including:

- Community-based economic development
- Alternative urban development strategies
- Cooperative economics and worker ownership
- Racial and economic inequality
- Wealth inequality
- Credit unions
- Popular economic literacy
- Community-based asset building
- Community-based approaches to justice

== Collective Courage ==
In May 2014, Gordon Nembhard's Collective Courage: A History of African American Cooperative Economic Thought and Practice was published, aimed at chronicling African American cooperative business ownership and its role in the social movements for civil rights and economic equality. A study of African American history organizing various forms of cooperatives, "Collective Courage" adds the details of cooperative economic behavior to African-American history resulting in an increased understanding of African American collective economic history and offers guidance for grassroots economic organizing.

== Selected publications ==
=== Books ===
- 2014. Collective Courage: A History of African American Cooperative Economic Thought and Practice. Pennsylvania State University Press. Description & TOC and preview.
- 1996. Capital Control, Financial Regulation, and Industrial Policy in South Korea and Brazil. Praeger Publishers. Description and chapter-preview links.

=== Articles ===
- 2014. "Community-based Asset Building and Community Wealth." Review of Black Political Economy 41, pp. 101–117. https://doi.org/10.1007/s12114-014-9184-z
- 2013. “Community Development Credit Unions: Securing and Protecting Assets in Black Communities.” Review of Black Political Economy 40, pp. 459–490. https://doi.org/10.1007%2Fs12114-013-9166-6
- 2012. “Wealth Affirming Policies for Women of Color.” (with Kris Marsh) Review of Black Political Economy special issue “The Invisible Woman” Vol. 39, pp. 353–360.
- 2011. "Worker Cooperatives and the Solidarity Economy Movement." (with Emily Kawano) Luxemburg Journal, #3, pp. 14–31.
- 2008. "Alternative Economics, a Missing Component in the African American Studies Curriculum: Teaching Public Policy and Democratic Community Economics to Black Students." In “Special Issue: Black Political Economy in the 21st Century: Exploring the Interface of Economics and Black Studies.” Journal of Black Studies Vol. 38 No. 5, pp. 758–782.
- 2006. “Principles and Strategies for Reconstruction: Models of African American Community-Based Cooperative Economic Development.” Harvard Journal of African American Public Policy Vol. 12, pp. 39–55.
- 2004a. “Non-Traditional Analyses of Cooperative Economic Impacts: Preliminary Indicators and a Case Study.” Review of International Co-operation Vol. 97, No. 1 (2004), pp. 6–21.
- 2004b. “Cooperative Ownership and the Struggle for African American Economic Empowerment.” Humanity & Society Vol. 28, No. 3, 298–321.
- 2002a. “Cooperatives and Wealth Accumulation: Preliminary Analysis.” American Economic Review Vol. 92, No.2, pp. 325–329.
- 2002b. “Rhonda M. Williams: Competition, Race, Agency and Community.” “Special Issue: Tribute to Rhonda M. Williams.” (with Gary Dymski) Review of Black Political Economy Vol. 29, No.4, pp. 25–42.
- 2000a. “Racial and Ethnic Economic Inequality: The International Record.” (with William Darity) American Economic Review Vol. 90, No. 2, pp. 308–311.
- 2000b. “Democratic Economic Participation and Humane Urban Redevelopment.” Trotter Review, pp. 26–31.
- 1999. "Cooperative Economics -- A Community Revitalization Strategy." (with Curtis Haynes Jr.) Review of Black Political Economy, Vol. 27, No. 1, pp. 47–71.
- 1994. "Social Science Literature Concerning African American Men." (with Edmund T. Gordon and Edmund W. Gordon) The Journal of Negro Education, Vol. 63, No. 4, pp. 508–531.
- 1983. "Influence of Parent Practices Upon the Reading Achievement of Good and Poor Readers." (with P.H. Shields and D. Dupree) The Journal of Negro Education, Vol. 52, No. 4, pp. 436–445.
