= Breux-Jouy =

Commune in Île-de-France, France

- Commune
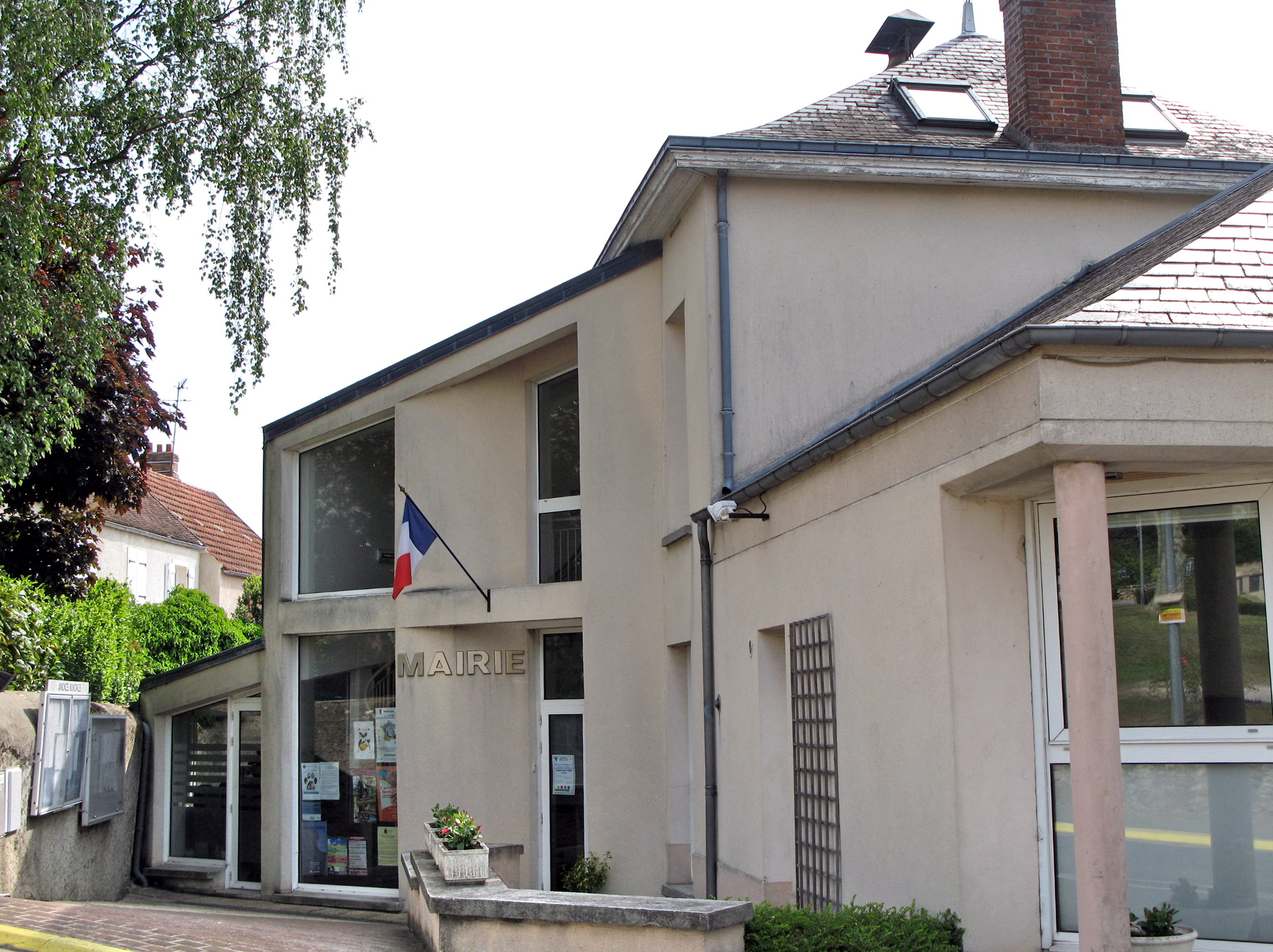
- The town hall in Breux-Jouy
- Location of Breux-Jouy
- Location within France Location within Île-de-France (region)
- Coordinates: 48°33′41″N 2°10′40″E
- Country: France
- Region: Île-de-France
- Department: Essonne
- Arrondissement: Étampes
- Canton: Dourdan

Government
  - Mayor (2020–2026): Alberto Rodrigues
- Area^{1}: 4.68 km^{2} (1.81 sq mi)
- Highest elevation: 151 m (495 ft)
- Lowest elevation: 55 m (180 ft)
- Population (2023): 1,285
  - Density: 275/km^{2} (711/sq mi)
- Time zone: UTC+01:00 (CET)
  - Summer (DST): UTC+02:00 (CEST)
- INSEE/Postal code: 91106 /91650
- ^{1} French Land Register data, which excludes lakes, ponds, glaciers > 1 km^{2} (0.386 sq mi or 247 acres) and river estuaries.

Breux-Jouy (French pronunciation: [bʁø ʒwi]) is a commune in the Essonne department in Île-de-France in northern France.

Inhabitants of Breux-Jouy are known as Brojiciens.

== See also ==
- Communes of the Essonne department
