= Rhonda M. Williams =

American economist (1957–2000)

- Born: January 1, 1957
- Died: November 7, 2000 (aged 43)

Academic background
- Education: Harvard University; Massachusetts Institute of Technology

Academic work
- Discipline: political economy, gender analysis, cultural studies

Rhonda Michèle Williams (January 1, 1957 – November 7, 2000) was an American professor, activist and political economist whose work combined economics with multiple other social fields including race and gender analysis, law, politics, public policy and cultural studies. She aimed to show how the examination of the roles of race and gender in economics benefitted from an inclusive approach rather than a separate and fragmented analysis in order to ensure that issues of economic inequality and discrimination were aptly addressed. Williams was also noted as being consistent in aligning her own ethics with economic analysis resulting in a legacy in the political economy of race and gender.

She worked in Economics and Afro- American Studies departments at the University of Texas at Austin, Yale University, the New School for Social Research and University of Maryland, College Park while also giving lectures at several other universities. Williams is credited for having authored and co-authored twenty-five journal articles. Popularly, she edited Race, Markets and Social outcomes with Patrick L Mason, another notable scholar and acting Director of African American Studies at Florida State University.

She died of lung cancer on November 7, 2000.

== Education ==
Williams received a B.A in economics from Harvard University in 1978 and her Ph.D. in economics from the Massachusetts Institute of Technology in 1983 with a focus in labour economics.

== Career ==
Williams' roles throughout her career highlighted an amalgamation of economics, Afro-American studies and women's studies. Her roles related to this included, being a professor in Afro-American Studies at the University of Texas Austin (1983–1987), assistant professor for Afro-American studies, women's studies and economics at Yale University (1987–1989) and a joint appointment in economics and Afro-American studies at the University of Maryland, College Park, where she was eventually an associate professor and director for the Afro-American Studies Program at the time of her death (2000). She was also able to lecture at some of the United States' top-ranking higher education institutions (according to the Times Higher Education World Rankings and U.S. News & World Report) such as Harvard's, Radcliffe Public Policy Centre, Duke University and Mount Holyoke College, one of the schools in the Seven Sisters Alliance. While teaching, she also worked as a consultant for the public-school system for 9 years in Prince George's County Maryland under the county's Multicultural Teacher Education Training Institute.

== Research and academic work ==
Williams, through her work, attempted to bring clarity on how economic analysis and evaluations geared toward policy reform needed to incorporate gender and race if they were to adequately address inequity and discrimination in the labour market as this provided a broader picture, shaping understanding of these issues. Her research and recommendations aimed to redress racial injustices, making connections between labor markets and competition within themes of capitalist competition and wealth accumulation and the effect on disadvantaged social groups.

== Selected scholarship ==
"The Changing Contours of Discrimination: Race, Gender, and Structural Economic Change" (1994)

This chapter was written in conjunction with fellow female economist M.V Lee Badgett, whereby Williams and Badgett aimed to look at the impacts of rising inequality across the genders and the races to see specifically where the benefits, or lack thereof, accrue. This was achieved through a look at the labour markets prior to 1970 followed by a data analysis of the shifts in the labour market in the 1970s and 1980s, looking at numerical values for unemployment, low wage employment and high wage employment of black men and white men and black women and white women (insufficient data prevented them from analyzing other groups such as Hispanic, Asian American and Native American). They found that men and white individuals had bigger shares of high wage employment, women collectively increased their share of high wage employment and black individuals showed modest growth but increased their share of serious unemployment. From their analysis it was seen that, for example, individuals with weekly incomes below the workforce median or unemployment for longer than 11 weeks were more highly represented in black communities than white communities across the sample years 1973, 1979 and 1987 and there was a 16% to 20% difference between white and black individuals that earned weekly incomes above the median wage.

Their findings were that restructuring of the manufacturing sector increased competition for employment opportunities with white workers and also reduced the cost of employment discrimination against black men. This meant that black workers accessed employment at a lower rate. Furthermore, although growth in female high wage employment was observed, this was primarily to the benefit of white women rather than their black counterparts leading to a convergence of white women with white men in the labor markets. According to Williams and Badgett this was likely because of white women's perceived 'kinship' and proximity to likeness in appearance making them more palatable in the workforce, a social behaviour with economic effects, and also due to white women's increased share of the labour force which disincentivized their discrimination due to increasing costs of discrimination. As a conclusion, Williams and Badgett noted that black individuals are unable to replicate the labour market attributes of their white counterparts and because of this then competition alone cannot combat discrimination in the labor market. As such, governments would need to adopt policies that help combat employment discrimination if inequality along racial divides was to decline.

"Race, Markets, and Social Outcomes" (1997)

A collaborative editorial effort between Williams and colleague Patrick Mason, this book was edited by the pair, where they also wrote the introduction, as a means to bring more scholarly work on the role that race plays the political economy of the United States. In their introduction they put forward the belief that although many scholars were willing to accept that race was an important factor in the determination of economic and social outcomes, the analysis of this was partisan and its construction janus-faced. According to them, in pejorative discussions race was factored in but in discussions of more positive matters such as economic productivity then race seized to matter in the literature available. They put forward that this was fuelled by the market power hypothesis that economists seem to agree to where an inverse relationship is observed between market competition and racial discrimination. The collection of papers in the book aimed to challenge this hypothesis by looking at the role of race in markets plausibly affected by racial discrimination such as labour, health, crime and housing and credit

"How Does It Feel to Be Free?: Reflections on Racial Economic Inequality in the Era of 'Color Blind' Law" (1999)

Williams co-authored this article with William Spriggs (also commonly known for being the Assistant Secretary for Policy at the Department of Labor during the Obama Administration). This article was a discussion on black-white inequality in relation to human capital theory and colour-blind jurisprudence, believing that the two came together to further white economic supremacy with economists and jurists further institutionalizing black-white economic inequality. They argued that the aforementioned internalized a hegemonic understanding of race in their evaluations and processes and their reluctance to altering this, despite many scholars presenting gaps in their hypothesis and putting forward alternatives, had an effect in shaping what is viewed as normal in popularized opinions, political conversations and prevailing conditions and treatment. Furthermore, Williams and Spriggs asserted that this colour-blindness, by making laws and markets 'raceless' took away from the visibility that white privilege and its benefits had on its beneficiaries and this was inculcated into the shaping of legal doctrine and human capital accumulation and ultimately had an effect on labor market outcomes.

== Selected works ==
- Williams, Rhonda M. (1987). "Capital, Competition, and Discrimination: A Reconsideration of Racial Earnings Inequality". Review of Radical Political Economics. 19 (2): 1–15. doi:10.1177/048661348701900201. ISSN 0486-6134. S2CID 154906930.
- Williams, Rhonda M.; Smith, Peggie R. (1990). "What Else do Unions do?: Race and Gender in Local 35". The Review of Black Political Economy. 18 (3): 59–74. doi:10.1007/BF02717875. ISSN 0034-6446. S2CID 154923467.
- Spriggs, William E.; Williams, Rhonda M. (1996). "A Logit Decomposition Analysis of Occupational Segregation: Results for the 1970s and 1980s". The Review of Economics and Statistics. 78 (2): 348. doi:10.2307/2109939. JSTOR 2109939.
- Williams, Rhonda M. (1988). "Beyond Human Capital: Black Women, Work and Wages". Wellesley Centers for Women (Working Paper).
- Harley, Sharon; Black Women and Work Collective, Black Women and Work Collective, eds. (2002). "Getting Paid: Black Women Economists Reflect on Women and Work". Sister Circle: Black Women Represent Work. New Brunswick, NJ: Rutgers University Press. ISBN 9780813530611.

== Leadership positions and committees ==
- 1987-1990 Member board of directors, National Education Association, NEA
- 1990-1994 Board of editors, Feminist Studies
- 1992-1998 Leadership positions, National Economic Association
- 1992-1998 Elected position, board of directors, International Association for Feminist Economics, IAFFE
- 1994-1998 Founding associate editor, Feminist Economics
- 1995-1996 Member nominating committee, National Education Association, NEA
- 1998-2000 editorial board, Feminist Economics
- Frequently, reviewer, The Review of Black Political Economy.

== Prizes and awards in her honor ==
- International Association for Feminist Economics, IAFFE established the Rhonda Williams Prize in her honor, a $1000 award that provides scholars from underrepresented groups with partial funding to travel and present papers at the IAFFE's annual conference as well as a registration fee waiver.
- University of Maryland has the Rhonda M Williams Graduate Fellowship fund, a fund that is intended to provide financial support to students in the final year of their Bachelor of Arts or Masters of Public Policy programs at the university.
- The National Economic Association established The Rhonda M. Williams Doctoral Dissertation Award, an annual award given to doctoral candidates of color in recognition of outstanding dissertations in alignment with the NEA's mission of promoting economic growth among peoples of color by creating and distributing knowledge on the economic issues they face.
