= Charles Gide =

French economist and historian

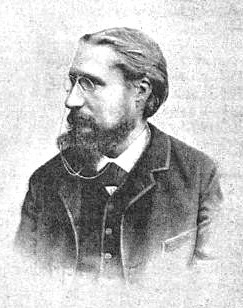
- Born: 29 June 1847; Uzès, Kingdom of France
- Died: 12 March 1932 (aged 84); Paris, France

Academic work
- Discipline: Theory of social economy History of economic thought
- School or tradition: Historical school of economics

Charles Gide (French: [ʒid]; 1847–1932) was a French economist and historian of economic thought. He was a professor at the University of Bordeaux, at Montpellier, at Université de Paris and finally at Collège de France. His nephew was the author André Gide.

== Academic work ==
A founder of Revue d'économie politique in 1887, Gide was a proponent of the French historical school of economics.

Gide supported economist Léon Walras, as they shared a social philosophy, social activism, and disdain for the "Manchester-style" economics of the journalistes.

== Social activism ==
During the early 1880s Gide worked with Édouard de Boyve, founder in 1884 of the cooperative Abeille Nîmoise, and with the former manufacturer Auguste Marie Fabre. These three men founded the French cooperative philosophy that came to be known as the École de Nîmes. The Sociétés Coopératives de Consommation de France had its first national congress in Paris on 27 July 1885. The journal l'Émancipation was initiated at this meeting, and was published first on 15 November 1886 in Nîmes. Gide, de Boyve and Fabre all contributed to the journal.

Gide was active in the social Protestant movement, as were other Musée social members such as Jules Siegfried (1837–1922), Édouard Gruner (1849–1933), Henri Monod (1843–1911) and Pierre-Paul Guieysse (1841–1914). As a Protestant Christian Socialist, Gide was involved with progressive politics in France, endorsing the université populaire philosophy after the Dreyfus Affair. He promoted the establishment of a School for Advanced Social Studies (École supérieure de sciences sociales) (1899). Additionally, he served among the early faculty of the École supérieure de journalisme de Paris. Together with the School for Social Studies, it was established in 1899 as one of three grandes écoles developing from the Collège libre de science sociales initiated in 1895.

Gide endorsed the Union pour la Verite (League for Truth) created by philosopher Paul Desjardins in 1892 promoting the cause of the Jewish army officer Alfred Dreyfus during the political scandal involving him. Gide was interested in reform projects as well, such as the Alliance d'Hygiène Sociale (Alliance of Social Hygiene, created in 1905), and reported on the social economy exhibition at the Paris Exposition Universelle of 1900.

Gide was a champion of the cooperative philosophy, including both agricultural and consumers' cooperatives, during the first third of the 20th century. His book, Consumers' Co-operative Societies, which was published first in French in 1904, and in English in 1921, is a classic of co-operative economics, in the tradition of Co-operative Federalism.

== Works ==
- Charles Gide – Écrits 1869–1886 (Charles Gide – Writings 1869–1886), Éditions Harmattan/Committee for the edition of works of Charles Gide, Paris (1999)
- Principes d'économie politique, (1883) ISBN 978-1-4123-5251-2; translated to English as Principles of Political Economy (1924); 26th ed., Paris, Librairie du Recueil Sirey (1931). On line edition Marcelle Bergeron, École polyvalente Dominique-Racine de Chicoutimi, Ville de Saguenay.
- Économie sociale. Les institutions du progrès social au début du XXe siècle. Paris, Larose, 1905.
- Coopération et économie sociale 1886–1904 (1905). Patrice Devillers. éd. L’Harmattan v. 4 (2001)
- Charles Gide, "Economic Literature in France at the Beginning of the Twentieth Century", The Economic Journal, Vol. 17, No. 66 (Jun., 1907), pp. 192–212. doi:10.2307/2220664
- Cours d'économie politique (1909); Paris, Librairie de la Société du Recueil Sirey, 5e édition, refondue et augmentée (1919) On line ed. Marcelle Bergeron, École polyvalente Dominique-Racine de Chicoutimi, Province de Québec.
- Les Sociétés Coopératives de Consommation, (1904); translated to English as Consumers' Co-operative Societies (1921).
- A History of Economic Doctrines from the Time of the Physiocrats to the Present Day, with Charles Rist; tr. R. Richards. London, George P. Harrap (1915).
- Les Colonies Communistes et Coopératives (1928, translated into English as Communist and Co-operative Colonies in 1930).

== See also ==
- History of economic thought

== Sources ==
- Horne, Janet R. (2002-01-11), A Social Laboratory for Modern France: The Musée Social and the Rise of the Welfare State, Duke University Press, ISBN 0-8223-2792-9
