= The Drivers Cooperative =

American ridesharing company

- Type: Worker cooperative
- Industry: transportation, technology
- Founded: 2020
- Headquarters: New York City, New York, United States
- Area served: New York City
- Key people: Mohammad Hossen, Ken Lewis, Erik Forman
- Website: drivers.coop

The Drivers Cooperative or Co-op Ride is an American ridesharing company and mobile app that is a workers cooperative, owned collectively by the drivers. The cooperative launched in May 2021 in New York City, with the first 2,500 drivers issued their ownership certificates in a media event.

== History ==
The cooperative was co-founded by Ken Lewis, Erik Forman, and former Uber executive Alissa Orlando. It was launched in April 2020 in New York City.

The Co-Op Ride app is on the iOS and Android platforms and is built on Google Maps, Stripe, and Waze. By July, the app had been downloaded by 30,000 users and the number of drivers increased to 3,400, and by August there were 40,000 users.

The cooperative is owned by the drivers themselves, and takes 15% from each ride for business overhead costs, as opposed to the 25% to 40% ride hail apps like Uber or Lyft take per ride. While being ultimately owned by the driver members, not by investors, the cooperative began with seed money from the Minnesota-based Community Development Financial Institution Shared Capital Cooperative, the local Lower East Side People's Federal Credit Union, and welcomed individual donations via crowdfunding in the form of revenue sharing debt on Wefunder. Each driver is a member of the cooperative and owns one share of the company and one vote in business and leadership decisions. In addition to a larger percentage of the fees per ride driven, each driver as a part-owner will also receive a share of the company's profits after loans and other expenses are paid, in the form of weighted dividends. The drivers use their own cars.

The cooperative vets its owner-members further than what is already performed by the New York City Taxi and Limousine Commission (TLC), and gives a fixed price when a car is ordered and does not engage in surge pricing. The TLC imposed a minimum payrate for mobile app ridesharing companies operating in New York city in 2018. In 2021 that is $1.26 per mile which Uber and Lyft do not pay above; the cooperative pays a minimum mileage of $1.64. The cooperative intends to be able to set aside 10% of profits to community foundations and other non-profits and community organizations.

The cooperative has engaged in advocacy around a policy agenda voted on by its members. Legislation to achieve this policy goal was introduced by State Senator Julia Salazar and Assemblymember Jessica González-Rojas, with the support of a coalition led by The Drivers Cooperative, United Auto Workers Region 9 and 9A, Sunrise Movement, New York Lawyers for the Public Interest, and New York Communities for Change.
