= Percy Redfern =

Journalist and historian of the co-operative movement (1875–1958)

- Born: 1875; Leicester, England
- Died: 11 February 1958 (aged 82–83); York, England
- Occupations: Writer; Journalist; Retail worker
- Movement: Co-operative
- Spouse: Edith Barber (m. 1905)

Percy Redfern (1875 – 11 February 1958) was a British co-operative movement writer and journalist and an advocate for consumer co-operation.

== Biography ==
Redfern was born the illegitimate son of a housekeeper in Leicester in 1875. He was raised by his father, Francis Redfern, who was an architect and by his stepmother. He went to seven different schools, including Nottingham Grammar School, before becoming an apprentice to a draper in Nottingham. He disliked the harsh conditions and corrupt practices of the retail industry and began to take an interest in socialism. He joined the Social Democratic Federation, contributed to the Federation's paper Justice and became an active member of the Independent Labour Party. Redfern was a pacificist and vegetarian. He had a succession of jobs including working for a wholesaler and as a storekeeper for the Manchester Vegetarian Society.

In 1899 he began working in a clerical job in Manchester for the Co-operative Wholesale Society (CWS) and subsequently began editing the CWS's monthly magazine the Wheatsheaf and its annual, the People's Year Book. In his 1920 manifesto The Consumers' Place in Society he advocated for consumer co-operation, arguing that the consumer has a key role to play in bringing about a new social order through voluntary collectivism. He ascribed central importance to the book Looking Backward at the time of the rise of the 'New Socialism.' In his autobiography he testified that 'to grasp at every means of radical change I read more industrial history, more of the opposite socialist futures pictured by Bellamy."

In 1913 he wrote his first history of the Co-operative Wholesale Society, The Story of the C.W.S., followed in 1938 by The New History of the C.W.S. He retired from the Co-operative Wholesale Society in 1938 but continued his work as a writer, with his autobiography Journey to Understanding published in 1946. He died in York on 11 February 1958 and was buried at the Southern Cemetery in Manchester.

== Publications ==
- —— (1907). Tolstoy: A Study. London: A.C. Fifield.
- —— (1913). The Story of the C.W.S. Manchester: C.W.S.
- —— (1915). Co-operation For All. Manchester: Co-operative Union.
- —— (1920). The Consumers' Place in Society. Manchester: Co-operative Union.
- —— (1923). John T. W. Mitchell: Pioneer of Consumers' Co-operation. Manchester: Co-operative Union.
- —— (1929). Twenty Faces the World. London: Ernest Benn.
- —— (1938). The New History of the C.W.S. Manchester: C.W.S.
- —— (1946). Journey to Understanding. London: G. Allen & Unwin.
