= Jean Robieux =

French physicist

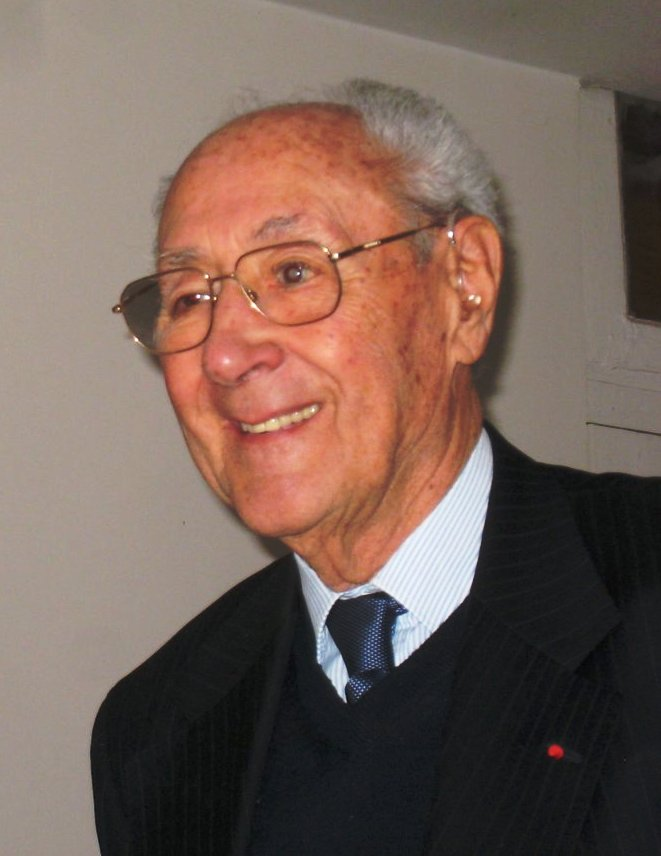
- Born: 15 October 1925; Jugon-les-Lacs, France
- Died: 14 June 2012 (aged 86); Chatenay-Malabry
- Education: Aerospace engineer
- Alma mater: École polytechnique École nationale de l'aviation civile University of Paris; California Institute of Technology
- Known for: Nuclear Fusion Laser

Jean Robieux (15 October 1925 – 14 June 2012) was a French physicist. A graduate from École Polytechnique and Doctor of Science, he is a leading French specialist in laser and optronics. He is the former scientific director of the Research Center of Alcatel Mobile Phones at Marcoussis, and during many years, head of the Robotics college at the École centrale Paris. He is a chairman of the board of directors of the school and chairman of the Scientific Council. He followed in particular the development the materials department. He suggested the initial creation of the ECAM Rennes - Louis de Broglie school in 1988.

== Biography ==
He is a graduate from École Polytechnique (1946–1949), École nationale de l'aviation civile (1949–1951), and received a Doctor of Science from University of Paris and also a Master of Science from the California Institute of Technology. In 1952, he was engineer at the California company Helipot and then responsible for controlling the manufacture of electrical and electronic equipment ordered by the Civil Aviation. Engineer, then head of laboratory at the Research Center of Wireless Company, he helped the foundation of the Centre de Corbeville from 1954 to 1961 where his work focuses on achieving high-speed wireless cable, the theory of the influence of precision manufacturing of antennas on their performance, the theory of general laws of the link between wave radiators, applications to surface waves and propagation, the innovations that drive the electrical control of the beam by ferrite antennas and semiconductors, methods currently used in radar. He founded the Company Cofelec. Founding Director of the Department "Physical Research Base" of the Centre de Recherches de la Compagnie Générale d’Electricité in Marcoussis, he is responsible for : Lasers Materials Semiconductor components and Chief Scientist and Scientific Advisor of the president of the Center research from 1975 to 1990. He was a professor at the École centrale Paris and founding director of the Robotics Option in 3rd year between 1982 and 1989.

Jean Robieux was a president of the Société d'encouragement pour l'industrie nationale, whose purpose is to highlight successful entrepreneurs in the development of techniques and new industrial processes, from 1984 to 1991.

Then he turned to the decentralization of training and research by creating the École Louis de Broglie in Rennes in 1990 which he is the founding president. The school trains engineers in computer science, materials and lasers. The management of the school Louis de Broglie and the training is provided by experimented engineers in mechanical and electrical industries. It has partnered with two other engineering schools: ECAM Lyon and EPMI in Cergy-Pontoise (Electricity, Manufacturing, Industrial Methods) to create the ECAM group which trains about 300 engineers per year.

To create new technologies from research in mechanics, especially for the automotive industry, he founded the Institut Maupertuis in Rennes in 2003. Processing technology with the laser is studied, particularly for the reduction of vehicle weight.

He has a membership of the French Academy of Sciences and of the Académie des Technologies (Academy of Technologies).

== Works ==
Jean Robieux is responsible for the discovery of the principle of control of laser fusion in 1961 and the discovery of the principle of laser isotope separation, and the creation of elementary particles by laser. All contributions are outlined in his book « High Power Laser Interactions : Isotopes Separation - Nuclear Fusion Control - Elementary Particles Selective Creation ». He obtained the realization of a neodymium-doped laser emitting 500 joules in 30 ns, 30 times more powerful than lasers built in the world at that time. He carries out experiments to demonstrate the principle possibility of issuing average powers exceeding 1 MW. They open the way for the laser weapon in 1967. Using a laser made by the research center in Marcoussis, CEA Limeil produced in 1969 for the first time ever in a reproducible, neutrons during the interaction laser / material, he allows then to pave the way towards the control of fusion. Today, Jean Robieux is involved in research on laser fusion.

== Bibliography ==
- Doctor Thesis : Lois générales de la liaison entre radiateurs d'ondes.Applications aux ondes de surface et à la propagation
- Perspectives ouvertes par l'évolution des recherches dans le domaine du laser
- High Power Interactions : Isotopes separation - Nuclear fusion control - Elementary particles selective creation. Ed. Lavoisier-2000
- Vers l'énergie abondante sans pollution. La fusion nucléaire par laser. Ed.Louis de Broglie-2008
- Towards the end of global warming. Abundant energy without pollution. Laser nuclear fusion». Ed.Louis de Broglie-2009

== Awards ==
- Officier of the Légion d'honneur (2000)
- Prix Quinquennal de l’Institut Montefiore à l’Université de Liège (1961)
- Médaille de Vermeil pour la Société d'encouragement pour l'industrie nationale (1966)
- Médaille Blondel (1966)
- Grand Prix de l’Electronique Général Ferrier (1967)
- Grand Prix Technique de la ville de Paris (1972)
- Prix Alexandre Joannidès, Grand Prix de l’Académie des Sciences (1974)
- Grande médaille Michel Perret de la Société d’Encouragement pour l’Industrie Nationale (1977)
