= Paul Lambert (cooperator) =

Co-operator and economist (1912–1977)

- Born: 21 February 1912
- Died: 17 September 1977 (aged 65)
- Education: University of Liège
- Occupations: Economist; Cooperator; Writer
- Organization: FEBECOOP; CIRIEC International
- Notable work: La Doctrine coopération (1959)
- Movement: Cooperative movement

Paul Lambert (21 February 1912 – 17 September 1977) was a Belgian cooperator and professor of economics at the University of Liège.

Lambert gained a doctorate in law from the University of Liège in 1935. When Belgium was invaded in 1940 by Nazi Germany Lambert was conscripted and subsequently spent five years as a prisoner of war, which he recounted in his 1946 book Hommes perdus à l’Est ("Men Lost in the East"). He returned to academia after the war, later becoming chair of political economy at the law faculty of the University of Liège.

In the 1950s Lambert was elected to the board of the Belgian Federation of Socialist Consumer Cooperatives (FEBECOOP) before becoming president of the federation.

In 1957 Lambert succeeded Edgard Milhaud as president of the International Center of Research and Information on the Public, Social and Cooperative Economy (CIRIEC International).

In 1959 he authored La Doctrine coopération, an influential overview and history of the ideas and the economics of the co-operative movement. The work was translated into English as Studies in the Social Philosophy of Co-operation (1963).

In 1962 he represented FEBECOOP on the central committee of the International Co-operative Alliance (ICA) and then in 1966 on the ICA's executive committee.

He died on 17 September 1977 from cancer.

== Publications ==
- — (1946). Hommes perdus à l'Est (in French). Brussels: Dessart.
- — (1963). Studies in the Social Philosophy of Co-operation. Translated by Joseph Létargez. Co-operative Union.
