= J. T. W. Mitchell =

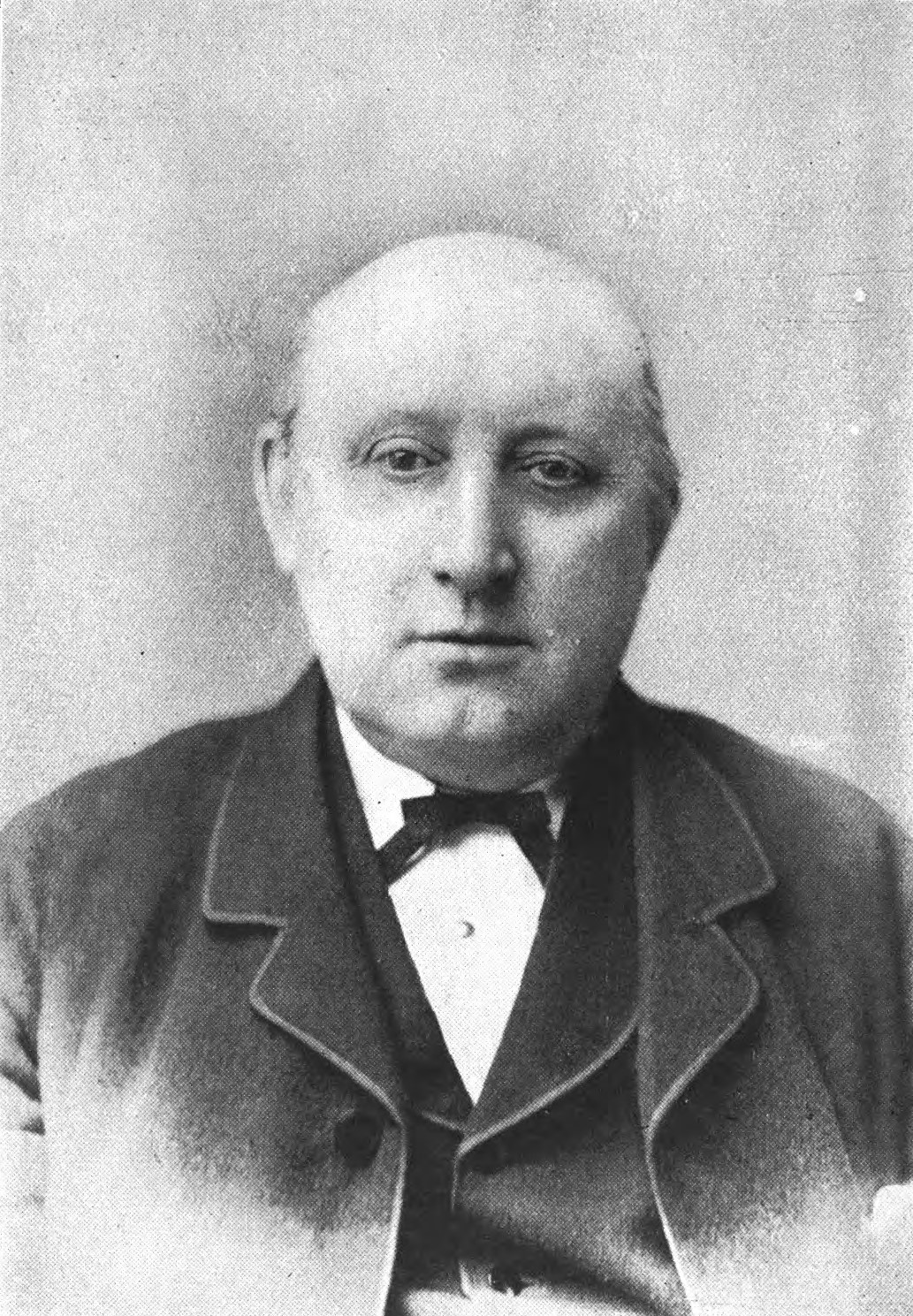
- Born: 18 October 1828; Rochdale, Lancashire, England
- Died: 16 March 1895 (aged 66); Rochdale, Lancashire, England
- Movement: Co-operative; Temperance

John Thomas Whitehead Mitchell (18 October 1828 – 16 March 1895) was a British co-operative activist.

Born in Rochdale to a single mother, Mitchell received some education at the Red Cross Street National School, and at a Sunday school. He left at the age of 10 or 11, to work as a piecer in a cotton mill, for 13 hours a day. When he was 17, he joined the Providence Independent Chapel, and the following year, he signed a pledge to abstain from alcohol, with the support of his mother, who ran a beer house. In 1850, he was part of a group of members who left the chapel, to found the New Milton Congregational Church, but he remained active in the Sons of Temperance organisation.

In 1848, a contact at the chapel found Mitchell work as a sorter in his wool warehouse, and he eventually rose to become the warehouse manager. He eventually left in 1867, to become a flannel dealer.

In 1853, Mitchell joined the Rochdale Society of Equitable Pioneers, joining its committee in 1856, and becoming secretary in 1857. He was a founder of the Rochdale Co-operative Manufacturing Society in 1854, and later became its chair. In 1869, he attended the first Co-operative Congress, and this inspired him to organise district meetings of the Co-operative Union. In 1874, he was elected as a Co-operative Wholesale Society (CWS) board member, becoming its chair before the end of the year. In his period as chair, the CWS grew to have a turnover of millions of pounds, and employed thousands of people. Mitchell's position gradually became full-time, although his compensation remained around £150 per year.

Mitchell gave evidence to the Royal Commission on Labour in 1892, and served as President of the Co-operative Congress in both 1879 and 1892. He served as liquidator of the Lancashire and Yorkshire Productive Society in 1878, and was able to keep it running with a loan from the CWS Bank, continuing to manage the business until his death, after which the CWS took it over. In 1893, he was awarded the Order of the Golden Cross, for facilitating trade with Greece.

In both 1893 and 1894, Mitchell stood unsuccessfully as a Liberal Party candidate for Rochdale Town Council. He died the following year.
