= Robert Pinot =

- Born: 28 January 1862; Boissy-Saint-Léger
- Died: 24 February 1926 (aged 64); Neuilly-sur-Seine
- Occupations: Sociologist, Lobbyist
- Known for: Secretary-general of the Comité des forges

Robert Pinot (English: /piːˈnoʊ/ pee-NOH, French: [ʁɔbɛʁ pino]; 28 January 1862 – 24 February 1926) was a French sociologist from the conservative Le Playist school who became a highly effective lobbyist for heavy industry owners. He was the long-term secretary-general of the Comité des forges, an association of iron and steel manufacturers that was influential in setting industrial policy, particularly during World War I (1914–18).

== Early years ==
Robert Pinot was born on 28 January 1862 in Boissy-Saint-Léger. He was admitted to the École des Mines in Paris in 1883, but left to join the Ministry of Finance. In 1885, three years after the death of Frédéric le Play, Henri de Tourville and Edmond Demolins founded a new journal, Science sociale. They brought with them a few adherents including Paul de Rousiers and Robert Pinot. Pinot studied at the École des Sciences politiques, and taught at this school from 1893 to 1899. Pinot agreed with Le Play's corporatist-paternalist views, and believed in the progressive character of industry associations. He thought that both étatisme and socialism were regressive. Pinot was a key contributor to La Science sociale, published by the Le Playist Societe d'Economie Sociale. (Note: The Le Playist Societe d'Economie Sociale followed the ideas of Pierre Guillaume Frédéric le Play.)

Pinot was appointed the first administrative director of the Musée social in 1894, with the mandate of overseeing its "sound and rapid organization." While at the Musée social, Pinot joined the Grand Cercle Républicain, organized by the Revue politique et parlementaire with the hope that it would supply leaders of a new conservative party. The Grand Cercle held meetings and banquets attended by leading moderate republicans who started to call themselves progressiste. The socialist journals called them conservative and reactionary. The group was strongly opposed to socialism and in favour of suppressing working class agitation. Pinot resigned from the Musée social in 1897 due to a disagreement with Aldebert de Chambrun and the Musee board. He felt that the institution had not maintained its goals of being purely scientific and outside politics. Perhaps more to the point, he also resented his lack of autonomy.

In 1899 Pinot was chosen as director of the syndicate of locomotive manufacturers, who thought he had the skills to negotiate for them with the politicians and bureaucrats. The manufacturers were struggling with erratic demand for their products, competition from abroad and the effects of recent labor laws on their costs. Pinot thought the syndicate was a counterweight to "an overloaded state, feeble or tyrannical, and a working class inflamed and misled by bad guides." He took an aggressive approach to lobbying through the press, lectures, meetings with politicians and bureaucrats, reports and testimony before parliamentary committees.

In 1899 the Minister of Commerce, Alexandre Millerand, issued a decree that gave trade unions semi-official status, including the right to elect members to the Conseil supérieur du travail, where they would join government and employer representatives in discussions of proposed legislation. In 1900 another decree established regional Conseils du travail to report on labour conditions and the effects of protective legislation, help arrange collective contracts and mediate in disputes. Pinot organized opposition by employees to these decrees, which were strongly opposed by large industrialists who feared the growth of trade unions now they had a stronger voice. Pinot gained support for employer positions in the Senate and the Conseil d'Etat, but was less successful with the Chamber of Deputies, although he succeeded in having some bills changed.

== Comité des forges ==
=== Pre-war ===
Robert de Wendel, president of the Comité des Forges de France (CFF) and vice-president of the Union des industries et métiers de la métallurgie (UIMM), died in 1903 and Baron Robert de Nervo became vice-president of both the CFF and the UIMM. In January 1904, at the initiative of Robert de Nervo, the company presidents Edmond Duval, Albert Jouet-Pastré and Léon Lévy asked for a small committee to outline an agreement for close cooperation between the CFF, UIMM and the associations of railway equipment manufacturers, ship builders, war material manufacturers. The arrangement was completed in February 1904 with Robert Pinot as secretary general. Pinot now led the five main metallurgical associations, which met at the CFF headquarters.

The Comité des Forges had become dormant, but Pinot soon brought it back to being the leading heavy industry organization. From 1906 to 1910 the Comité des forges was active in shaping the laws that gave workers a weekly day of rest, ensuring the regulations recognized that workers had to operate blast furnaces that ran around the clock seven days a week. Pinot played a role in all pre-war labor laws. He supplied deputies with information culled from the committee's collection of company records. His committee used its publications, mailing lists and contacts throughout the country to influence reluctant deputies, and coordinated activities by the member steel firms such as petitions and meetings with politicians.

During debates over tariffs in 1909–10 Pinot argued for protection on the basis of the importance of the iron and steel industry to national defense and the difficulty it faced in competing with foreign firms that had lower costs and greater access to skilled labor. The Comité des forges included engineering firms that purchased steel and were not in favor of high duties, but Pinot managed to maintain solidarity through a complex system of cartels and syndicates.

=== World War I ===
During World War I Pinot had great influence. During the war the government used Pinot and the staff of the Comité des forges to control import of metals and their distribution to manufacturers, and to give out contracts for armaments. In effect the committee had been given a monopoly over supply of armaments. Later, the Ministry of Armaments under Albert Thomas would have difficulty controlling heavy industry.

Pinot testified to the Senate Committee of Economic Expansion on 28 October 1915, saying that the return of Lorraine to France with its rich iron deposits would increase the amount of coal and coke that France had to import. However, if France also obtained access the coal deposits of the Saar the country could double its steel production and rival Germany. He advocated annexation of the Saar. The goal of the Comité des forges was not to expand at all costs, but to minimise the shock caused by the recovery of Lorraine. Pinot wanted to avoid competition with Germany for coal and coke after the war, and to avoid competition for markets. He was therefore in favour of German firms retaining partial ownership of assets in Lorraine, a position that was seen as treachery by small businesses and others who wanted to ruin Germany so France could become an uncontested economic leader.

When censorship was relaxed after World War I (1914–18) there were bitter complaints against the Comité des forges within and outside Parliament. It was said that the Comité des forges had allowed France to fall behind in industrialization before the war, and had colluded with the army to prevent bombing of the French steel works in the Briey region that had been taken by the Germans early in the war. As general secretary Robert Pinot defended himself and the steel masters, but the suspicion lingered and the Comité des Forges was attacked by the Left throughout the years that followed.

=== Post-war ===
In August 1917 Pinot had written to the chairman of the UIMM that workers were gaining more awareness of their collective power. The effects of mobilization, relocation of factories, exemption of armament workers from the draft, improved working conditions and wage increases would all be to increase the postwar collective strength of the workers. French industry must respond by organizing its own forces to gain government concessions. In the post-war period the UIMM acted in effect as the instrument of the Comité des forges for handling social issues. In 1919 Robert Pinot was secretary of both organizations. Pinot represented French industry at the International Labour Organization (ILO) and was vice-president of the National Economic Council. In the early 1920s Albert Thomas and Edgard Milhaud of the ILO proposed to develop expertise on the links between social and economic problems. As the delegate representing the French employers, Pinot despised the proposal, which he called "social control of the economy."

Early in 1920 there was an acute shortage of coal in France and a political crisis in Germany with disturbances in the demilitarized Ruhr. Germany sent troops into the Ruhr to restore peace, and on 6 April 1920 French troops occupied the Maingau: Frankfurt, Darmstadt and Offenbach. Two days later Pinot wrote to President Millerand informing him the British had cut off coal supplies to France using the threat of a miners' strike as an excuse, and with the Ruhr production of coal halted the French steel industry faced a severe and growing crisis. He asked that the government take action to prevent closure of the furnaces. In February 1920 there was also a brief railway strike over labour grievances, settled within two days but leaving bad feelings between both sides. The General Confederation of Labour (CGT) decided that they would demonstrate for nationalization of the railways with a strike starting on May Day. Marcel Peschaud, secretary-general of the Paris-Orléans company, discussed with Pinot the possibility of organizing professional groups and Chambers of Commerce to demand laws that would make strikes against public services illegal.

German demand for iron from Lorraine plummeted after the war. By 1922 total demand was just a tenth of the pre-war demand from the Ruhr alone. Contributing factors were the growing use of the Siemens-Martin process of open hearth furnaces for recycling scrap steel combined with availability of war material to be recycled. In early 1922 Pinot explained to Camille Cavallier of the steelworks at Pont-à-Mousson in Lorraine that this had "permitted a boycotting of our minette ore these past years."

A fresh coal crisis erupted in 1923. The Comité des forges toughened its attitude over the Ruhr. One group wanted ownership of German mines and factories to be ceded to French firms, while another wanted a permanent customs barrier between the Ruhr and the rest of Germany so France could obtain the coal at preferential prices. Pinot combined the various proposals and submitted them to the Poincaré government in mid November, demanding that France acquire majority or total ownership of German firms, not just minority positions. By January 1924 the German economy had stabilized while the franc was rapidly losing value. Poincaré told Pinot nothing could be done before the report of a group of experts on the Ruhr settlement. In May 1924 Pinot softened his position and called for France and Germany to cooperate in industrial policy. He acknowledged the weakness of French metallurgy by calling for a "return to the economic status quo ante bellum. He was not looking for hegemony for French metallurgy or a challenge to British interests, only for French firms to be able to produce for their home market and to compete elsewhere.

In 1921 Pinot had asked the president, Francois de Wendel, to make him a vice-president of the Comité des forges. Although Pinot was dedicated and efficient, he had a tendency to take credit for the Committee's actions. He was an employee rather than an owner, and de Wendel made it clear he would only be the most junior of five vice-presidents, with no prospect of becoming president. Pinot did not pretend to be apolitical. He stated in 1924, "industrialists cannot be indifferent to legislative tasks, and they have the right as citizens, a right never contested, to intervene at the moment of elections." Robert Pinot died unexpectedly in 1926. At the time of his death he was Vice-president-Delegate of the Comité des forges.

== Publications ==
- Robert Pinot (1908), La Science sociale et sa méthode, Paris: bureaux de la Science sociale
- Robert Pinot (1909), "Matériel de guerre et constructions navales", Exposition franco-britannique de Londres, 1908., Paris: Comité français des expositions à l'étranger
- Robert Pinot (1911), "Forces hydrauliques, électro-métallurgie, électro-chimie et industries qui s'y rattachent", Exposition universelle et internationale de Bruxelles 1910, Paris: Comité français des expositions à l'étranger
- Robert Pinot (1912), Quatre études sur l'industrie métallurgique française, Paris: Editions de la Revue financière universelle
- Robert Pinot (1915), Rapport sur les mines... Adopté en séance du Comité du 13 novembre 1915, Paris: Comité d'études économiques et administratives relatives à l'Alsace-Lorraine
- Robert Pinot (1916), La guerre : Deuxième série : La guerre et la vie économique, Paris: F. Alcan
- Robert Pinot (1917), La métallurgie et l'après guerre, St. Etienne: Société de l'industrie minérale
- Robert Pinot (1917), La métallurgie et l'après-guerre : Rapport adopté en séance du Comité du 10 février 1917, Paris: Comité d'études économiques et administratives relatives à l'Alsace-Lorraine
- Robert Pinot (1919), Le Comité des Forges de France au service de la nation (Août 1914 - Novembre 1918), Paris: A. Colin
- Robert Pinot (1924), Les oeuvres sociales des industries métallurgiques, Paris: A. Colin
- Robert Pinot (1921), Le chef dans la grande industrie, Corbeil

== Sources ==
- Cassis, Youssef (1999), Big Business: The European Experience in the Twentieth Century, Oxford University Press, ISBN 978-0-19-829606-5
- Daele, Jasmien van (2010), ILO Histories: Essays on the International Labour Organization and Its Impact on the World During the Twentieth Century, Peter Lang, ISBN 978-3-0343-0516-7
- Fraboulet, Danièle (2007), Quand les patrons s'organisent: Stratégies et pratiques de l'UIMM 1901-1950 (in French), Presses Univ. Septentrion, ISBN 978-2-85939-994-8
- Friedman, Gerald (1998), State-making and Labor Movements: France and the United States, 1876-1914, Cornell University Press, ISBN 0-8014-2325-2
- Horne, Janet R. (2002-01-11), A Social Laboratory for Modern France: The Musée Social and the Rise of the Welfare State, Duke University Press, ISBN 0-8223-2792-9
- Kuisel, Richard F. (1983-04-29), Capitalism and the State in Modern France: Renovation and Economic Management in the Twentieth Century, CUP Archive, ISBN 978-0-521-27378-7
- Maier, Charles S. (2015-10-27), Recasting Bourgeois Europe: Stabilization in France, Germany, and Italy in the Decade after World War I, Princeton University Press, ISBN 978-1-4008-7370-8
- McDougall, Walter A. (2015-03-08), France's Rhineland Policy, 1914-1924: The Last Bid for a Balance of Power in Europe, Princeton University Press, ISBN 978-1-4008-7021-9
- "Notice biographique" (PDF), Revue de la métallurgie, May 1926
- "Pinot, Robert", Patrons de France (in French)
- Savoye, Antoine (1988), "Paul de Rousiers, sociologue et praticien du syndicalisme", Cahiers Georges Sorel (in French), 6 (1): 52–77, doi:10.3406/mcm.1988.959
- Schmidt, Royal J. (2012-12-06), Versailles and the Ruhr: Seedbed of World War II, Springer, ISBN 978-94-015-1081-3
- Stone, Judith F. (1985), The Search for Social Peace: Reform Legislation in France, 1890–1914, SUNY Press, ISBN 978-0-88706-022-9
