= Marianne Debouzy =

French historian (1929–2021)

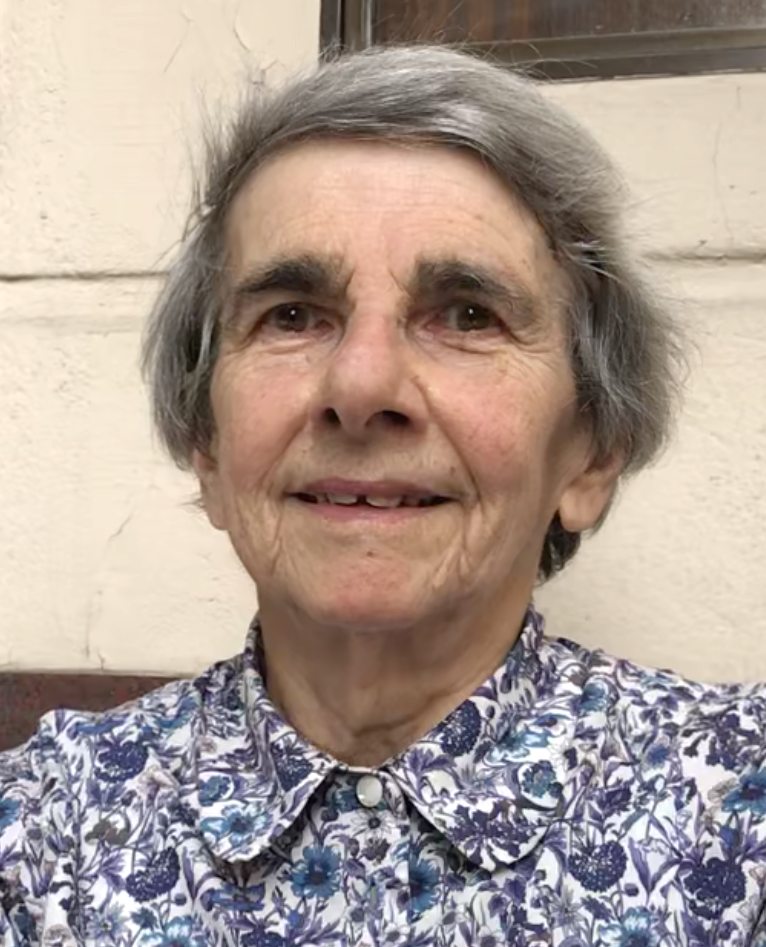
- Born: Marianne Bella Lehmann; 5 December 1929; 16th arrondissement of Paris, France
- Died: 20 June 2021 (aged 91); 5th arrondissement of Paris, France
- Occupation: Historian

Marianne Debouzy (5 December 1929 – 20 June 2021), born Marianne Bella Lehmann, was a French historian who specialized in American history.

== Biography ==
Debouzy was born into a Jewish family in Paris in 1929. After World War II, the family decided to change their surname to Lalande to avoid anti-Semitism.

=== Early life and family ===
Before the war, Debouzy grew up in the 16th arrondissement of Paris with her father Louis Lehmann, sales manager for a waxed canvas company, her mother, Hélène (née Cahen), who ran a leather goods store, and her two sisters.

Debouzy is the mother of business lawyer Olivier Debouzy.

=== Escaping the Nazis ===
After the defeat, the Lehmann family moved to Lyon, where the father continued to work for Gillet at the company's headquarters. "We stayed in this city until January 1943, and many friends and family members joined us. We were constantly worried about the rumors of roundups [...]. We were very worried about those who had remained in the occupied zone: two of my mother's cousins were arrested in the roundup of notables that took place in Paris in December 1941. They were deported and murdered.

=== Resistance ===
In 1942, Debouzy's father hid a liaison officer from the British secret service Special Operations Executive and allowed him to send out radio messages. The English spy, whose real name was Brian Stonehouse, was arrested and deported to the Struthof, Mauthausen and Dachau camps, but managed to survive.

=== The escape ===
After the German invasion of the southern zone, Debouzy's father lost his job and decided to leave the city. Several options were considered, including taking refuge in Dieulefit where, according to information from a pastor in Lyon, Protestants were hiding Jews. This option was rejected, however, as the fear of denunciation in a small village was great. Moreover, Louis Lehmann wanted to make himself "useful and not hide away waiting for the Liberation", explained Debouzy. Despite having affidavits sent to them by cousins living in the United States, which could have enabled them to join them, his father decided to go to England via Spain. Once in Spain, the aim was to ask the British consulate to let them pass to England in exchange for the help he had given to the Special Operations Executive.

=== The journey ===
Debouzy's father made meticulous preparations for the trip. He enlisted the help of his acquaintances to set up the project, in particular Monsieur Brunet, mayor of Saint-Laurent-de-Cerdans, who helped him find a smuggler. A doctor, Henri Berger, with whose family the Lehmanns had befriended during a vacation in Val-d'Isère in 1938, provided them with false identity cards in the name of "Lemoine", as well as a medical certificate attesting that Debouzy's mother needed to take the waters at Amélie-les-Bains (a town located in the then forbidden border zone) to treat her rheumatism. A former employee of Hélène, who had married a Spaniard and was living in Barcelona, took his daughters and wife for a walk in the Parc de la Tête-d'Or, to prepare them for the long journey ahead.

In January 1943, the Lehmann family took the train to Perpignan: "My mother, sisters and I on one side, and my father on the other. A bus then took us to Amélie-les-Bains. We spent one night there, before a van came to pick us up. When we reached a village, the locals explained that, since Vichy took a dim view of public balls, they went dancing every Sunday at an inn on the other side of the border, and would be taking us with them. So on Sunday, we set off across the mountain with the villagers. We layered on as many clothes as we could. On the way, we passed two German army sentries, but they didn't ask any questions and let us pass. The villagers led us to a ruined house, where a smuggler arrived a little later. We followed her through the night along the smuggling paths. Then a man took her place. We walked for several hours without a hitch, except for a negotiation between my father and the second smuggler, who demanded more money than the sum initially agreed, arguing that he had to pay the cab that was to pick us up. My father stood firm and told him he'd pay him once we'd reached our destination. The ferryman finally agreed to this arrangement. And so, in the early hours of the morning, we reached a dry riverbed. The ferryman told us to wait there for the cab he had booked, then took his leave after collecting his money. Eventually, a cab arrived."

=== Spain ===
In Barcelona, Debouzy's father went to the British consulate and managed to prove that he had indeed helped an English soldier. The consul agreed to send him to England, but without his family, which he refused. Marianne explains: "We had managed to flee Vichy, but our situation was not brilliant: our resources had entirely disappeared. My father had tried in Lyon to secure a sum in pesetas in Spain, but the man who should have provided it was in prison. We spent a few weeks in a boarding house in the city, then my parents moved in with other refugees in the French hospital, while my sisters and I were taken in by a French family from the city, the Hayems." Life goes on. Marianne Debouzy recalls: "I went with my sisters to the French lycée, while my mother mended the refugees' clothes and my father became a prison visitor. That's how he met up with one of his brothers-in-law, who had been arrested after crossing the border like us. We had to check in at the police station every week, and the Spanish government was very embarrassed by our presence, as it was by that of all the French refugees. In Spain, however, nobody cared whether we were Jewish or not, and anti-Semitism was not rife."

=== Portugal ===
In June 1943, the family left in a convoy of French refugees organized by Spain and bound for Lisbon. Debouzy remembers an "absolutely extraordinary journey, (...) our train [being] accompanied by the 'hurrahs' of the Portuguese, who were very Anglophile."

The father reached London and joined the Free French Forces, while the family ended up in Algiers.

== Academic path and work ==
=== Academic path ===
Debouzy earned a degree in English from the Sorbonne in 1949 and subsequently studied in the United States for two years (one year at Bryn Mawr College and one at Yale.)

She then worked as a research assistant at the University of Lille from 1956 to 1969, specializing in American studies. In 1969, she defended her doctoral thesis. That same year, she became one of the first professors in the history department at the University of Paris VIII, where she taught American social history until 1998. In 1971, she first contributed to the journal Le Mouvement social.

=== Scope of study ===
==== The American working class ====
Debouzy was inspired by the working-class cultural revival in the United States in the 1960s. She closely followed the history of the American working class, taking up subjects sparsely studied in France since researchers Pierre Émile Levasseur and Louis Vigouroux. Her work particularly related to uprisings and strikes in 1877, which questioned "the image of a revolutionary French working class since 1789 and of an American working class, docile and always having made a pact with capitalism".

==== "Americanization" of French culture ====
Debouzy is also interested in the relationship between the American ruling class and the working class or the "Americanization" of French culture, and the influence of American mass culture in Europe and the rest of the world.

==== "Wild" capitalism ====
Alongside this work, Debouzy also examined the American ruling class in her book Le Capitalisme "sauvage" aux États-Unis, 1860-1900, published in 1972. She studies the tycoons (the Rockefellers, Carnegies, Vanderbilts and Morgans) who consolidated their domination not only through American "exceptionalism", but also through the exploitation of the American working class.

"With the spotlight on their energy, patriotism, ability to generate wealth and thus jobs, and even philanthropy, rather than on their lack of scruples, cynicism, thirst for domination, hatred of the weak, etc., Marianne Debouzy's book "scratches away the heroic crust that covered these portraits and takes a hard look at these characters, not to blacken them, but to find out through them" what social and economic forces are at work. In her book, Marianne Debouzy "scratches away the heroic crust that covered these portraits and looks these characters squarely in the face, not to blacken them but to seek through them 'what social and economic forces were at work in American society between the Civil War and the beginning of the twentieth century', what was the real role of the 'ruling class' of the time, how it acted on the other classes and transmitted to them what the author calls the 'pecuniary culture'".

==== The barbie doll ====
In La poupée Barbie, Debouzy analyzes how the Barbie doll, invented in 1955, marks a break in the social norms associated with childhood and the socialization of young girls: the Barbie doll replaces a child doll with a woman doll.

==== McDonald's or the Americanization of work ====
In Working for McDonald's, France: Resistance to the Americanization of Work,

=== Commitments ===
Opposed to the Algerian war, in 1957 Debouzy helped set up the Maurice-Audin committee, whose historian Pierre Vidal-Naquet uncovered the real conditions of the death of the assistant at the Algiers Faculty of Science who died under torture. Meetings were held at the home of Marianne Debouzy's parents, who helped publish the magazine Vérité-Liberté. In the Audin Committee, she joins other intellectuals mobilized against war and torture, including Luc Montagnier, Michel Crouzet, Jacques Panijel and Laurent Schwartz, participating in "the revolt of universities against the government's use of torture", according to the latter's article in L'Express.

Their participation in this struggle led to reprisals by the OAS, who placed a charge of explosives outside their apartment in October 1961. The explosion caused material damage but no injuries.

She was also a member of the Comité de vigilance face aux usages publics de l'histoire.

Debouzy died in the 5th arrondissement of Paris on 20 June 2021 at the age of 91.

== Works ==
- Travail et travailleurs aux États-Unis (1984)
- A l'ombre de la statue de la liberté : immigrants et ouvriers dans la République américaine 1880-1920 (1988)
- La Classe ouvrière dans l'histoire américaine (1989)
- Le Capitalisme « sauvage » aux États-Unis, 1860-1900 (1991)
- La poupée Barbie, Clio. Femmes, Genre, Histoire, No. 4, Le temps des jeunes filles (1996), pp. 239-256 (18 pages)
- Le monde du travail aux États-Unis : Les temps difficiles (1980-2005) (2009)
- Désobéissance civile aux États-Unis et en France (2016)

2023 sortie du film barbie qui a beaucoup fait parler les internautes
