= La Politique naturelle =

1937 preface and concept by Charles Maurras

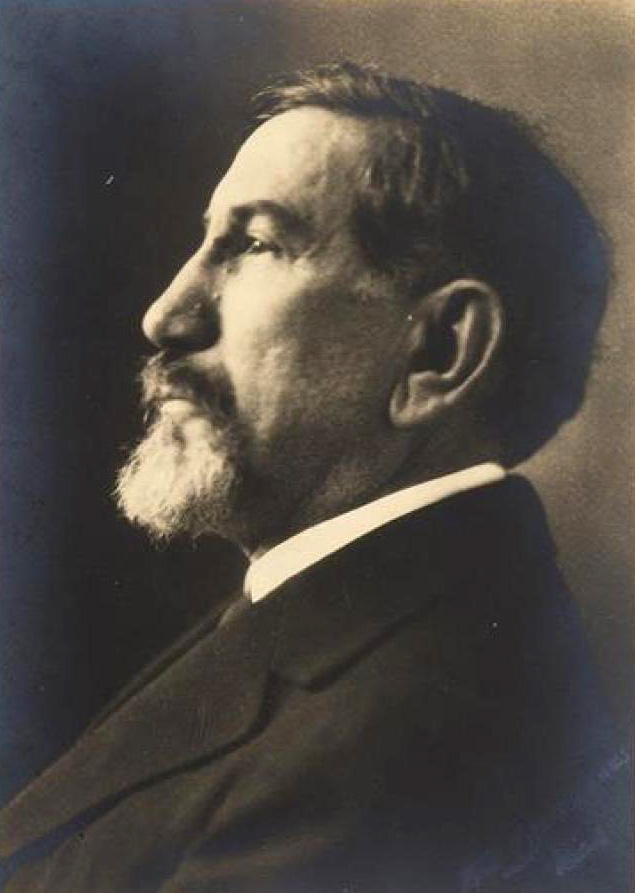
Charles Maurras (1868–1952), author of La Politique naturelle.

La Politique naturelle is the title of the preface given by Charles Maurras in 1937 to his book Mes idées politiques, and the conceptual core of Maurrassian anthropology.

== Definition ==
The text opens with the apologue of the birth of a chick.

The little chick breaks its shell and starts running.

Maurras insists that the chick can very quickly exclaim "I am free". Conversely, the little man "can do nothing without the help of other men who, for years, will make him grow in different circles of life, the largest of which, but which remains concrete, accessible, alive, is that the nation" as summarized by Jean-Christophe Buisson. This example therefore serves to develop a rigorous analysis of the human condition. Maurras seems to be inspired in this by The Essential Constitution of Humanity by Frédéric Le Play written in 1881 which used the example of a bee.

On leaving its native envelope, the young bee, guided by instinct, takes flight and without hesitation undertakes the harvest necessary for the community. It is not the same for man. The child remains unable to support himself for a long time. He is not only useless to his family; he is both a burden and a hindrance to his natural community: for he brings to it, from his birth, the seeds of indiscipline and revolt.

== Rationalism and anti-rationalism ==
All Maurrassian anthropology is based on these common sense observations, placing the individual back in concrete reality: that of a social cell (the family) and of a temporality (man is not born adult, independent, and free). The relationship between the child and his family is one-way, the child has neither freedom nor power, the group in which he participates gives him everything. This group is, necessarily, unequal. The child is not bound to his family by any contract, since he lacks reason. The foundation of any society lies in this gratuitous relationship of authority and protection of the group over the child, a relationship that would be ineffective if it were egalitarian and free. There is therefore neither freedom nor equality at birth according to Maurras. It is only thanks to this order (which like all orders is differentiated) that the child can grow in body and mind. It follows that man is above all an heir: he receives a language, a spiritual heritage, an education, an apprenticeship. He is also a debtor: above all he has duties. This is what Maurras sums up as "protective inequality" in opposition to Rousseauist ideas that men are born "free and equal in rights".

The philosopher Philippe Nemo observes the simultaneous presence of rationalism and anti-rationalism in the thought of Maurras, as in those of Nietzsche or Bergson.

Maurras recognizes the role of intuition, of feeling, of arbitrariness which excludes discussion and decides for sure, and in this he opposes the tradition of the Enlightenment. However, he feels that reason must come later to confirm what sentiment has discovered; that, moreover, science can give solid arguments in favor of natural politics, which instinct must first grasp; that finally, on the tactical level, it is important not to abandon intelligence to the rationalist-republican camp.

Through natural politics, Maurras refutes the main liberal and democratic dogmas: individualism, egalitarism, contractualism. Maurras opposes the notion of heredity to the ideals of freedom and equality.

== The relation to freedom ==
According to Maurras, the existence of a general identity of the human race does not prevent each man from having his own character (which implies a certain freedom). The association between men arises precisely from the diversity (therefore from the inequality) between them that this freedom implies. However, man may be free, but he is a citizen who never acts alone: he must take into account the other members of the social group. Thus, freedom is not an abstract, indefinite principle; it has limits (evil, death, etc.) and must take on its meaning in relation to the social nature of man (hierarchical, unequal). Freedom must be considered in relation to authority, be finalized. Its end, in the social domain, is the common good. This definition goes against the liberalism which, on the contrary, postulates freedom as an end in itself, without defining it. On the contrary, for Maurras: "freedom is not at the beginning, but at the end. It is not at the root, but at the flowers and fruits of human nature, or better said of human virtue. We are freer in proportion as we are better. You have to become it". This definition is similar to that of the Catholic church.

== The natural order ==
For Maurras, there is fundamentally a natural order that opposes the individual freedom of liberals, and it is this that is opposed by "literary intelligence" in L'Avenir de l'intelligence. Conversely, all true politics must rest on the solid and indisputable foundation of nature, it must be "natural politics".

For Maurras, the Counter-Revolution must take place:

[...] in the name of reason and nature, in accordance with the old laws of the universe, for the salvation of order, for the duration and progress of a threatened civilization.

—

If man and society depend on nature, the basic assumption of liberal democracy, that "sovereign" individuals would build, by free choice, the state, society, thought, is ridiculous. Nothing will do:

[...] that it is in the power of the little man to elect his mum and dad, nor that his freedom, however sovereign it may be, can choose the location of his cradle. This point settles everything. Neither Kant nor Plato do anything about it. Their past life inventions are worthless here. Willingly or unwillingly, we must admit these natural territories, neither desired, nor elected, nor eligible, while recognizing the possible designation.

—

== Reception ==
When Mes idées politiques was published, Robert Brasillach takes the opportunity to recall that the natural policy of Maurras is opposed to the ideology of the Lumières and, in particular, to Rousseau:

This Politique naturelle [...] is an Anti-Social Contract, and please heaven that as many good and just reflections are born from it as there are harmful and wrong ones...

Pierre Pujo regards La Politique naturelle as a "magisterial text of political philosophy".

== Links ==
- Full text of La Politique naturelle (1937) on maurras.net
