= My Political Ideas =

1937 book by Charles Maurras

Mes idées politiques
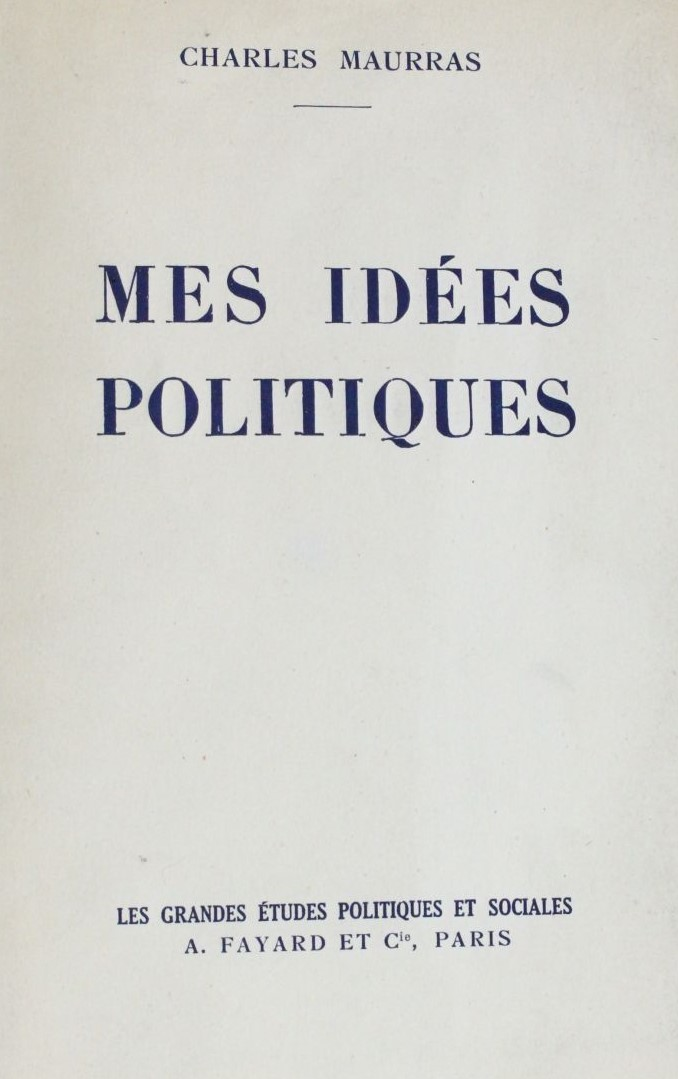
- Editor: Fayard
- Author: Charles Maurras
- Language: French
- Series: Les grandes études politiques et sociales
- Publication date: 1937
- Publication place: France
- Pages: 400
- Text: Mes idées politiques at Internet Archive

Mes idées politiques (My political ideas) is an anthology of articles written by the journalist and French politician Charles Maurras, director of Action Française, and was published in 1937.

The book was composed during Maurras's detention in La Santé Prison from October 29, 1936 to July 6, 1937 for death threats against Léon Blum. The text was compiled by Pierre Chardon, pseudonym of Rachel Legros, former mistress of Maurras in the 1910s. Legros began to compile several articles of Maurras's articles in order to synthesize his thought. According to the specialist Stéphane Giocanti, it is a "true scrapbook of Maurras's political ideas".

== Presentation ==
Although anti-doctrinaire and basing his thought on the experience of reality and "common sense", Charles Maurras consented in 1937, most of his career already behind him, to the writing of a work summarizing his various political positions. Most of the texts of My Political Ideas are taken from former publications of Charles Maurras, particularly in the journal of Action Française, corrected and ordered by their author in order to offer the reader a global and coherent vision of his thought, and this deprived of any reference to current events in order to give the original texts a more general scope. To this corpus, Charles Maurras adds an original introduction called "La politique naturelle" which constitutes, by its defense of the principle of hierarchy and "beneficial inequality", an approach to the whole of the author's work.

Pierre Chardon recounts the conception of the book in the newspaper Action française in 1938.

=== Preface ===
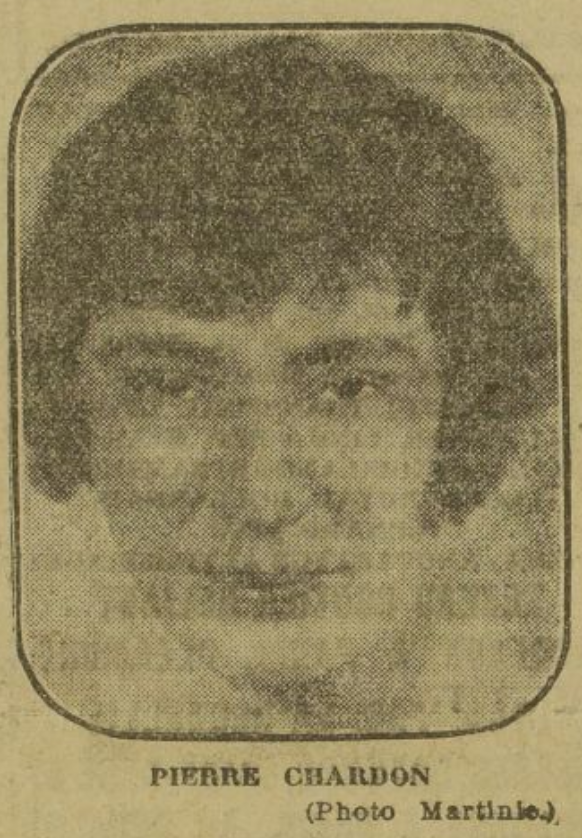
Rachel Legros (1890-1984), nicknamed Pierre Chardon, was the mistress of Charles Maurras and at the origin of Mes idées politiques.

The preface entitled La Politique naturelle is one of the most important texts by Charles Maurras. In this text, the author develops his anthropology against the individualist principles of 1789 : “men are not born free, but entirely dependent on their family and more generally on their society; they become more or less free thereafter, but always relying on this benevolent natural substrate, which Le Play called "the essential constitution of humanity". In Maurras, individuals are not born equal either apart from the natural gifts of reason, moral sense and the aptitude for freedom. Moreover, Maurras refutes the idea of an opposition between nature and man because society would be the nature of man. Society is supposed to be based on a natural anthropology, starting with heredity, which designates "less the transmission of genes than that of a material (house, land, business) and immaterial (language, customs, principles, values, tastes, heritage memory)". Maurras subscribes to Aristotelian-Thomist realism and thinks that politics must therefore be based on natural law.

The social question also holds a large place in this preface because it was composed at the time of the Popular Front. Maurras condemns individualistic idealisms of liberal and socialist inspiration. The class struggle is pejoratively criticized on the grounds that everyone would come out as a loser. Maurras opposes class collaboration taking the form of a corporatist regime. In the first edition of the work, Maurras did not hide his admiration for Mussolini and his reforms. The three pages to the glory of fascism were removed from his Oeuvres capitales (1954) when Maurras quickly noted the abuses committed by fascism at the level of the cult of the State in his book Vergers sur la mer also published in 1937. However, Maurras did not revise the anti-Semitic passages of Mes idées politiques because his state anti-Semitism continued until the end of his life.

=== Plan ===
==== Part One: The Man ====
His vision of man is opposed as much to the optimism of the Enlightenment as to the pessimism of Hobbes, even if he readily admits that "A man is a wolf to another man".

There is a great deal of truth in the discourse of the pessimists who outbid Hobbes and his followers in this way. I would like us to resign ourselves to admitting everything they say as certain, and not to be afraid to teach that indeed man for man is more than a wolf; but on the condition of correcting the aphorism by adding to it this new aphorism, and of equally rigorous truth, that for man man is a god.

— Charles Maurras, Mes idées politiques

For historian Martin Motte, Charles Maurras approaches the "unsociable truth" of Kant and delivers his own version of the Hegelian dialectic of master and slave.

==== Part Two: Principles ====
Maurras appends "politics to an ontology of finitude" and conceives "the heritage of the past only under the benefit of an inventory".

True tradition is critical, and without these distinctions the past is useless, its successes ceasing to be examples, its reverses ceasing to be lessons.

— Charles Maurras, Mes idées politiques

==== Part Three: Civilization ====
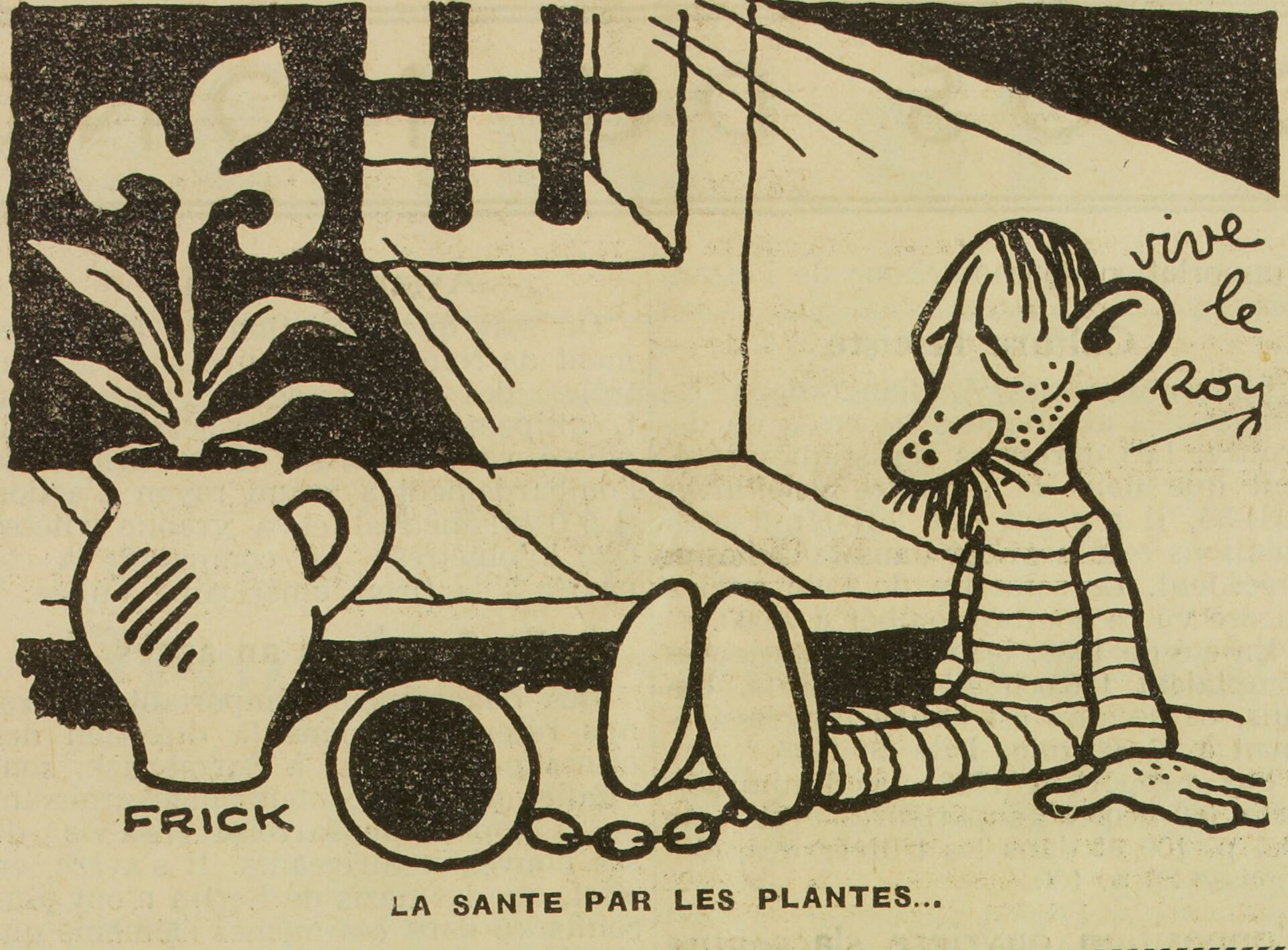
Caricature of Maurras in prison while writing Mes idées politiques published in Vendredi, June 12th, 1936

The author delimits civilization to a strictly Greco-Latin framework and criticizes both declinism and fatalism.

==== Part Four: Political Science ====
Maurras delivers "a nuanced reflection on the relationship of politics and biology" and rejects the dogmatic application of biology to social and political relationships. However, he tolerates a "heuristic use of this science" by invoking many analogies. Using organizing empiricism, he deduces immutable political laws. Maurras borrows from Montesquieu his definition of the law as "a relation flowing from the nature of things".

==== Part Five: Democracy ====
The author relies on the four Confederate States (Jewish, Protestant, Freemason and Moth) for his critique of democracy. He also refers to Plato's Laws and Republic when he uses ontological categories.

[...] democracy is evil, democracy is death.

— Charles Maurras, Mes idées politiques

Maurras depicts democracy "as an entropic regime, consumer of civilization and focus of barbarism" as he did earlier in Anthinea.

==== Part Six: Social Issues ====
In this part, Maurras tolerates state interventionism in the regulation of socio-economic relations but rejects the idea of a welfare state perceived as draconian. Martin Motte notes that for Maurras "social mobility has always existed in the history of France and constitutes a natural movement: it is therefore useless to make it a political priority". In parallel, Maurras criticizes bourgeois selfishness.

==== Part Seven: Back to Living Things ====
In conclusion, Maurras delivers his definition of the nation. Maurras takes care to recognize in it the spiritual prerogatives of the Catholic Church.

The idea of nation is not a "cloud" as the anarchist cranks say, it is the representation in abstract terms of a strong reality. The nation is the largest community circle that is temporally solid and complete. Break it, and you strip the individual. He will lose all his defence, all his support, all his support.

— Charles Maurras, Mes idées politiques

Finally, Maurras recalls that the French nation is not a matter of race, that it is not hermetic to possible external influences, while specifying that diversity can be as much a source of wealth as of division. The Monarchy is erected as the means to preserve the cohesion of the nation.

== Bibliography ==
- Cédric Milhat (2003). "Libertés, inégalité, autorité. Sur Mes idées politiques de Charles Maurras". Politeia (3). Université Montesquieu-Bordeaux IV: 331–335.
