= Paul de Rousiers =

French economist

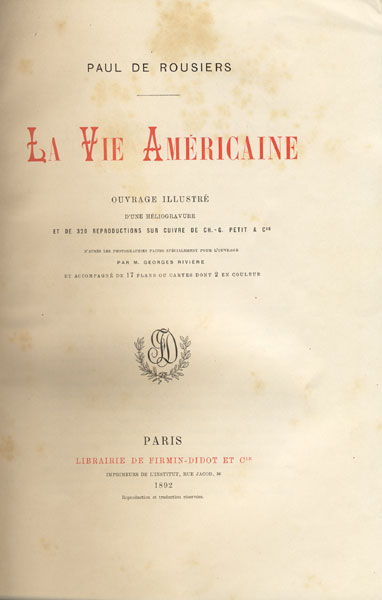
- Frontispiece of La Vie Americaine (1892)
- Born: 16 January 1857; Rochechouart, Haute-Vienne, France
- Died: 28 March 1934 (aged 77)

Academic background
- Influences: Pierre Guillaume Frédéric le Play

Paul de Rousiers (French pronunciation: [pɔl də ʁuzje]; 16 January 1857 – 28 March 1934) was a French social economist and industrial lobbyist. He was a follower of Pierre Guillaume Frédéric le Play, and believed in industrial syndicates that would be independent of both workers and owners, and would be dedicated to the progress of their industries. He undertook studies of society and economic organization in the United States, Britain and Germany, where he visited the rural areas, towns, cities, farms, mines and factories, and spoke to workers, owners, politicians and intellectuals to gain an understanding of the interplay of social and economic forces. His work gained him considerable respect.

In 1903 Paul de Rousiers became secretary-general of the French shipowners' association, a position he held for most of the rest of his life. In this role he proved a highly effective lobbyist. He also provided valuable information and legal services to the members, and helped in their negotiations with trade unions. He remained involved in social economics, and taught a course at the École libre des sciences politiques. Paul de Rousiers was a prolific author throughout his career, publishing many books and articles.

== Life ==
=== Early years ===
Marie Pierre Paul de Rousiers was born in Rochechouart, Haute-Vienne, on 16 January 1857. His father, a graduate of the naval school, was an officer in the navy and owned an agricultural estate in Rhus, in the commune of Saint-Maurice-des-Lions, where Les Rousiers had lived for several generations. This is where Paul spent his childhood. After the death of his father in 1865 he entered the Jesuit college in Poitiers and obtained his baccalauréat in 1872. He then prepared for the examination for admission to the Naval School in Brest, which he failed twice.

De Rousiers turned to the study of the law at the Catholic Institute in Paris. His professor of political economy, Claudio Jannet, was a disciple of Pierre Guillaume Frédéric le Play, head of the Société d'économie sociale and the Unions de la paix sociale. De Rousiers met Le Play through Edmond Demolins, through whom he joined the group that met in Le Play's salon every Monday. De Rousiers pursued his study of law and obtained a license, and also worked in 1877 as chief of staff to the prefect of Aveyron, while continuing to study social science. His theoretical apprenticeship ended with the publication in 1881 of the Programme de gouvernement et d'organisation sociale d'après l'observation comparée des divers peuples, with a preface by Le Play. This was a collective work by the small group led by Demolins.

=== Social economist ===
Paul de Rousiers married Camille d'Artigues in May 1879. He joined the Société d'économie sociale and the Unions de la paix sociale, and from this time was committed to development of social science. From 1883 he became a regular contributor to Réforme sociale, a bi-monthly journal edited by Demolins. The term "social geography" was first used both by geographer Élisée Reclus and by sociologists of the Le Play School, perhaps independently. The first proven occurrence of the term derives from a review of Reclus' Nouvelle géographie universelle from 1884, written by Paul de Rousiers, a member of the Le Play School. In 1885, three years after the death of Le Play, Henri de Tourville and Demolins split from the movement and founded a new journal, Science sociale. They brought with them a few adherents including de Rousiers and Robert Pinot (1862–1926), future director of the Musée social and secretary-general of the Comité des forges. De Rousiers continued to work within this small group, which functioned as a true research team.

The publisher Firmin-Didot provided funding for Paul de Rousiers to visit the United States from March to June 1890. He wrote of what he found in La Vie américaine (1892), an analysis of American society based on deliberate investigation including visits to factories and farms, observations of life in the cities and countryside, and interviews with representatives of different social groups including owners, workers, politicians, officials and professionals. His goal was to understand the sociological forces behind the growing economic power of the US, which was starting to cause serious concern in Europe. De Rousiers interviewed George Pullman, who exerted huge control over the workforce who lived in his Pullman City. He wrote of Pullman's manufacturing complex, "Everything is done in order and with precision. One feels that some brain of superior intelligence, backed by a long technical experience, has thought out every possible detail." The book appeared in English in 1892, translated by the geographer Andrew John Herbertson.

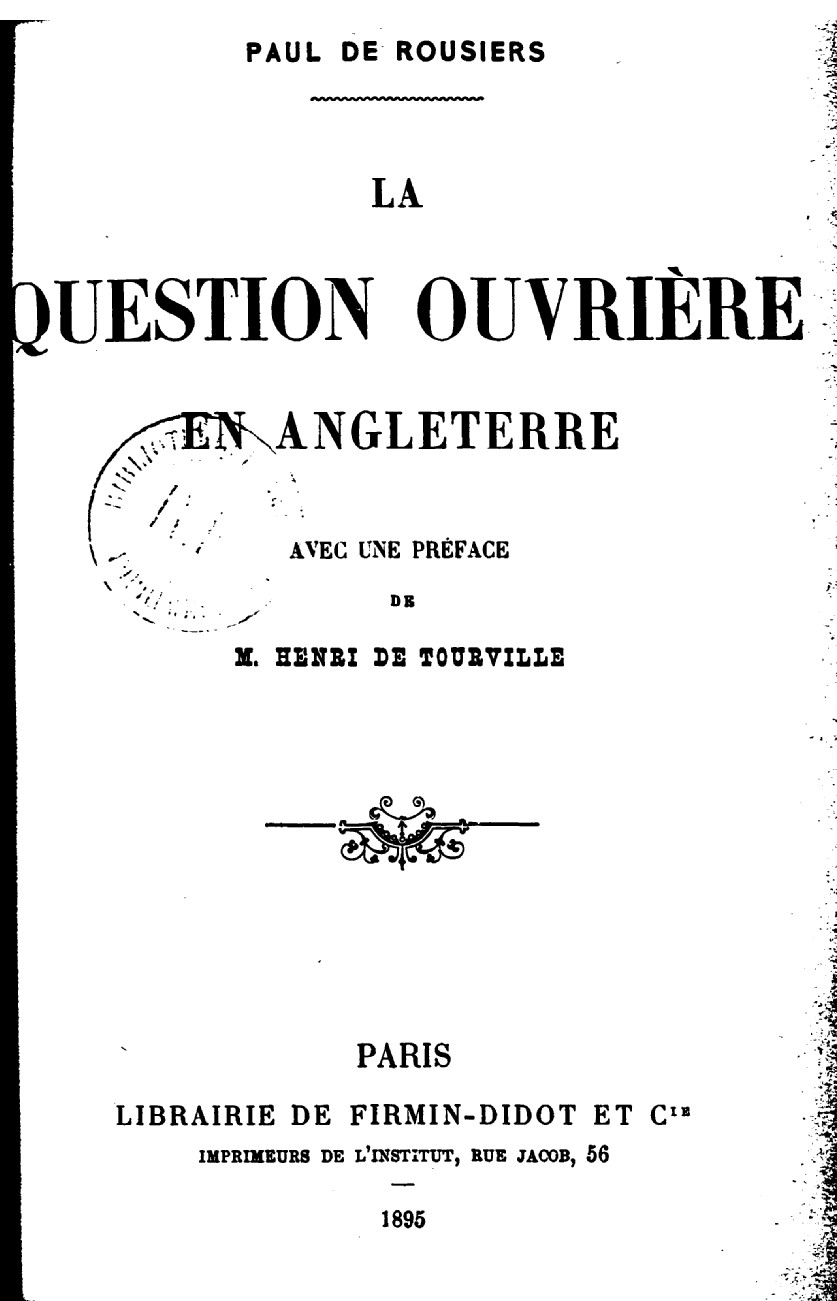
Frontispiece of La question ouvrière en Angleterre (1895)

In 1893 de Rousiers made two visits of four months to England and Scotland, then to Belfast, where in September 1893 he participated in a trade union congress. As in America, he made many observations, particularly in Birmingham, London and the Scottish Lothians, visited factories and mines, and interviewed workers, industrialists, union leaders and intellectuals such as Sidney Webb. Based his investigation he produced a major work on La question ouvrière en Angleterre (1895), translated as The Labour Question in Britain (1896).

Le Trade-unionisme en Angleterre (1896) was a collective work that Paul de Rousiers organized at the request of the directors of the Musée social. Robert Pinot, the effective leader of the Musée and a close friend of de Rousiers, had placed him at the head of a team of four pupils of the École Libre des Sciences Politiques who conducted inquiries in September and October 1895. The Musée social supported a second study on the same subject in the US from July to December 1896. De Rousiers led a team that included F. de Carbonnel, Pierre Claudio-Jannet and Louis Vigouroux. This resulted in several articles and two books, La Concentration des forces ouvrières dans l'Amérique du Nord by Vigouroux and Les Industries monopolisées (trusts) aux Etats-Unis by de Rousiers.

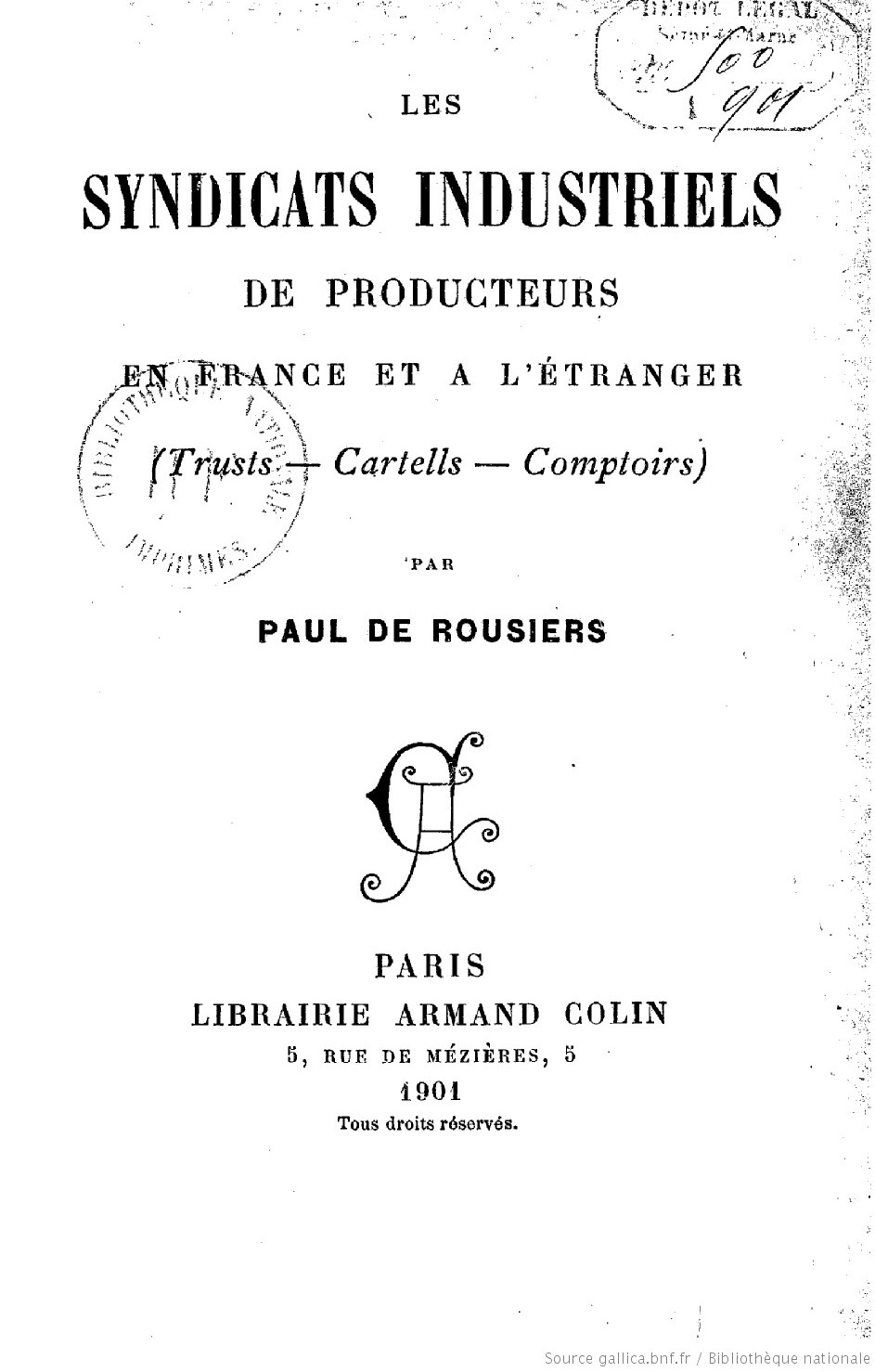
Frontispiece of Les Syndicats industriels de producteurs en France et à l'étranger (1901)

After his second visit to the United States Paul de Rousier's reputation was established. He was invited to contribute to reviews such as the Revue politique et parlementaire, Revue de Paris, Revue bleue and Annales des sciences politiques, while continuing to contribute to la Science sociale. In 1899 and 1900 he studied the German cartels in two journeys through the Ruhr, the plains of Saxony and Silesia. He then investigated the Comptoir métallurgique de Longwy, formed in 1877 by the main enterprises of Lorraine to coordinate purchase and allocation of pig iron. Based on this research he published Les Syndicats industriels de producteurs en France et à l'étranger (1901). His last important work about industrial relations was Hambourg et l'Allemagne contemporaine (1902).

=== Lobbyist ===
Édouard Gruner, mining engineer and vice-president of the Comité central des houillères, was an active member of the Société d'économie sociale and secretary-treasurer of the Musée social. He had already introduced Robert Pinot to the metallurgy manufacturers who were looking for a leader for their trade association, and did the same for de Rousiers by putting him in contact with the shipbuilders, who wanted to found a professional association. De Rousiers was engaged in 1903 by André Lebon, former minister of Commerce and then of the Colonies, and first president of the Comité central des armateurs de France (CCAF: Central Committee of French Shipowners). De Rousiers was secretary-general and vice-president-delegate of the committee. He now had stable employment that allowed him to rebuild his family home in Rhus and provide education to his five children. The CCAF was an owners' association typical of the time with the purpose of studying and defending the common interests of the shipowners. Within a year it represented 98% of the industry. De Rousiers quickly established a service to gather French and foreign information, which he described in March 1910,

The information service of the Shipowners' Committee is not conceived in an academic spirit but in a spirit of practical use. We do not intend to constitute a compendium of jurisprudence or a compendium of statistics; We strive to point out to you all that seems likely to have an impact on your industry, anything that threatens your general interests, anything that is of a nature to serve them.

The information service and a legal section both were frequently consulted by the shipowners. With his considerable intellectual authority, de Rousiers was an effective defender of the interests of the shipowners and contributed to discussions on legislative project. At times he was criticized for being too effective in his lobbying. During World War I (1914–18) there was an enforced truce between the shipowners and the labor unions, with the state as mediator. As soon as the armistice was declared the shipowners, led by the committee, reasserted their independence in negotiating wages. De Rousiers justified this position,

Conditions vary according to the region; Working conditions vary according to traffic and categories of vessels. Remuneration also depends on the possibilities of each company. How could it be conceived that, in the midst of a crisis, a professional trade union would be forced, by submitting to such an arbitration procedure, to impose new burdens on all its members which might exceed the limit of what some can bear? It would be a lack of clairvoyance.

In 1923 the Société d'études et d'informations économiques, formed by the Comité des forges, published studies by de Rousiers defending "good" agreements. De Rousiers represented the shipowners in the Standing Joint Committee on Merchant Shipping, established in 1925, which had the purpose of examining issues that could cause conflicts between owner and workers. He also represented the owners on the Joint International Maritime Committee led by Albert Thomas, which sought to establish international status for seafarers. He participated in the International Maritime Conferences organized by the International Labor Office in Genoa (1920) and Geneva (1926), where the main interlocutor was Havelock Wilson of Britain, head of the International Federation of Seafarers' Unions. In 1930, although not a shipowner, de Rousiers was elected vice-president of the Comité central des armateurs.

=== Other activities ===
After the death of Tourville in 1903 and Demolins in 1907 he assumed leadership of the Science sociale group. He also presided over the École des Roches that Demolins had founded which sought to apply the lessons of social science to educational reform. From 1908 he held a seat in economic geography at the École libre des sciences politiques. De Rousiers gave a course on Large Modern Industries at this school.

De Rousiers supervised a major inquiry into French manufacturing in 1915–16, co-directed by Henri Hauser and Henri Hitier, for the National Association of Economic Expansion. He was one of the main rapporteurs of the major inquiry into the merchant marine by an extra-parliamentary committee from 1922 to 1927. He published a five-volume work on Les Grandes Industries modernes (1924–1928). He was appointed to the board of the Musée Social.

Paul de Rousiers died on 28 March 1934. His historical monograph on his own family, Une Famille de hobereaux pendant six siècles appeared after his death. His name was given to the general cargo ship Paul de Rousiers, built in 1942 by the Chantiers de Provence in Port-de-Bouc.

== Theories ==
In La Vie américaine Paul de Rousiers distinguished the west, with its ranches, farms and towns that were no more than farm markets, from the east with its manufactures, commerce and city life. He saw them as two successive states of the same society, with the west helping to explain the east. De Rousiers, who inspired the revolutionary syndicalist Georges Sorel with this work, wrote that the American aristocracy stressed ability and discouraged mediocrity, even among their own children. They were much more concerned with helping those with ability than with preventing the incompetent from dying of hunger. He wrote that every American feels himself capable of trying his luck on the battlefield of business, so that the general spirit of the country is in complete harmony with that of the millionaires.

In his 1898 Les Industries monopolisées (trusts) aux Etats-Unis Paul de Rousiers noted that Americans at the time were too easily persuaded that monopolies must bring large benefits, although the whiskey and rope trusts had been short-lived and the sugar trust depended on protective tariffs and high payments to politicians. He thought that the German cartels and American trusts were similar and were designed to avoid lowering prices due to overproduction. He wrote that when several producers realized their common interests they would inevitably form a highly disciplined association that would defend their interests as long as they followed its instructions. He contrasted the German cartel to the American trust, writing,

The former is a league of allies in which each one preserves a certain liberty of action, but forbids himself the usage of certain weapons against the others. It represents a temperament more or less brought out in the economic struggle. On the other hand, the trust is the result of a struggle to the death. One is the German solution, the other the American solution of a problem posed in Germany as in America by the industrial system. ... These two solutions are as different from each other as the economic, social, and political conditions of the German empire are different from the economic, political, and social conditions of the American republic. They are not of the same nature.

In La question ouvrière en Angleterre (1895) de Rousiers describes a process common to all economically advanced societies of constant advances in mechanization, changes in industrial job requirements and changes to markets, and examines how the different branches of industry are affected by the changes, and how the workers react. While he was in Britain there was a miners' strike. In the conclusion of his work he outlines a concept of syndicalism, with organizations independent of workers and owners that would favor the evolution of industry and solve the "labor question". The way in which the strike was resolved through a conciliation board chaired by a third party seemed to him to foreshadow this new approach. In Les Syndicats industriels de producteurs en France et à l'étranger (1901) de Rousiers commented favorably on the role of syndicates of manufacturers in regulating the markets, which he saw as beneficial both economically and socially.

Paul de Rousiers was sympathetic to trade unions but thought they should focus on adapting to the constantly evolving industrial economy. He saw danger in their participation in political and ideological struggles, and in development of rigid attitudes and approaches. These themes were repeated and elaborated in Le Trade-unionisme en Angleterre (1896). This book led Georges Sorel to emphasise the importance of the unions in his L'Avenir socialiste des syndicats (1898). In Hambourg et l'Allemagne contemporaine (1902) de Rousiers criticized the German labour movement, which he considered poorly organized and influenced too much by social democracy and the class struggle. He also criticized the owners who, by their paternalism, had hindered formation of autonomous trade unions with an élite of workers capable of directing them.

== Publications ==
Publications by de Rousiers include"

- Paul de Rousiers (1878), Du serment décisoire, Paris: Imp. Saint-Généresus, p. 80
- Paul de Rousiers (1884), Unions de la paix sociale, fondées par F. Le Play ..., Angoulême: A. Debreuil
- Paul de Rousiers (1884), Unions de la paix sociale, fondées par F. Le Play. Unions d'Angoumois, Aunis et Saintonge. L'état social dans la région de Confolens, Angoulême: A. Dubreuil, p. 31
- Paul de Rousiers (1892), La Vie américaine... (in French), Paris: Firmin-Didot, p. 698
- Paul de Rousiers (1892), American life, Translated by A. J. Herbertson, London: Cassell, p. 437
- Paul de Rousiers (1895), La question ouvrière en Angleterre, Preface by Henri de Tourville, Paris: Firmin-Didot, p. 532
- Paul de Rousiers (1896), The Labour Question in Britain, London-New York: Macmillan and Co
- Rousiers, Paul de; Carbonnel, César; Festy, Octave; Fleury, André; Wilhelm, Joseph (1897), Le Trade-Unionisme en Angleterre, par Paul de Rousiers, avec la collaboration de MM. de Carbonnel, Festy, Fleury et Wilhelm, Paris: A. Colin, p. 356
- Paul de Rousiers (1898), L'Oklahoma, Preface by harles Simond, Paris: Plon, p. 32
- Paul de Rousiers (1898), Les industries monopolisées (Trusts) aux États-Unis, Paris: A. Colin et Cie, p. 339
- Paul de Rousiers (1901), Les syndicats industriels de producteurs en France et à l'étranger (trusts, cartells, comptoirs), Paris: A. Colin, p. 290
- Paul de Rousiers (1902), Hambourg et l'Allemagne contemporaine, Paris: A. Colin, p. 324
- Edmond Demolins; Robert Pinot; Paul de Rousiers (1904), "La Méthode sociale, ses procédés et ses applications", La Science Sociale, Paris: bureaux de la revue
- Paul de Rousiers (1907), "La Lutte commerciale actuelle. Les exportations allemandes, leurs origines et leurs répercussions sociales", La Science Sociale, Paris: aux bureaux de la "Science sociale"
- Paul de Rousiers (1909), "Les Solutions violentes", La Science Sociale, Paris: bureaux de la "Science sociale"
- Paul de Rousiers (1909), Les grands ports de France, leur rôle économique, Paris: A. Colin, p. 260
- Paul de Rousiers (1910), "L'Inauguration du monument d'Édouard Demolins", La Science Sociale, Paris: bureaux de la "Science sociale"
- Paul de Rousiers (1910), "Le Rôle et les limites de la science sociale", La Science Sociale, Paris
- Paul de Rousiers (August–September 1910), "I. Conférence sur le projet de création à Londres d'une maison d'étudiants", La Science Sociale, Paris: bureaux de la "Science sociale": 88
- Pierre Bodereau; Maurice de Périgny; Paul de Rousiers; Firmin Roz; André Siegfried (1911), Les questions actuelles de politique étrangère dans l'Amérique du Nord, Paris: Société des anciens élèves et élèves de l'École libre des sciences politiques / F. Alcan, p. 242
- Paul de Rousiers (1912), "La Formation de l'élite dans la société moderne", La Science Sociale, Paris: bureaux de la "Science sociale": 76
- Paul de Rousiers (1912), Les Syndicats industriels de producteurs en France et à l'Étranger. Trusts-Cartells-Comptoirs-Ententes internationales, Paris: Colin
- Camille Bloch; Louis Laffitte; Joseph Letaconnoux; Fernand Maurette; Paul de Rousiers; Paul Vidal de La Blache (1913), Les divisions régionales de la France: leçons faites à l'École des hautes études sociales, Paris: F. Alcan, p. 260
- Paul de Rousiers (1914), L'Élite dans la société moderne, son rôle, Paris: A. Colin, p. 310
- Émile Bourgeois; Pierre-Étienne Flandin; Paul de Rousiers (1916), La guerre, Paris: Association des Sciences po. France / F. Alcan, p. 311
- Paul de Rousiers (1924), La marine marchande, Paris: Société amicale des officiers de l'Ecole d'instruction de la 10e division (Reuilly)
- Paul de Rousiers (1924–1928), Les grandes industries modernes, Paris: A. Colin
- Paul de Rousiers (1926), Rapport sur les récompenses, Orléans: Société centrale de sauvetage des naufragés. France / H. Tessier
- Paul de Rousiers; Clemens Lammers (1927), Summary of legislation on cartels, London: G. Routledge and sons
- Paul de Rousiers (1927), Les cartels et les trusts et leur évolution, Genève: Société des Nations, p. 26
- Paul de Rousiers (1928), L'Amélioration des ports maritimes français, Paris: Association française pour le développement des travaux publics, p. 19
- Paul de Rousiers (July–September 1930), "La situation générale de la marine marchande française", Revue des sciences politiques, 53, Paris: F. Alcan: 321–338
- Paul de Rousiers (1930), "Les facteurs de la vie nationale, l'industrie", Communications et mémoires de l'Académie de marine», 8: 1929, Paris: Société d'éditions géographiques, maritimes et coloniales: 25
- Paul de Rousiers (1934), Une famille de hobereaux pendant six siècles, Paris: Firmin-Didot, p. 276

== Sources ==
- Hardach, G., "La Mobilisation Industrielle", 19141918 L'Autre Front (in French), Editions de l'Atelier, GGKEY:1FJ7TH7RLZ9
- Miller, Donald L. (1997-04-03), City of the Century: The Epic of Chicago and the Making of America, Simon and Schuster, ISBN 978-0-684-83138-1
- Paul de Rousiers (in French), BnF: Bibliotheque nationale de France
- PAUL de ROUSIERS (in French), IUM: Union Industrielle et Maritime
- Savoye, Antoine (1988), "Paul de Rousiers, sociologue et praticien du syndicalisme", Cahiers Georges Sorel (in French), 6 (1): 52–77, doi:10.3406/mcm.1988.959
- Sorel, Georges (1969), The Illusions of Progress, University of California Press, ISBN 978-0-520-02256-0
- Sorel, Georges (1999), Sorel: Reflections on Violence, Cambridge University Press, ISBN 978-0-521-55910-2
- Stanley, John (1981), The Sociology of Virtue: The Political & Social Theories of Georges Sorel, University of California Press, ISBN 978-0-520-03790-8
