= Edmond Demolins =

French pedagogue (1852–1907)

- Born: 1852; Marseille
- Died: 1907 (aged 54–55); Caen
- Known for: École des Roches
- Scientific career
- Fields: Pedagogy

Edmond Demolins (1852–1907) was a French pedagogue.

== Life and work ==
Edmond Demolins was born in 1852 in Marseille. He became a disciple of Pierre Guillaume Frédéric le Play. He formed a small group of students including Paul de Rousiers that met in Le Play's salon every Monday in the 1870s. The Programme de gouvernement et d'organisation sociale d'après l'observation comparée des divers peuples par un groupe d'économistes (1881) was a collective work by members of the group with a preface by Le Play. Demolins edited the bi-monthly Réforme sociale. In 1885, three years after the death of Le Play, Henri de Tourville and Demolins split from the movement and founded a new journal, Science sociale. They brought with them a few adherents including de Rousiers and Robert Pinot (1862–1926), future director of the Musée social and secretary-general of the Comité des forges. This small group functioned as a true research team.

Inspired by the experiences of the Abbotsholme School and the Bedales School, he founded the École des Roches (pioneer of Active learning).

Edmond Demolins died in 1907 in Caen.

His best known works are L’Éducation nouvelle: L’École des Roches and À quoi tient la supériorité des Anglo-Saxons? (1897). In his work Les grandes routes des peuples, essai de géographie sociale : comment la route crée le type social, he defends racist theories.

== Publications ==
- Histoire de France, depuis les premiers temps jusqu'à nos jours d'après les sources et les travaux récents T. 1, Les origines, Paris : Librairie de la Sté Bibliographique, 1879
- Histoire de France, depuis les premiers temps jusqu'à nos jours d'après les sources et les travaux récents T. 2, La monarchie féodale, Paris : Librairie de la Sté Bibliographique, 1879
- Histoire de France, depuis les premiers temps jusqu'à nos jours d'après les sources et les travaux récents T. 3, La monarchie moderne, Paris : Librairie de la Sté Bibliographique, 1880
- Histoire de France, depuis les premiers temps jusqu'à nos jours d'après les sources et les travaux récents T. 4, La Révolution et les monarchies contemporaines, 3me éd, Paris : Librairie de la Sté Bibliographique, 1880
- Le Play et son oeuvre de réforme sociale, 2e éd., Paris : bureaux de la Réforme sociale, 1884
- Comment élever et établir mes enfants?, Paris : Firmin-Didot, 1893
- À quoi tient la supériorité des Anglo-Saxons ?, 1897 (available at Gallica).
- L'Éducation nouvelle : L'École des Roches, 1998 (available at Gallica).
- Les grandes routes des peuples, essai de géographie sociale: Comment la route crée le type social. Paris, Firmin Didot & cie, 1901. (Volume 1 also at Nabu Press, 2010 ISBN 978-1-173-17239-8)
- A-t-on intérêt à s'emparer du Pouvoir ?, Firmin-Didot, 1905, 338 p.
- Les Français d'aujourd'hui - Les types sociaux du Midi et du Centre, Librairie de Paris/Firmin-Didot, s.d.

== Sources ==
- Savoye, Antoine (1988), "Paul de Rousiers, sociologue et praticien du syndicalisme", Cahiers Georges Sorel (in French), 6 (1): 52–77, doi:10.3406/mcm.1988.959
- Taguieff, Pierre-André (2001), The force of prejudice: on racism and its doubles (Contradictions of Modernity), University of Minnesota Press, ISBN 978-0-8166-2373-0
