= Henri Hitier =

French agronomist

- Born: Henri-Joseph-Robert Hitier; 16 June 1864; Revelles, Somme, France
- Died: 1 April 1958 (aged 93); Paris, France
- Occupation: Agronomist

Henri Hitier (16 June 1864 – 1 April 1958) was a French agronomist.

== Family ==
Henri-Joseph-Robert Hitier was born in Revelles, Somme, on 16 June 1864. His parents were Joseph Hitier, Consul-General of France in China, and Augustine Vauchelet (1832–1914). His brother was Joseph Hitier (born in 1865). Joseph became an assistant professor of law at the University of Grenoble and later Professor of Rural Economics at the National Agronomic Institute. Both were also involved in running the family-owned form in Revelles and a pasturage in Bray-lès-Mareuil. Henri married Thérèse Delepouve. They had several children including Jeanne Hitier (1895–1985), who married Adalbert de Chassepot de Pissy (1876–1952).

== Career ==
Between 1885 and 1893 Henri Hitier studied first at the Institut national agronomique and then at the École nationale des Mines. From 1893 to 1935 he taught courses at the Institut national agronomique on rural economics, comparative agriculture and agricultural geography. Hitier was a lecturer at the Institut national agronomique from 1900 to 1935, and from 1911 he was Professor of Comparative Agriculture at the institute.

Henri Hitier and Henri Hauser co-directed a major inquiry into French manufacturing in 1915–16 for the National Association of Economic Expansion. The inquiry was supervised by Paul de Rousiers. From 1930 Hitiere was Professor of Rural Economy at the École des sciences politiques. Hitier became a permanent Secretary of the Académie d'agriculture. Henri Hitier' died in the 1st arrondissement of Paris on 1 April 1958.

== Work ==
Hitier mainly worked in the field of agronomy. He undertook systematic surveys of France's natural agricultural regions, and then those of other geographic regions in Central and Western Europe and North Africa. He showed that there were links between the geological formations and the agricultural systems. He worked on developing farming practices that would give the most efficient yield, including rational crop management based on soil and climate, and the careful choice of methods of agriculture and use of fertilizer.

== Publications ==
Publications by Henri Hitier include:

- Henri Hitier (1889), "Gisements de phosphate de chaux du terrain crétacé dans le nord de la France", Annales de la science agronomique française et étrangère, I, Nancy: impr. de Berger-Levrault
- Henri Hitier (1891), "Étude sur l'utilisation des tourbes françaises en agriculture", Annales de l'Institut national agronomique, XII, Nancy: impr. de Berger-Levrault
- Henri Hitier (1904), Culture de la betterave, choix des sols, des graines et des méthodes culturales les mieux appropriées à la production la plus économique et la plus rationnelle de la betterave sucrière sous le régime légal créé par la convention de Bruxelles, Paris: Société des agriculteurs de France
- Henri Hitier (1905), G. Wéry (ed.), "Plantes industrielles", Encyclopédie agricole, Introduction by Dr P. Regnard, Paris: J.-B. Baillière et fils
- Henri Hitier; Roger de Saint-Maurice (1913), G. Wéry (ed.), "Plantes industrielles : plantes textiles et plantes oléagineuses", Encyclopédie agricole (2 ed.), Paris: J.-B. Baillière et fils
- Henri Hitier (1916), G. Wéry (ed.), "Plantes sarclées, pomme de terre et betterave", Encyclopédie agricole, Introduction by Dr P. Regnard, Paris: J.-B. Baillière et fils
- Henri Hauser; Henri Hitier (1917), Enquête sur la production française et la concurrence étrangère, Paris: Association nationale d'expansion économique
- Louis Petit; Henri Hitier; Eugène Pluchet; Marcel Vacher (1917), "Communications faites à l'Académie nationale d'agriculture, en sa séance du 13 mai 1914, sur le tracteur-toueur système Georges Filtz", Bulletin de l'Académie nationale d'agriculture, Villeneuve-St-Georges: Union typographique
- Henri Hitier; Joseph Hitier (1918), "L'intervention de l'État dans le domaine agricole", Expansion économique, Paris: Association nationale d'expansion économique
- Henri Hitier; Joseph Hitier (1923), Les problèmes actuels de l'agriculture, Paris: Payot
- Henri Hitier (1925), Henry Sagnier (ed.), L'Exploitation d'un domaine rural (systèmes de culture et assolements), Nouvelle bibliothèque du cultivateur (2 ed.), Paris: Libr. agricole de la Maison rustique
- Henri Hitier (1927), Comment augmenter le rendement en blé à l'hectare, Paris: impr. Chaix
- Henri Hitier; Jean Lefèvre (1941), "Jules Alquier, 1869–1949", Bulletin de la Société scientifique d'hygiène alimentaire et d'alimentation rationnelle de l'homme, XXIX (5–6), Paris
- Henri Hitier (1942), Les Questions agricoles au point de vue économique, Paris: Centre de documentation universitaire
- Henri Hitier (1949), Recherches cytogénétiques sur les tabacs résistants à la mosaïque (Thèses présentées à la Faculté des sciences de Bordeaux pour obtenir le titre d'ingénieur-docteur), Bergerac: impr. de H. Trillaud
- Henri Hitier (1951), "La Production du tabac", Nouvelle encyclopédie agricole, Paris: J.-B. Baillière et fils
- Henri Hitier (1965), Le tabac, Paris: Presses universitaires de France
- Henri Hitier, M. Léauté (ed.), "Les Céréales", Encyclopédie scientifique des aide-mémoire, Paris: Masson

== Sources ==
- Desrochers, Pierre; Shimizu, Hiroko (5 October 2010), "Arguments contre la souveraineté alimentaire et l'agriculture de proximité: essai de synthèse historique", Possibles (in French)
- Henri Hitier (1864–1958) (in French), BnF: Bibliotheque nationale de France
- Institut de France (27 March 2014), HITIER Henri Joseph Robert, CTHS
- Pierfit, Henri HITIER (in French)
- Savoye, Antoine (1988), "Paul de Rousiers, sociologue et praticien du syndicalisme", Cahiers Georges Sorel (in French), 6 (1): 52–77, doi:10.3406/mcm.1988.959
