= André Lebon =

French lawyer and politician

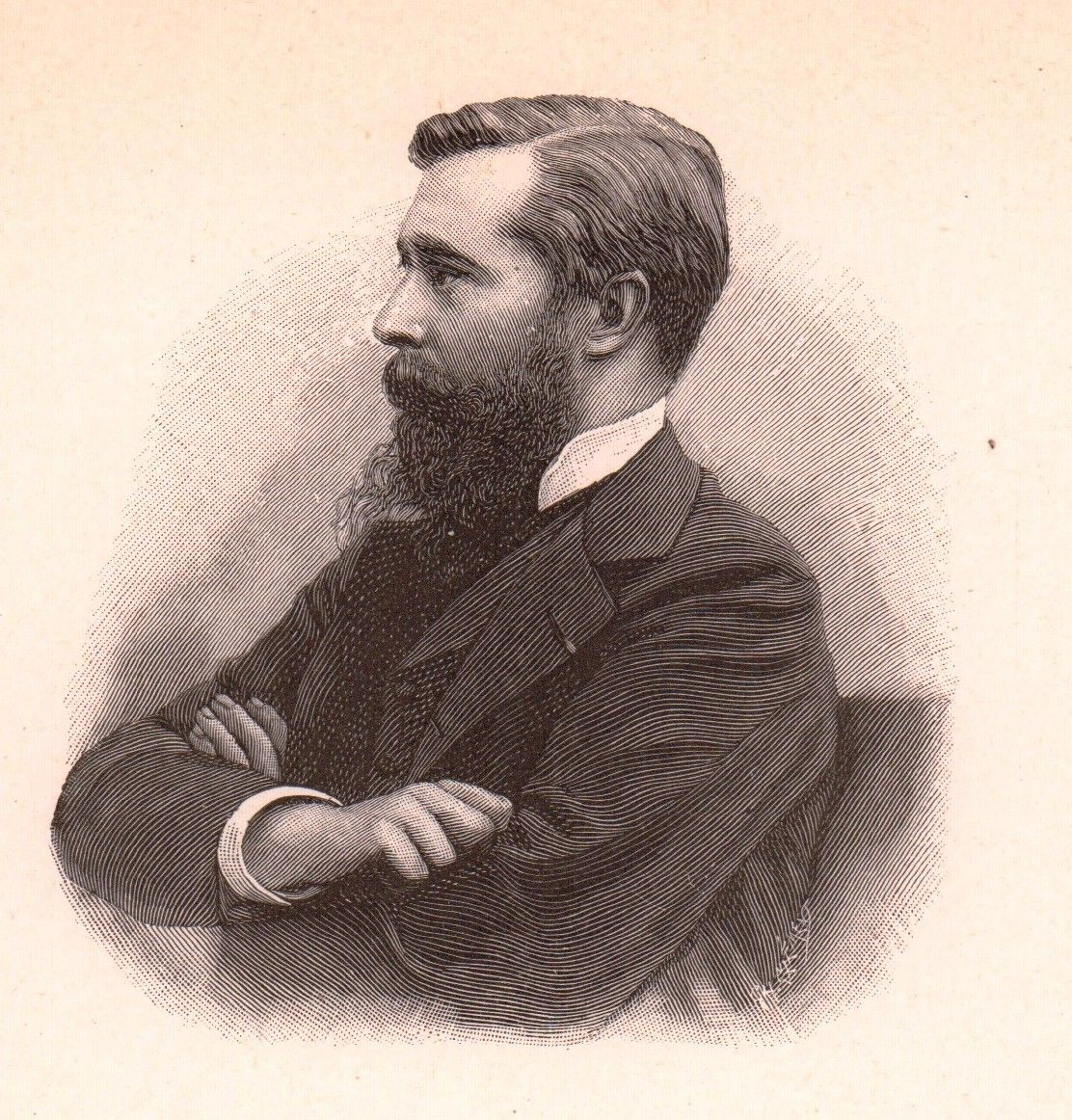
- André Lebon c. 1906

Deputy for Deux-Sèvres
- In office 20 August 1893 – 31 May 1898

Minister of Commerce, Industry and Posts & Telegraphs
- In office 26 January 1895 – 28 October 1895
- Prime Minister: Alexandre Ribot
- Preceded by: Victor Lourties
- Succeeded by: Gustave Mesureur

Minister of Colonies
- In office 26 April 1896 – 26 June 1898
- Prime Minister: Jules Méline
- Preceded by: Pierre-Paul Guieysse
- Succeeded by: Gabriel Hanotaux

Personal details
- Born: 26 August 1858 Dieppe, Seine-Inférieure, France
- Died: Paris, France
- Occupation: Politician

André Lebon (26 August 1858 – 17 February 1938) was a French lawyer and politician.

== Early years ==
André Lebon was born on 26 August 1858 in Dieppe, Seine-Inférieure. His father was Charles Lebon, founder of the Société du Gaz Lebon. After completing his secondary education André Lebon attended the Faculty of Law in Paris, where he obtained his license. He wrote many books on history and constitutional law. He was made a knight of the Legion of Honour in 1887, and later was promoted to Grand Officer. Until 1890, under the pseudonym André Daniel, he published an annual review of the history of the previous year entitled L'Année politique. He was appointed a professor at the École libre des sciences politiques in 1884. In 1890 he was secretary of the French delegation to the International Workers' Conference in Berlin.

== Political career ==
Lebon was chief of staff to the President of the Senate, Philippe Le Royer, from 1882 to 1893. Lebon ran for election on 22 September 1889 as deputy for Parthenay, Deux-Sèvres, on the Progressive Republican platform. He was defeated by the monarchist candidate, Paul Taudière. He ran again for the same seat on the same platform on 20 August 1893 and defeated Taudière on the first ballot. He wanted the republic to be open to all, and although he respected the freedom of the church he wanted it to have no influence on legislation. Lebon was secretary of the Chamber of Deputies until 1895. He was responsible for the Labor and Budget committees for the 1897 financial year.

Lebon was Minister of Commerce, Industry and Posts & Telegraphs from 26 January 1895 to 28 October 1895 in the cabinet of Alexandre Ribot. He resigned with his colleagues on 28 October 1895. He was Minister of Colonies from 26 April 1896 to 26 June 1898 in the cabinet of Jules Méline. Georges Bonnefous, who later would also become Minister of Commerce and Industry, served as his deputy chief of staff. Lebon was the first Minister of the Colonies to have made an official visit to one of them, when he visited Senegal while in office. He was criticized for having taken unnecessarily harsh measures against Alfred Dreyfus during his imprisonment on Devil's Island.

In the general elections of 8 May 1898 Lebon ran again for the Parthenay district but was defeated in the first round by the Marquis de Maussabré. He also failed to be elected on 27 April 1902.

== Later years (1898–1938) ==
Lebon then devoted himself to business, and served as censor of Crédit Foncier de France, chairman of the Board of Crédit Foncier d'Algerie, of the shipping line Messageries Maritimes and of several financial and industrial companies. He became first president of the Comité central des armateurs de France (CCAF: Central Committee of French Shipowners). He engaged Paul de Rousiers in 1903 to administer the committee. De Rousiers was secretary-general and vice-president-delegate of the committee.

André Lebon died on 17 February 1938 in Paris.

== Publications ==
Publications by André Lebon include the ten volumes of the Année politique. Books included:

- André Lebon (1882), L'Angleterre et l'émigration française de 1794 à 1801
- André Lebon (1879), Etudes sur la législation électorale de l'empire d'Allemagne
- André Lebon (1889), Recueil des instructions données aux ambassadeurs et ministres de France depuis les traités de Westphalie jusqu'à la Révolution (1648-1789), vol. VII, Bavière, Palatinat, Deux-Ponts
- André Lebon (1890), Etudes sur l'Allemagne politique
- André Lebon (1897), Cent ans d'histoire intérieure
- André Lebon (1897), Voyage au Sénégal et au Soudan de M. André Lebon, Ministre des Colonies (PDF), Saint-Louis: Imp. Générale du gouvernement, p. 219
- André Lebon (1900), La politique française en Afrique de 1896 à 1898
- André Lebon (1918), Problèmes économiques nés de la guerre, Paris: Librairie Payot & Cie, p. 274

André Lebon also contributed to the Revue politique et parlementaire and the Nouvelle revue.

== Sources ==
- André Lebon (in French), Assemblée nationale
- Jolly, Jean (1960–1977), "Lebon, André", Dictionnaire des parlementaires français de 1889 à 1940 (in French), Paris: Presses universitaires de France, ISBN 2-1100-1998-0
- Jolly, Jean (1977). "Georges, Edouard, Félix BONNEFOUS". dictionnaire des parlementaires français de 1889 à 1940 (in French).
- PAUL de ROUSIERS (in French), IUM: Union Industrielle et Maritime
- Savoye, Antoine (1988), "Paul de Rousiers, sociologue et praticien du syndicalisme", Cahiers Georges Sorel (in French), 6 (1): 52–77, doi:10.3406/mcm.1988.959
