= Georges Bonnefous =

French politician (1867–1956)

Georges Edouard Félix Bonnefous
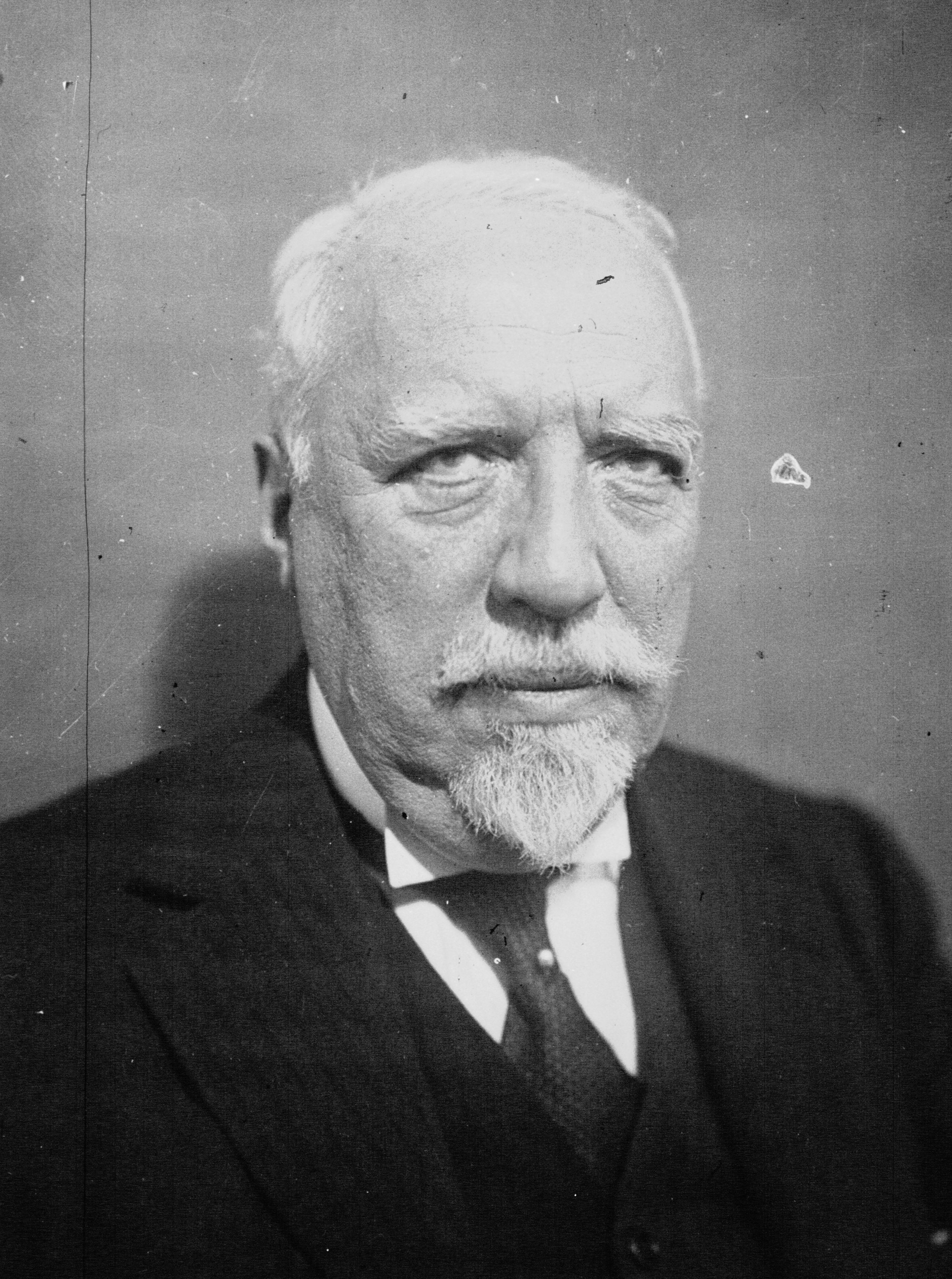
- Georges Bonnefous in 1939

Minister of Commerce and Industry
- In office 11 November 1928 – 3 November 1929
- Prime Minister: Raymond Poincaré; Aristide Briand
- Preceded by: Henry Chéron
- Succeeded by: Pierre-Étienne Flandin

Personal details
- Born: 30 November 1867 Paris, France
- Died: 27 May 1956 (aged 88) Paris, France
- Occupation: Lawyer

Georges Edouard Félix Bonnefous (30 November 1867 – 27 May 1956) was a French progressive Republican politician who was deputy for Seine-et-Oise from 1910 to 1936. He was Minister of Commerce and Industry from 11 November 1928 to 3 November 1929 in the governments of Raymond Poincaré and Aristide Briand.

== Early years ==
Georges Edouard Félix Bonnefous was born in Paris on 30 November 1867. He studied law, and in 1890 joined the Paris Bar. He became general counsel of the Parliamentary Press Union. From 1896 to 1898 he was deputy chief of staff of André Lebon, Minister of the Colonies. He contributed articles on politics to newspapers such La Liberté. From 1900 to 1906 he published L'année politique (The Year in Politics). As a progressive conservative and moderate nationalist he was invited to contribute to La République française, the daily paper that served as the organ of the Fédération républicaine. (Note: The Fédération républicaine was a party created in 1903 that combined progressivism with liberal and moderate views, and with republican nationalism.)

== Politician ==
Bonnefous ran successfully for election as deputy for the 2nd district of Versailles in the 24 April – 8 May 1910 general elections. He sat with the Democratic Republican Union. He was reelected in the general election of 26 April 1914. During World War I (1914–18) he represented the views of the Fédération républicaine. As the stalemate dragged on in 1916 the left-leaning deputies began calling for parliamentary representatives to inspect the front. The right opposed this, since it would divide authority. Bonnefous proposed that as a temporary measure a commission of forty deputies and forty senators should be given the authority to inspect. Parliament would meet weekly to register decrees issued by the government.

After the war he ran successfully for reelection on the Republican list of the National Democratic Union on 16 November 1919. From 1919 to 1924 he headed the committees on Finance and Universal Suffrage. He was reelected for the National Democratic Union in the general election of 11 May 1924. He was elected once more in the general election of 22 April 1928.

On 11 November 1928 Bonnefous was appointed Minister of Commerce and Industry in the fifth cabinet of Raymond Poincaré. The cabinet resigned on 27 July 1929 and was replaced by the 11th cabinet of Aristide Briand. Bonnefous remained Minister of Commerce and Industry until Briand's cabinet resigned on 22 October 1929. He was involved in discussions over trade agreements with Austria and Czechoslovakia. Bonnefous was reelected in the general election of May 1932. He did not seek reelection on 26 April 1936. After retiring he wrote several books, including the "Political History of the Third Republic". Georges Bonnefous died in Paris on 27 May 1956.

=== Family background ===
His son, Édouard Bonnefous, also became a deputy and a minister.

== Publications ==
Publications by Bonnefous include:

- Georges Bonnefous (1892). Barreau de Paris. Le Procès du maréchal Ney. Discours prononcé par Georges Bonnefous,... à l'ouverture de la conférence des avocats le 26 novembre 1892... Paris: impr. de Alcan-Lévy. p. 63.
- Édouard Bonnefous; Georges Bonnefous (1956). Histoire politique de la Troisième République. Vol. 1–6. Paris: Presses universitaires de France.

== Sources ==
- Bernard, Mathias (2007-08-23). Guerre des droites (La): De l'affaire Dreyfus à nos jours. Odile Jacob. ISBN 978-2-7381-1982-7.
- "Georges Bonnefous (1867-1956) - Auteur du texte (1867-1956) - Auteur du texte". BnF.
- Jolly, Jean (1977). "Georges, Edouard, Félix BONNEFOUS". dictionnaire des parlementaires français de 1889 à 1940 (in French).
- Passmore, Kevin (2013). The Right in France from the Third Republic to Vichy. OUP Oxford. ISBN 978-0-19-965820-6.
