= Louis Vigouroux =

French economist and politician

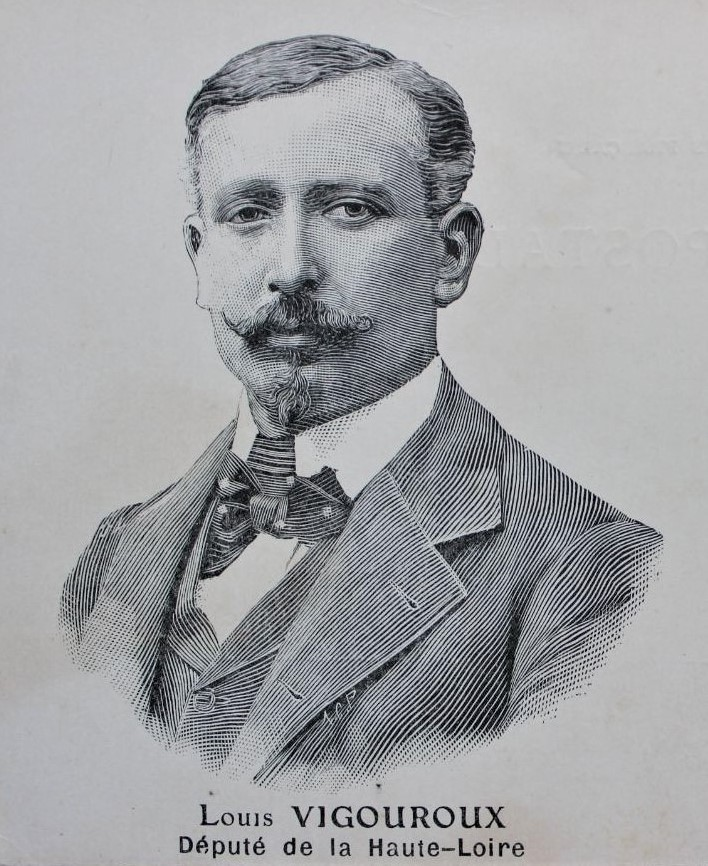
- Louis Vigouroux c. 1904

Deputy for Haute-Loire
- In office 16 September 1900 – 31 May 1910
- Preceded by: Charles Dupuy
- Succeeded by: Joseph Boutaud

Personal details
- Born: 25 August 1865 Le Puy-en-Velay, Haute-Loire, France
- Died: 16 November 1956 (aged 91) Paris, France
- Occupation: Economist and politician

Louis Vigouroux (25 August 1865 – 16 November 1956) was a French economist and politician who was a national deputy from 1900 to 1910. He had liberal views, which he expressed in various books and magazine articles.

== Life ==
Louis Vigouroux was born on 25 August 1865 in Le Puy-en-Velay, Haute-Loire. He studied classics at the Lycée du Puy, then studied at the Faculty of Law in Paris, earning his license in 1891. He became a Professor of Political and Industrial Economics at the Free College of Social Sciences. For two years he also headed the section of financial studies of the Crédit Lyonnais. He held liberal views, which were expressed in his contributions to the Nouveau dictionnaire d'économie politique published in 1890 under the direction of Léon Say and Joseph Chailley, works for the Liberal Association for the Defense of Labor and French trade, and articles in the Monde économique, Journal des économistes and Revue politique et parlementaire, among others.

Louis Vigouroux undertook many study tours for the Musée social, including England, Greece, Algeria, United States, Canada (1896), South Africa (1897-1898), Australia and New Zealand. Paul de Rousiers led a team in the US from July to December 1896 that included F. de Carbonnel, Pierre Claudio-Jannet and Louis Vigouroux. This resulted in several articles and two books, La Concentration des forces ouvrières dans l'Amérique du Nord by Vigouroux and Les Industries monopolisées (trusts) aux Etats-Unis by de Rousiers. Vigouroux also published L'évolution sociale en Australie in 1902.

Louis Vigouroux ran for election as deputy for Haute-Loire on the Gauche démocratique platform on 16 September 1900. He ran for the first constituency of Le Puy in the by-election after the incumbent Charles Dupuy had been elected senator, and won in the first round. He was reelected on the same platform on 27 April 1902 and 20 May 1906. Vigouroux was a moderate republican and sat with the democratic left. He belonged to the committees on Agriculture, Trade & Industry, External Affairs and Protectorates & Colonies. He often acted as rapporteur. In the election of 24 April 1910 he was beaten in the first round by Joseph Boutaud. He left office on 31 May 1910.

Louis Vigouroux was a member of the French Association for the Advancement of Science, the Society of Political Economy, and the Society of Commercial Geography. Louis Vigouroux died on 16 November 1956 in Paris.

== Publications ==
Publications by Louis Vigouroux, other than parliamentary proposals and reports, include:

- Louis Vigouroux (1892), Le Tarif de 1892. Table alphabétique et analytique du "Journal officiel", preface by J. Chailley-Bert, Paris: Association libérale pour la défense du travail et du commerce français / Guillaumin
- Louis Vigouroux (1899), La concentration des forces ouvrières dans l'Amérique du Nord, preface by Paul de Rousiers, Paris: A. Colin
- Louis Vigouroux (1902), L'Évolution sociale en Australasie, Paris: Bibliothèque du Musée social / A. Colin
- Louis Vigouroux (1903), Des Garanties accordées aux ouvriers pour le paiement de leurs salaires (Thesis), Bordeaux: Faculté de droit de l'Université de Bordeaux / impr. de Y. Cadoret

== Sources ==
- Jolly, Jean (1960–1977), "Louis Vigouroux", Biographie extraite du dictionnaire des parlementaires français de 1889 à 1940 (in French), Paris: Presses universitaires de France, ISBN 2-1100-1998-0
- Louis Vigouroux (in French), Assemblée nationale
- Louis Vigouroux (1866-1956) - Auteur du texte (in French), BnF: Bibliotheque nationale de France
- Savoye, Antoine (1988), "Paul de Rousiers, sociologue et praticien du syndicalisme", Cahiers Georges Sorel (in French), 6 (1)
