= Émile Cheysson =

French engineer (1836–1910)

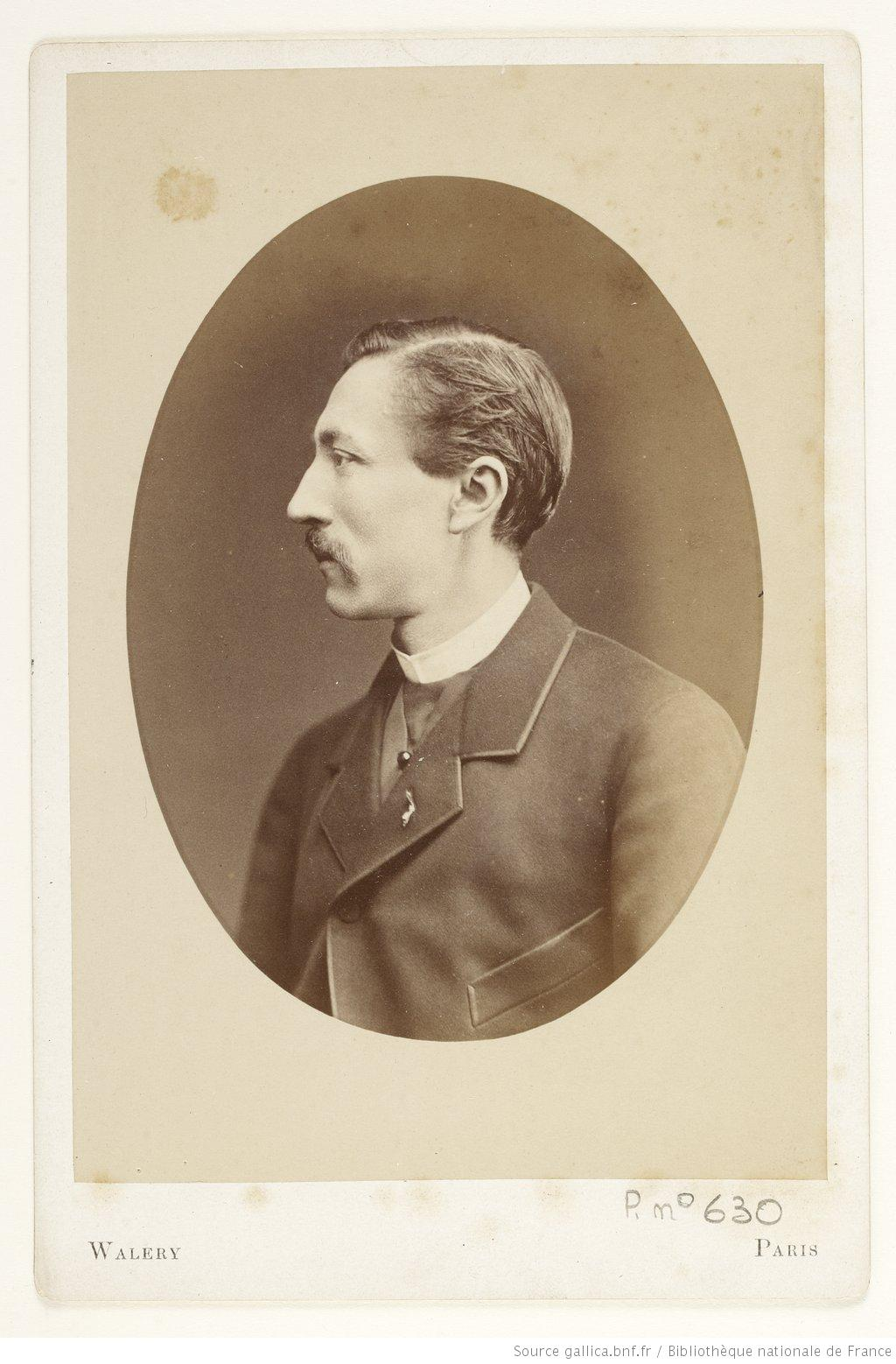
- Portrait of Émile Cheysson
- Born: May 18, 1836; Nîmes, France
- Died: February 7, 1910 (aged 73); Leysin, Switzerland
- Known for: Contributions to graphical methods
- Notable work: Albums de statistique graphique

Jean Jacques Émile Cheysson (Nîmes, 18 May 1836 – Leysin, 7 February 1910) was a French engineer, designer of roads and bridges, and social reformer, who made a career as in industry and in the French administration. He has played an important role in the institutionalization of statistics in France, and has published a series of graphic statistical albums for the French Ministry of Public Works, which are considered as extraordinary examples of data visualization. At the same time, he was a disciple of Frédéric Le Play and resumed sociological work and his monographic method.

Cheysson was a graduate of the École Polytechnique, where he graduated in 1854. Under Frédéric Le Play he participated in the organization of the Universal Exhibition of 1867. He was director of the Le Creusot factories in Le Creusot from 1871 to 1874, professor of political and social economics at the Ecole libre des sciences politiques and professor of industrial economics at the École des mines, and then inspector general of Ponts et Chaussées.

== Gallery ==
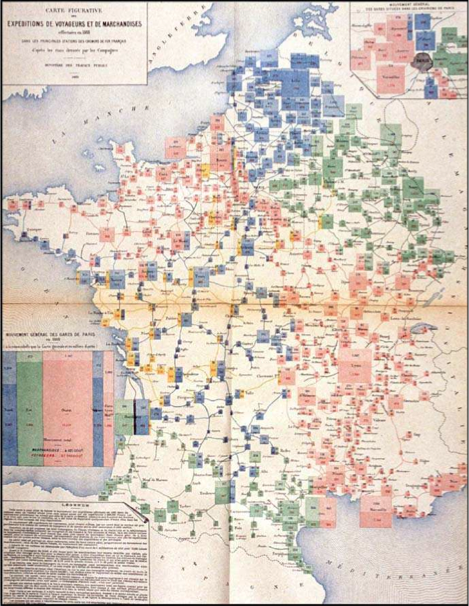
Expéditions de voyageurs et de marchandises, Album de statistique graphique, 1884.

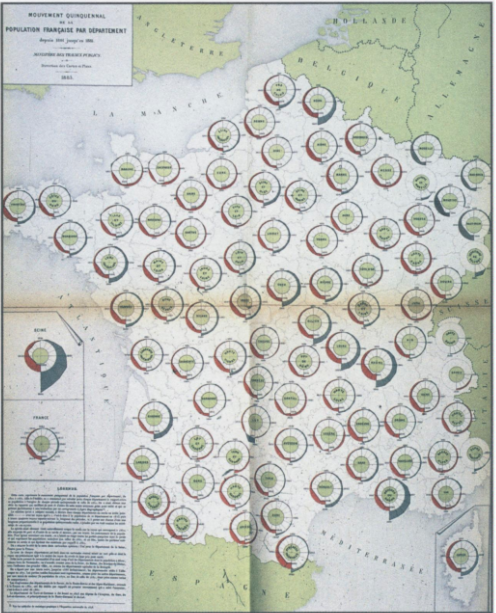
Movement of population every five year by French departments from 1801 to 1881.

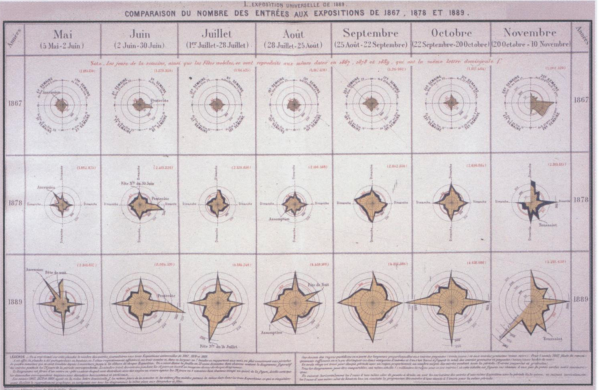
« Comparison of the number of visitors to World's fair in 1867, 1878, and 1889 », Album de statistique graphique, 1889.

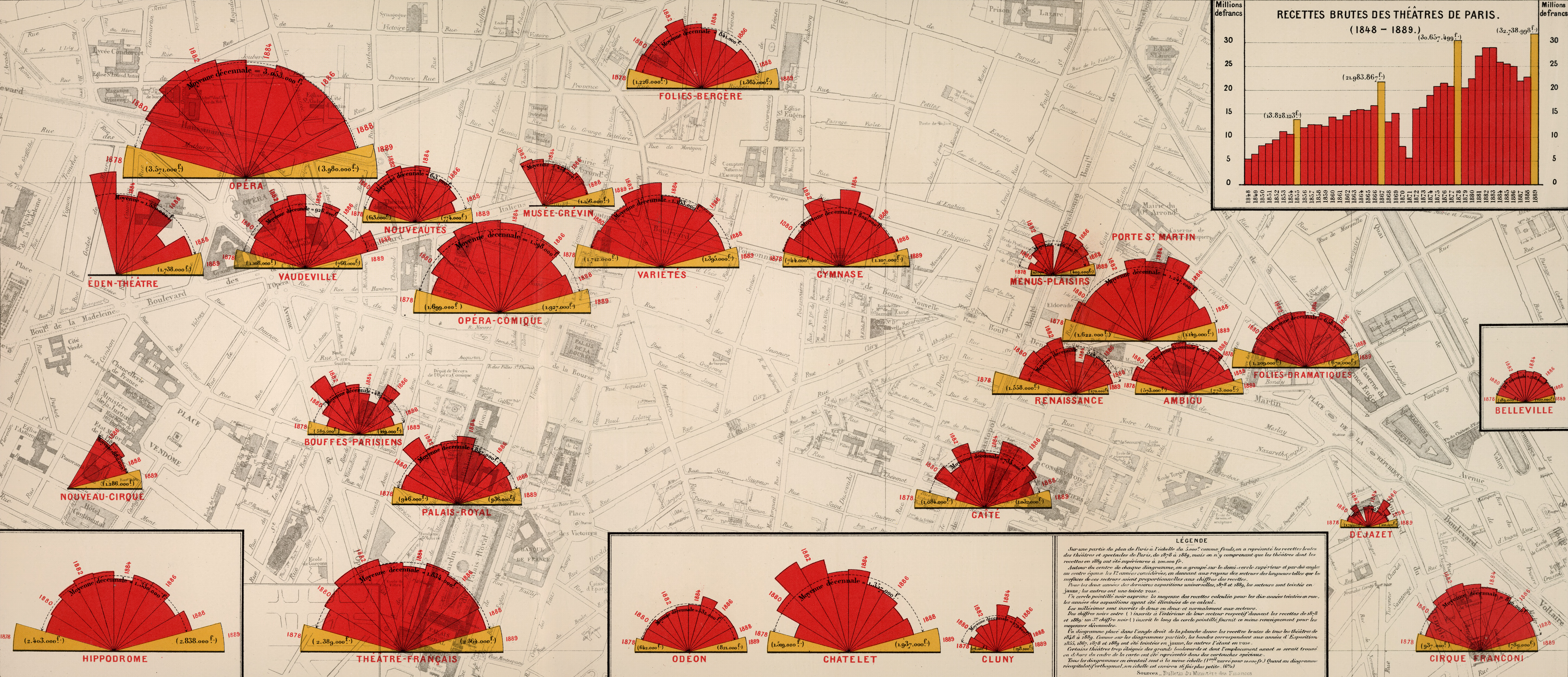
« Recettes brutes des théâtres et spectacles de Paris de 1878 à 1889 », Album de statistique graphique, 1889.

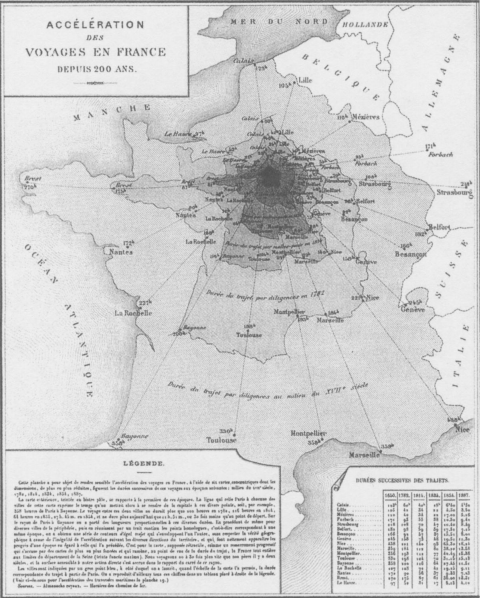
« Accélération des voyages en France depuis 200 ans », Album de statistique graphique, 1888.

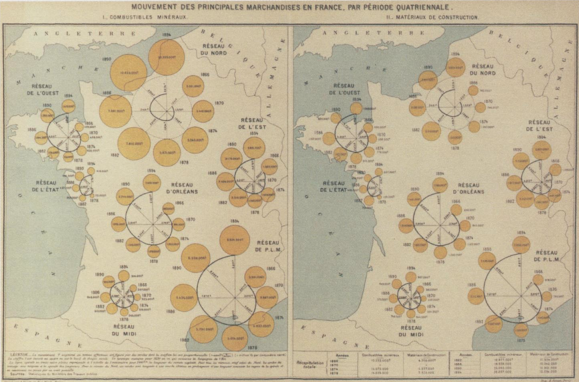
« Mouvement des principales marchandises en France, par période quadriennale », Album de statistique graphique, 1895-1896.
