= Henri de Tourville =

French priest

Henri de Tourville (1842–1903), also often referred to as Abbé Henri de Tourville, was a French priest who distinguished himself as one of the precursors of sociology, as well as in the fields of philosophy and education. Initially influenced by Frédéric Le Play, he broke with him and created a school called Social Science. His disciple and friend Edmond Demolins founded the famous École des Roches near Verneuil-sur-Avre.

== Life ==
Born in Paris on 19 March 1842, he was trained in the Catholic seminary of Issy-les-Moulineaux and in the law school of the Sorbonne university in Paris. He always had a poor health and dedicated most of his life to writing from his family estate of Tourville, where he had to retire after only a few years of work as a priest in Paris. There, he would also receive and counsel his many disciples and friends. He wrote only one book but developed his thinking through an extremely abundant correspondence. He died in Tourville Castle on 5 March 1903.

== Thought ==
=== Social science ===
Herri de Tourville opened a new era in social research when he developed a tool allowing for the analysis and classification of observations about a social group, which was published in 1886 under the name of "social facts nomenclature", which included 25 major categories and over 100 sub-categories relevant to localisation, wealth, income, education and religion. Going beyond the mere economic characteristics used by Le Play Henri de Tourville emphasized the « geographical space’s constraints » and their impact of individuals or social groups. The "nomenclature" allowed comparisons of numerous elements (or variables) within a given society of even internationally, which in turn generated hypothesis that could be tested and determine two types of relations: causality or co-existence.

Tourville's school of thought became structured in 1904, shortly after his death, under the leadership of Paul de Rousiers who created the Société internationale de science sociale (SISS), In 1945, the society was merged with the Société internationale des études pratiques d’économie sociale (SIEPES) which had been created by Frédéric Le Play in 1856, and the new body became known as the Société d’économie sociale et de science sociales (SESS).

=== Philosophy ===
Much like Joseph Gratry and Maine de Biran, Tourville's philosophy rests on a sociological and scientific basis associated with spiritual and metaphysical elements". In his numerous articles which were later bundled into a book, he described his theory of a partly mythical history of humankind in which Goth migrants had come directly from Asia and settled on the western part of Scandinavia. Having escaped any Greco-Roman influence and having gained a culture of migration led by strong leaders, the Germanic people therefore acquired a superior ability in terms of industrial and intellectual arts. The theory would trigger Paul Bureau's 1906 research on “the farmer of the Norwegian fjords", which showed how the narrow and scattered farmable strips of land in the fjords' area led joint family structures to break up and forced the migrants to get settled as nuclear families and to pass their heritage to their only child. That was assumed to be the origin of the Anglo-Saxon race and of the nuclear family.
In that framework, Tourville studied property as well as moral transmission within families and turned his attention towards education matters.

=== "Particularist education" ===
In his reflection on education, Tourville developed the idea of "particularist education", but it remained a theoretical concept. His disciple Edmond Demolins, the author of a noted book on "the origins of Anglo-Saxon superiority", would be the first to derive a concrete educational experience from it, the École des Roches. "Particularist education" views the endemic authority crisis of its time as a reaction against the prevalent authoritarian catholic tradition. Tourville and Demolins thought that the traditional morals and authority ethos will inexorably give way. Their refondation needs to go through the individual. Education can lead each individual to become autonomous. Self-control must replace control of the other. Particularist education allows combating the wild form of competition, which is the hallmark of worldwide capitalism, and the prevention of social reproduction.

== Works ==
Tourville wrote mostly articles and letters. Two books drawn from that material were bundled together and edited by his disciples and friends after his death:

- Histoire de la formation particulariste: l'origine des grands peuples actuels, éditeur Firmin-Didot, 1905, 547 pages.
- Henri de Tourville d'après ses lettres . Introduction et notes, par le R. P. Marie-André Dieux, Éditeurs : Imprimerie Floch (Mayenne) et librairie Bloud et Gay (Paris), 1928, 271 pages

The following translations of de Tourville's work can be found:

- The Growth of Modern Nations: a History of The Particularist Form of Society, publisher: Edward Arnold, London, 1907
- Letters of Direction: Thoughts on the Spiritual Life from the Letters of the Abbé de Tourville, translated by Lucy Menzies, with an introduction by Evelyn Underhill; publisher: Morehouse Publishing Co, New York, 1984 (reprint of Dacre Press, London, 1939)
- Streams of Grace, a Selection of the Letters of the Abbé de Tourville, publisher: Bloomsbury Academic, 2006

== Bibliography ==
- Edmond Demolins, La méthode sociale, ses procédés et ses applications, in La science sociale suivant la méthode d’observation, 19ème année, 2ème période, 1er fascicule, Paris, 1904, pages 1 à 17
- Abbé Claude Bouvier, Un prêtre continuateur de Le Play, Henri de Tourville, Librairie Bloud, Paris, 1907
- Prosper Prieur, Henri de Tourville, Paris, Librairie Plon, 1911
- R.P. Marie-André Dieux, L’Abbé de Tourville 1842–1903, Paris, Ernest Flammarion, 1931
