= Musée social =

Private French institution

- Established: 1894
- Address: 5, rue Las Cases - 75007 Paris
- Location: Paris, France
- Coordinates: 48.858068°N 2.321866°E
- Website: cedias.org
- Dissolved: 1963

Location in Paris

The Musée social (French pronunciation: [myze sɔsjal]) was a private French institution founded in 1894. In the early twentieth century it became an important center of research into topics such as city planning, social housing and labor organization. For many years it played an important role in influencing government policy.

== Origins ==
The original purpose of the Musée social was to preserve documents from the Social Economy pavilion of the Exposition Universelle (1889). This exposition, one hundred years after the French Revolution, had recorded the many changes in thought about the organization of society that had followed. The project to create the museum came from a meeting of Jules Siegfried, Léon Say and Émile Cheysson with count Joseph Dominique Aldebert de Chambrun in 1894. The count decided to devote his fortune to the foundation, which was officially inaugurated in March 1895. Although called a museum, in fact it became a research institute. Jules Siegfried was president, Émile Cheysson and Charles Robert were vice presidents, Édouard Gruner was secretary-treasurer, and board members included Georges Picot, Albert Gigot and Émile Boutmy.

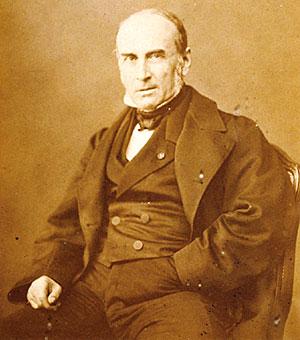
Frédéric Le Play. a sociologist whose views were influential among the early workers at the Musée social

Towards the end of the nineteenth century there were many non-governmental organizations interested in reform. The Musée social tried to coordinate the efforts of the groups working on "the social question." The Musée social brought together followers of Frédéric Le Play and others who were interested in improving the well-being of the masses while promoting private initiative, going beyond the timid reforms being considered by the government. Many historians consider that the French welfare state originated in the work done at the Musée social.

Robert Pinot was appointed the first administrative director of the Musée social in 1894, with the mandate of overseeing its "sound and rapid organization." He resigned from this position in 1897 due to a disagreement with Aldebert de Chambrun and the Musée board. He felt that the institution had not maintained its goals of being purely scientific and outside politics. Perhaps more to the point, he also resented his lack of autonomy.

== Organization ==
The Musée social was well-funded, and followed an innovative model. It had several sections of study and research with the goal of documenting new topics for debate, possible changes to legislation, and development of new ideas. The institute paid researchers, whose reports were presented at conferences and published in the institute's journals or in collections of work that it published. One section, for example, was headed by Léon de Seilhac and studied contemporary labor movements. Another covered the major strikes during the third republic. Other sections covered topics such as urban and rural sanitation, agriculture, social insurance and employer institutions. All the material was held in the library, and made available to the public.

The feminist Eliska Vincent collected a huge library on feminism and on the communards. On her death in 1914 she bequeathed the collection to the Musée social in the hope that it would organize a feminist institute. The museum created a section for women's studies in 1916, but despite the efforts of Vincent's executors, Marguerite Durand and Maria Vérone, the museum did not accept the archives. The legacy, estimated to include 600,000 documents, was rejected in 1919. The reason was the cost of paying off outstanding tax debts. Vincent's collection has disappeared and was probably destroyed.

== Influence ==
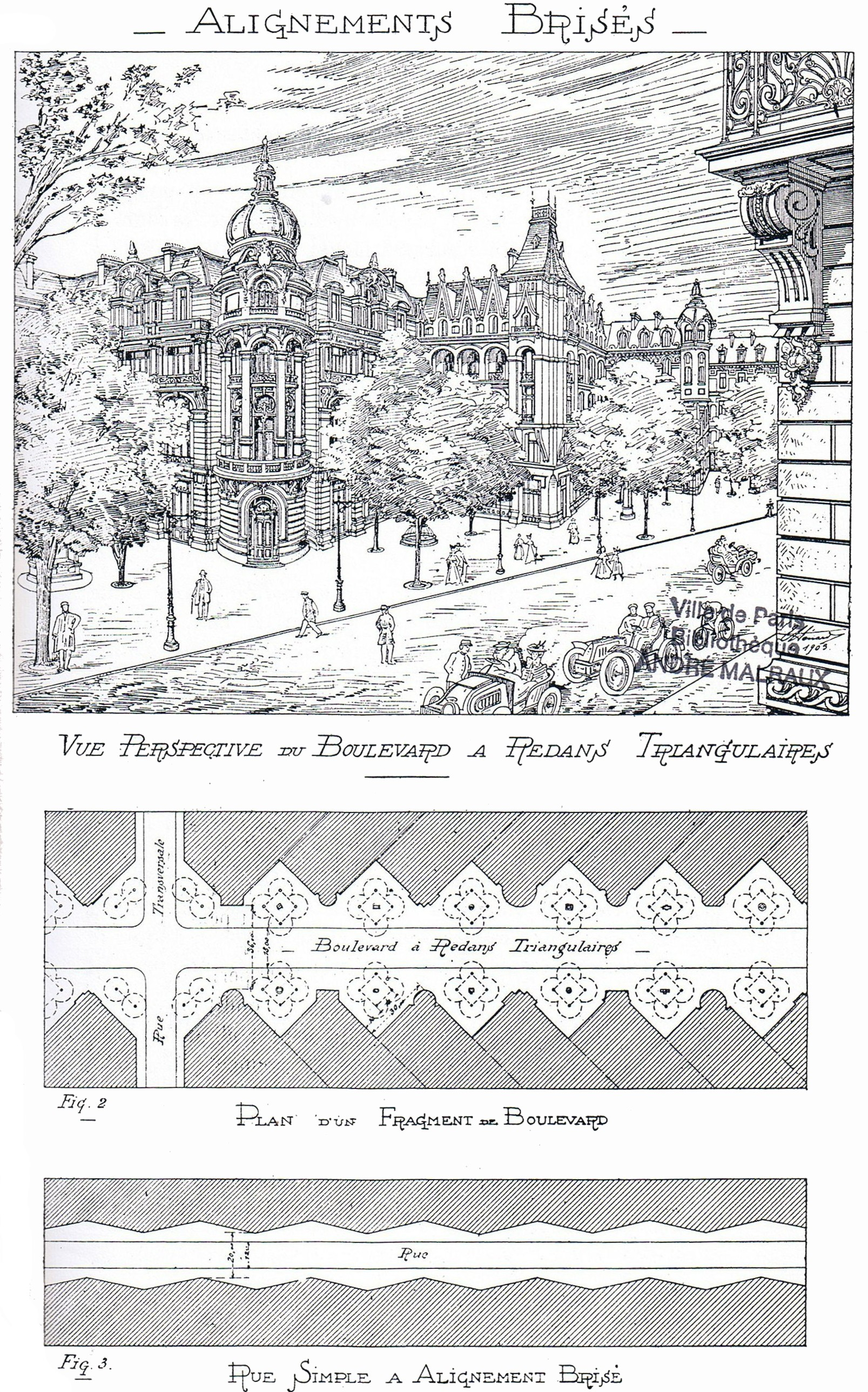
Stepped boulevard design advocated by Eugène Hénard to create more green space in the city

The staff of the Musée social had diverse views, but were generally in favor of reform, and were influential in inspiring many parliamentary bills. At one time the institute was called "the antechamber of the House." The most conspicuous role of the institute was in bills related to urban planning, including maintaining a green belt around Pairs where the old fortifications had stood, managing the expansion of cities and providing social housing. Between 1894 and 1914 over 500 members of the Musée social wrote leaflets and brochures, gave lectures, studied conditions abroad and responded to all requests. In 1900 the Musée social gave 1,200 written replies and 3,299 oral consultations. Under pressure from economists and the followers of Louis Pasteur the institute moved from supporting a philanthropic approach to handling social issues to one of greater state intervention.

In 1903 the architect and influential urban planner Eugène Hénard proposed using the land reserved for the obsolete Paris fortifications as the basis for a belt of parks. Hénard wanted to develop better radial thoroughfares, and to take the opportunity presented by demolition of the old city fortifications to build a ring road and new parks and housing. This was supported by the Musée Social, which in 1910 asked citizens to vote in the forthcoming elections for candidates who backed the parkland and urban conservation programs.

In 1908 Hénard headed one of two committees of the Musee Social. His committee was responsible for identifying urban and rural hygiene problems and proposing solutions, while the other committee was to draft legislation and find legal methods for implementing his group's proposals. In November 1911 Henri Prost was assigned to assist Hénard, since he was in poor health. Hénard proposed new housing units with a staggered arrangement so as to maximize the light received by each apartment and to create more recreational space. He received strong support from the Musée Social and from other urban planners, but was opposed by real estate investors who feared the impact of his planned 75,000 apartment units. After World War I (1914-1918) most of the fortifications area that was to be used for his projects was instead sold in independent parcels to various developers.

== Later years ==
After World War II the institute became less influential, reverting to a research and documentation role. In 1963 it merged with the Office central des œuvres de bienfaisance (OCOB: Central Office for Charities) which evaluated and coordinated charities to ensure effective use of funds. The new organization was called the Centre d’études, de documentation, d’information et d’action sociales - Musée social (CEDIAS: Centre for Studies, Documentation, Information and Social Action - Social museum).
