= Pierre Guillaume Frédéric le Play =

French sociologist and engineer

Frédéric le Play
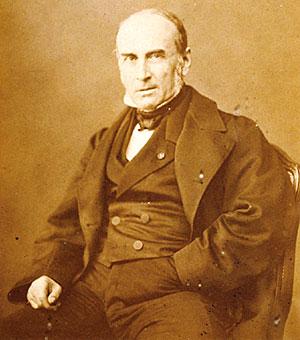
- Born: Pierre Guillaume Frédéric le Play; 11 April 1806; La Rivière-Saint-Sauveur, French Empire
- Died: 5 April 1882 (aged 75); Paris, France

Academic background
- Education: École Polytechnique, École des Mines

Academic work
- Discipline: Economics, political economy, sociology, epistemology, engineering

Pierre Guillaume Frédéric le Play (French: [pjɛʁ ɡijom fʁedeʁik lə plɛ]; April 11, 1806 – April 5, 1882) was a French engineer, sociologist and economist.

== Life ==
The son of a custom-house official, Le Play was educated at the École Polytechnique and the École des Mines. He took an interest in sociological questions even as a young man at the École des Mines, befriending a follower of the socialist thinker Saint-Simon. In the late 1820s, Le Play undertook an immense walking tour of Germany investigating its mines. In 1830, a laboratory accident seriously damaged Le Play's left hand and left him disabled for life. While he was recovering in Paris, he was a witness to the events of the July Revolution, and thereafter resolved himself to studying the issues that plagued French society.

In 1834, he was appointed chairman of the permanent committee of mining statistics. He spent the remainder of the 1830s traveling the backroads of Europe as a mining expert, and conducting empirical studies on the state of mines and their workers. In 1840, he became engineer-in-chief and professor of metallurgy at the École des Mines, and was made inspector in 1848. In the 1840s he also became the manager of a mining company in the Ural Mountains. During this time he also met with many of France's leading thinkers and politicians, including Félix Dupanloup, Alphonse de Lamartine, Charles Montalembert, Adolphe Thiers, and Alexis de Tocqueville, to discuss social issues.

For nearly a quarter of a century Le Play travelled around Europe, collecting a vast amount of material bearing on the social and economic condition of the working classes. In 1855, he published Les Ouvriers Européens (The European Workers), a series of 36 monographs on the budgets of typical families selected from a wide range of industries. This work was crowned with the Montyon prize conferred by the Académie des Sciences. In 1856, Le Play founded the Société internationale des études pratiques d'économie sociale (International Society for Practical Studies of Social Economy), which has devoted its energies principally to forwarding social studies on the lines laid down by its founder. The journal of the society, La Réforme Sociale, founded in 1881, is published fortnightly.

Emperor Napoleon III, who had met Le Play in Russia during his travels across Europe in the 1840s and held him in high esteem, entrusted him with the organization of the Exhibition of 1855. The following year Napoleon III appointed Le Play to the Council of State, the legislative assembly of the Second French Empire, where his official duties included overseeing numerous industries. He was made commissioner general of the Exhibition of 1867, senator of the empire and Grand Officer of the Légion d'honneur.

At the prompting of the Emperor, Le Play published his recommendations for improving French society in his work Social Reform in France (1864). Initially an atheist, Le Play gradually became convinced of the need for religion. In the essay he defended Christianity against Darwinism, scepticism, and racialism.

After the Franco-Prussian War and the fall of the Second Empire in 1870, he founded and directed the Unions of Social Peace, an organization composed of study circles of leading men dedicated to healing France's political and social divisions. He converted to Roman Catholicism in 1879, three years before his death.

== Thought ==
Le Play's essay, Social Reform in France, expounds the basis of his thinking and provides his recommendations to heal the divisions within French society. Le Play situated himself within the French Counter-Enlightenment and Counter-Revolutionary tradition by criticising many of the social trends that were the result of the Enlightenment and the French Revolution. Le Play was critical of the Enlightenment idea that man was by nature good, and that moral progress inevitably followed from material progress. He also opposed theories of political and racial determinism. He believed that societies, like human beings, are truly free, and that a society that uses its capacities to overcome the human propensity for evil would flourish and those that did not would decay. He looked to the past to glean examples of how this could be done, and he especially held up the Middle Ages as the exemplar for social relations. For this reason he opposed the French Revolution's uncritical rejection of the past, especially France's Christian past.

Le Play also believed strong families played a key role in the health of a society, and he placed particular emphasis on the role of mothers and women. Social Reform in France makes two key points about the family: the first is that social progress is tied to support for homeownership and family inheritance. Like Louis de Bonald before him, Le Play opposed partitive inheritance and held the agricultural family as the ideal. His second key point was that women are the driving force of social and moral progress in any society.

== Legacy ==
Le Play's work was further developed by his many disciples: Adolphe Focillon (1823–1890), Émile Cheysson (1836–1910), Alexis Delaire (1836–1915), Henri de Tourville (1842–1903), Claudio Jannet (1844–1894), Edmond Demolins (1852–1907), Paul de Rousiers (1857–1934), Gabriel Olphe-Galliard (1870–1947), the Belgian Victor Brants (1854–1917) and the Canadian Léon Gérin.

After an eclipse between the 1940s and the 1960s Le Play's methods resurfaced when the "history of the family" became a new field of interest in social science. In Britain, Peter Laslett who worked within the Cambridge Group for the History of Population and Social Structure used le Play's methods at the end of the 1960s to study family structures from census and property transmission data, describing particularly the nuclear family structure which Le Play had not worked on.

At about the same time in France, legal history academics working on customary law were the first to re-apply Le Play's methods in scientific research. In the early 1970s, a growing number of ethnologists and historians joined this trend, especially those within the historical anthropology school: André Burguière, Emmanuel Le Roy Ladurie. In a 1989 book which became a reference in its field, ethnologist Georges Augustins reshaped Le Play's family types classification.

Some sociologists rediscovered Le Play's work as well from the late 1960s on, overcoming the general opinion that Le Play's views were just overly conservative, particularly Paul Lazarsfeld, Antoine Savoye and Bernard Kalaora.

At the end of the 1970s historian and demographer Emmanuel Todd, a disciple of both Emmanuel Le Roy Ladurie and Peter Laslett, was struck by the geographical similarity between the area of prevalence of the communitarian family system (patriarcal family in Le Play's words) and the regions where communism had become dominant in the 20th century. He reprocessed Le Play's study of family structures and published a number of widely publicised books establishing a link between traditional family structures and the great ideological and society movements in European history (religious and political choices, economic development, ...).

== Gallery ==
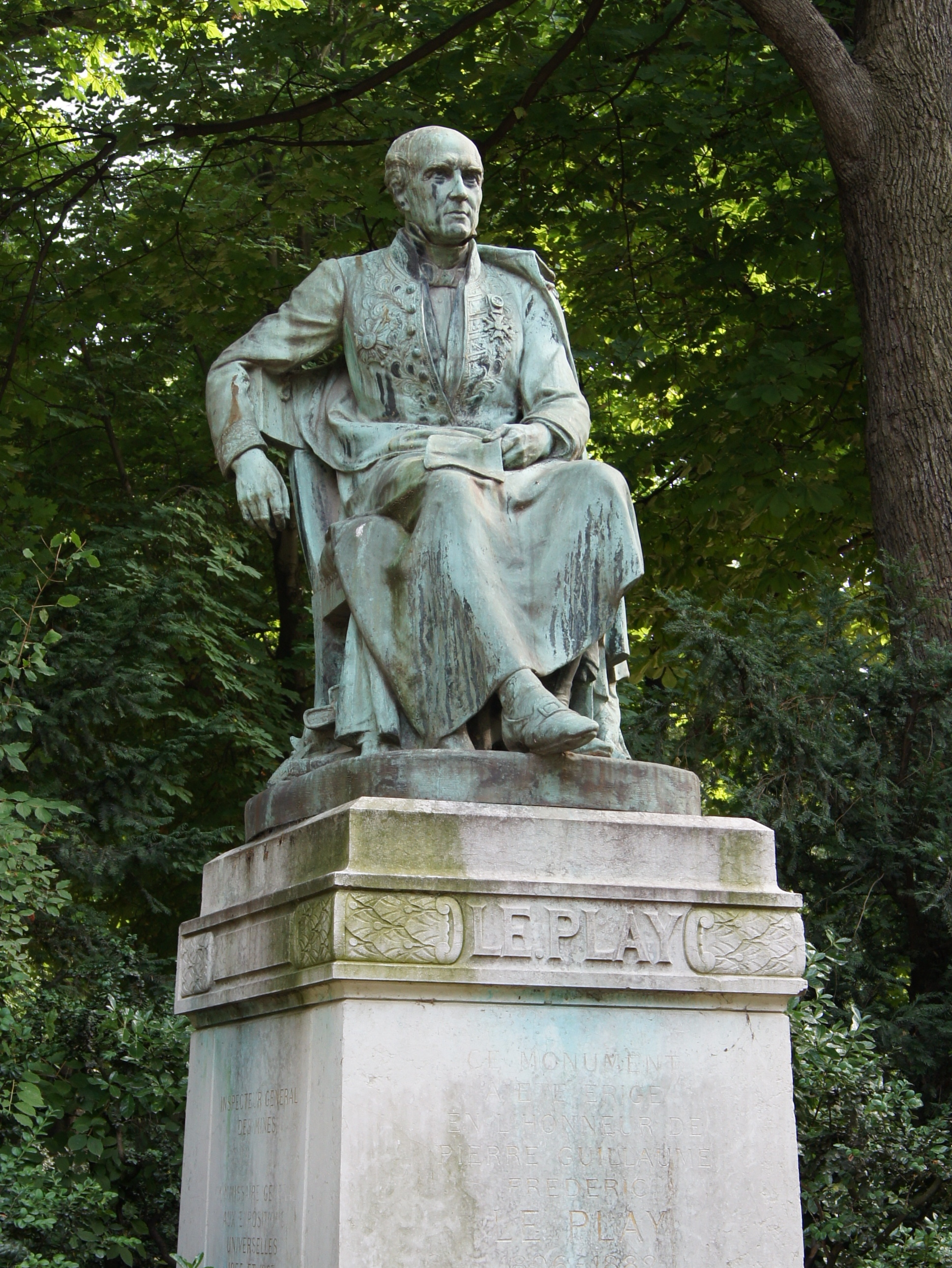
Statue of Frédéric Le Play, by André-Joseph Allar, at the Jardin du Luxembourg (Paris, 1906).

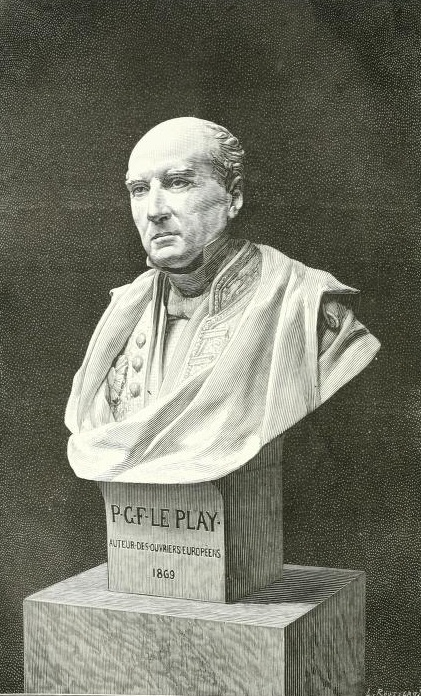
Le Play, by L. Rousseau, 1879.

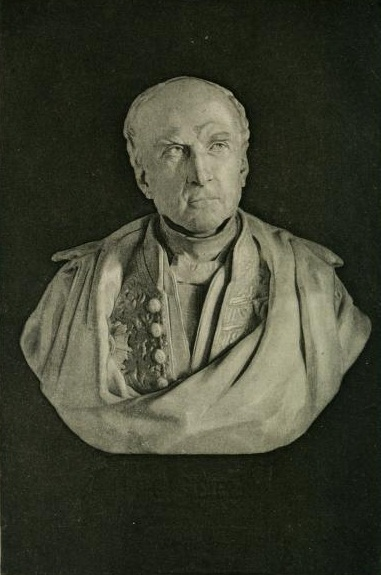
Bust of Frédéric Le Play, by Chapu, 1869.

== Works ==
- (1843) "Sur la Fabrication de l’ Acier en Yorkshire" Annale des Mines, 4e série, Tome III, pp. 195ff. (bound with the following:)
- (1846) Mémoire sur la fabrication, le commerce et l'emploi des fers à acier du Nord de l'Europe.
- (1864). La Réforme Sociale.
- (1871). L'Organisation de la Famille.
- (1875). La Constitution de l'Angleterre. (in collaboration with M. Delaire)

In English translation

- (1872). The Organization of Labor in Accordance With Custom and the Law of the Decalogue. Philadelphia: Claxton, Remsen & Haffelfinger.
- (1962). "Household Economy." In: Parsons, Talcott et al., editors, Theories of Society. The Free Press of Glencoe, Inc.
- (1982). Frederic Le Play on Family, Work, and Social Change. Silver, Catherine Bodard, editor and translator, University of Chicago Press.
- (2004). "Social Reform in France." In: Blum, Christopher Olaf, editor and translator, Critics of the Enlightenment. Wilmington DE: ISI Books, pp. 197–258.
- (2020). "Social Reform in France." In: Blum, Christopher O., editor and translator, Critics of the Enlightenment. Providence RI: Cluny Media, pp. 103–149.

== Sources ==
- Brooke, Michael Z. (1970). Le Play, Engineer and Social Scientist: The Life and Work of Frederic Le Play. Harlow UK: Longmans.
- Herbertson, Fanny Louisa Dorothea (1950). The Life of Frédéric Le Play, Ledbury, Herefordshire: Le Play House Press.
