= List of people with Huguenot ancestry =

Some notable French Huguenots or people with French Huguenot ancestry include:

== Architects ==
- Salomon de Brosse (1571–1626), French architect.
- Isaac de Caus (1590–1648), architect, garden designer.
- Samuel Fortrey (1622–1681), architect, designer of Kew Palace, descendant of de La Forteries.
- James Gandon (1742–1823), Anglo-Irish Georgian architect.
- Benjamin Henry Latrobe (1764–1820), British-born architect of the United States Capitol.
- Le Corbusier (1887–1965), architect, occultist with Huguenot ancestry.
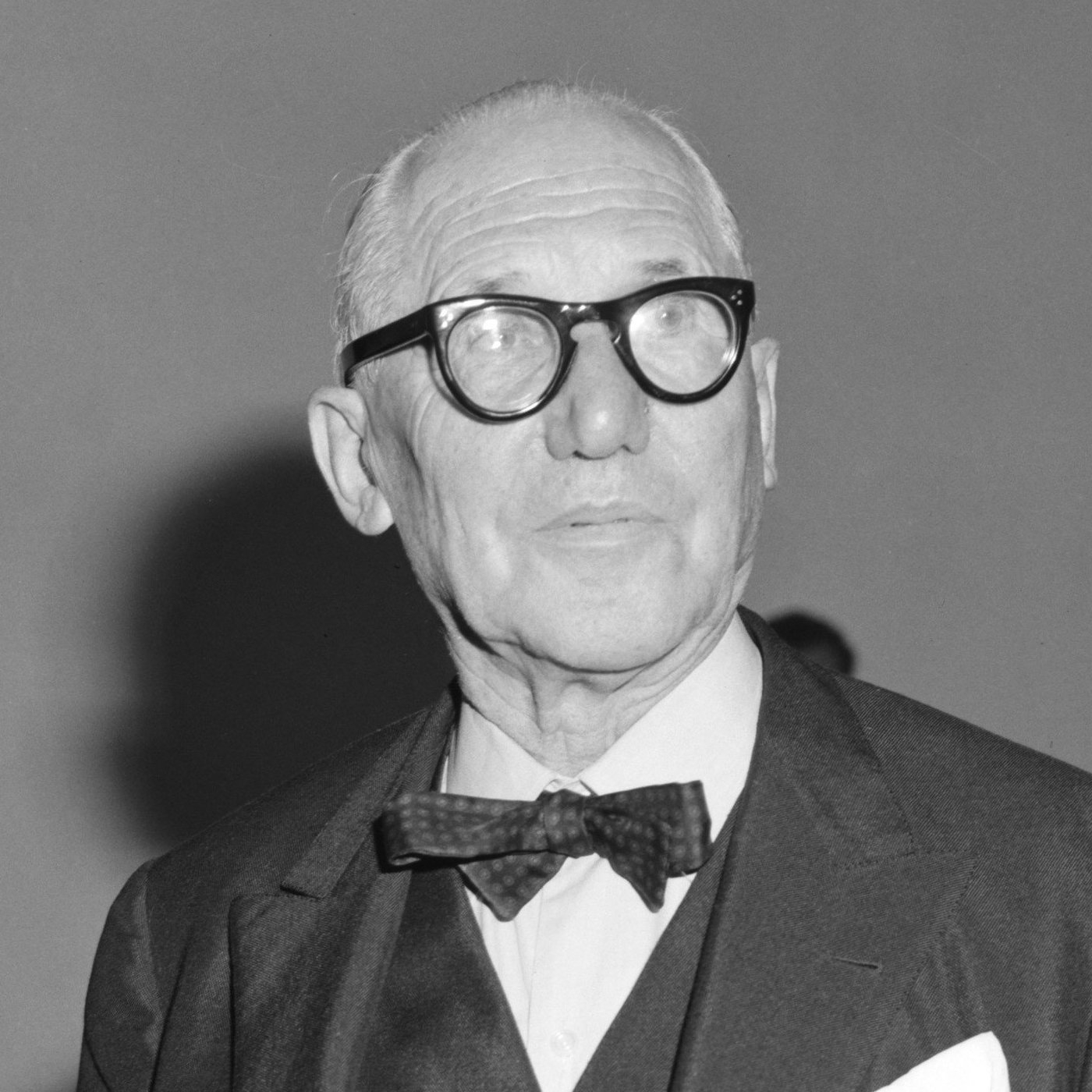
  Le Corbusier
- Richard Leplastrier (1939–), Australian architect.
- Gabriel Manigault (1758–1809), American architect, descendant of Pierre Manigault from La Rochelle.
- Daniel Marot (1661–1752), architect and furniture designer, ancestor of actress Audrey Hepburn.
- Gottfried Semper (1803–1879), German architect, art critic.
- Samuel Sanders Teulon (1812–1873), British Victorian Architect.
- John E. Tourtellotte (1869–1939), American architect.

== Artists ==
- Henry Barraud (1811–1874), British portrait, subject, and animal painter.
- Francis Barraud (1856–1924), English painter, best known for his painting His Master's Voice.
- Frédéric Auguste Bartholdi (1834–1904), French sculptor, designer of the Statue of Liberty (French Lutheran).
- Earl W. Bascom (1906–1995), American artist, sculptor, rodeo cowboy, descendant of Robert Bascom.
- Frédéric Bazille (1841–1870), French Impressionist painter.
- Jean Bellette (1908–1991), Tasmanian artist.
- Samuel Bernard (1615–1687), French artist.
- Abraham Bosse (1604–1676), artist, printmaker.
- Sébastien Bourdon (1616–1671), French painter.
- Hablot Knight Browne ("Phiz") (1815–1882), British illustrator of Charles Dickens.
- Louis Buvelot (1814–1888), Swiss-born Australian artist and photographer.
- Mary Cassatt, French-American impressionist painter.
- Harold Cazneaux (1878–1953), Australian photographer.
- Louis Chéron (1660–1725), artist.
- Maximilian Colt (died 1641), sculptor.
- Jacques d'Agar (1640–1715), artist.
- Jean de Beauchesne (1538–1620), calligrapher.
- William De Morgan, British art potter, tile designer, author.
- François Dubois (c. 1529–1584), French artist.
- Gainsborough Dupont (1754–1797), artist, nephew of Thomas Gainsborough.
- Townsend Duryea (1823–1888), American photographer.
- Benjamin Duterrau (1767–1851), English-born Tasmanian artist.
- Robert Du Val (1639–1732), painter.
- Isaac Gosset (1713–1799), wax sculptor.
- Esther Inglis (1571–1624), calligrapher.
- Pierre-Antoine Labouchère (1807–1873), painter.
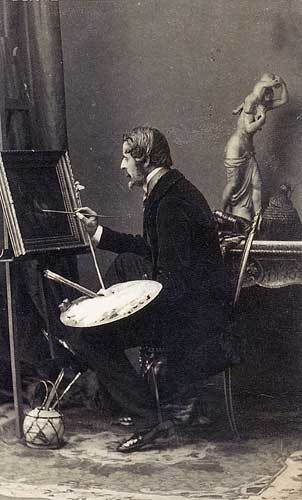
  Pierre-Antoine Labouchère
- François Morellon la Cave (1696–1768), French artist.
- Victor Lardent (1905–1968), British advertising designer who drew Times New Roman.
- Louis Laguerre (1663–1721), decorative painter.
- Marcellus Laroon (1653–1702), artist.
- Marcellus Laroon the Younger (1679–1772), artist.
- Max Leenhardt (1853–1941), French artist.
- Jacques Le Moyne (1533–1588), French artist, explorer (Laudonniere expedition).
- Hubert Le Sueur (1580–1658), sculptor.
- Jean-Étienne Liotard (1702–1789), Swiss painter.
- Jeanne Lombard (1865–1945), French painter.
- Adolph Menzel (1815–1905), artist.
- Philip Mercier (1689–1760), portrait painter.
- Jean Michelin (1616–1670), artist, son of Jean Michelin the First and nephew of Girault Michelin.
- John Everett Millais (1829–1896), British artist.
- Louise Moillon (1610–1696), French artist, daughter of Nicolas Moillon.
- Karl Oenike (1862–1924), German landscape painter
- Isaac Oliver (1565–1617), ornamental and miniatures painter.
- Bernard Palissy (1510–1589), French potter.
- William Piguenit (1836–1914), Australian landscape artist.
- Anne Pratt (1806–1893), botanical illustrator.
- Barthélemy Prieur (1536–1611), sculptor.
- Frederic Remington, American artist, sculptor
- Louis-François Roubiliac (1702–1762), sculptor.
- Briton Rivière (1840–1920), English artist of Huguenot descent.
- Daniel Riviere (1780–1854), miniaturist and grandfather of Briton Rivière.
- William Riviere (1806–1876), English painter and father of Briton Rivière.
- Jacques Rousseau (1630–1693), artist.
- Daniel Soreau (died 1743), artist and picture restorer.
- John Spencer-Churchill (1909–1992), English painter and sculptor and nephew of Sir Winston Churchill.
- John Tenniel (1820–1914), cartoonist.
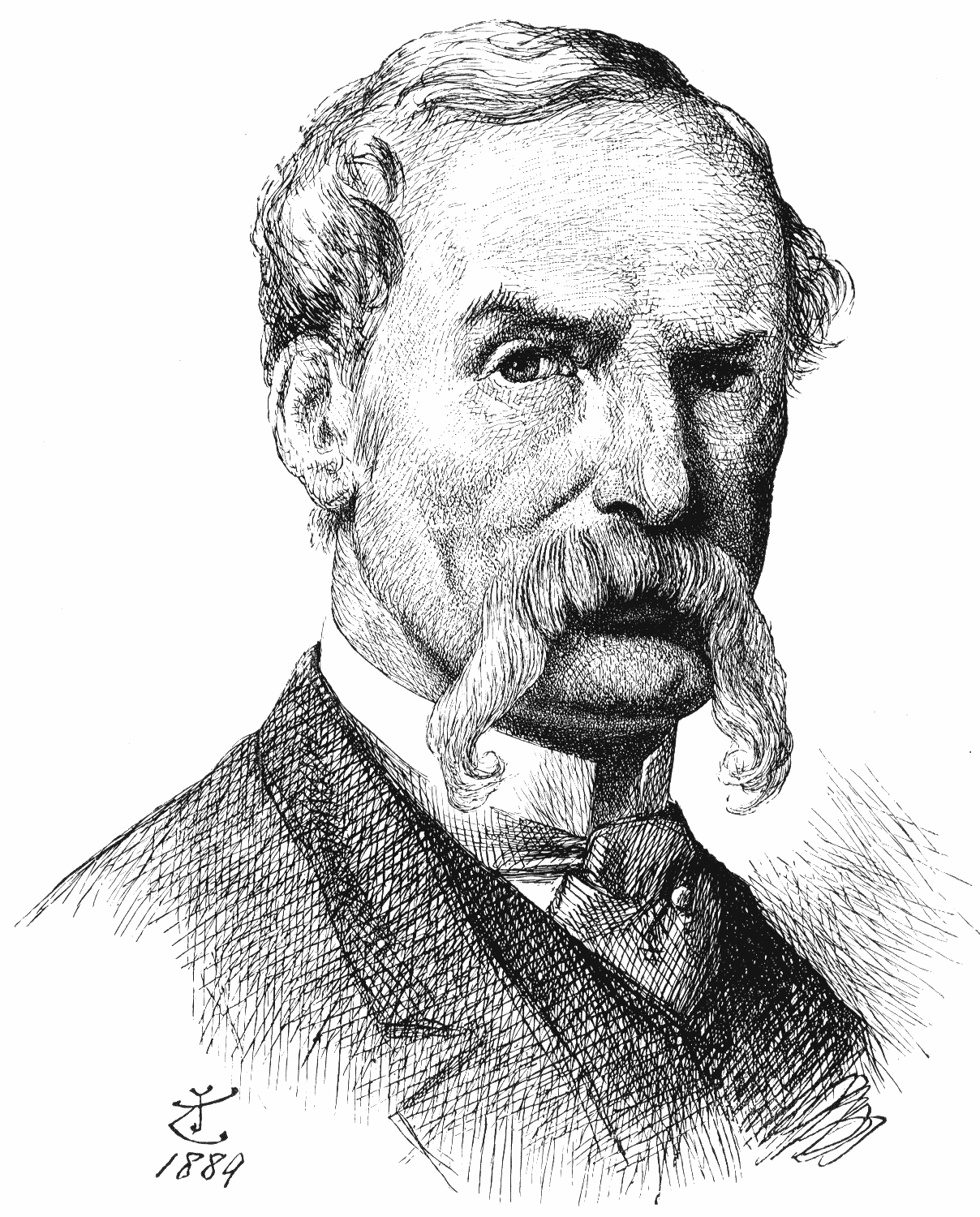
  John Tenniel
- Louis Testelin (1615–1655), French artist.
- Cephas Thompson, American artist, descendant of Mayflower pilgrim Francis Cooke and his Huguenot wife, Hester Mahieu.
- Wilhelm Ferdinand Souchon (1825–1876), German painter specialized in religious and historical subjects and portraits

== Chefs and restaurateurs ==
- Nataniël Le Roux, television food show host.
- Sally Lunn, baker.
- Ian Parmenter (1946–2024), English-born Australian celebrity chef. Key work: Cooking with Passion.
- Alexis Soyer (1810–1858), celebrity chef and philanthropist. Key work: A Shilling Cookery Book for the People.
- Paul Tremo (1733–1810), the head chef at the court of King Stanislaus Augustus Poniatowski of Poland.

== Doctors and medical practitioners ==
- Lou Andreas-Salomé (1861–1937), Russian-born psychoanalyst and author.
- Charles Angibaud, French-born British apothecary.
- Jenny Aubry (1903–1987), French psychiatrist and psychoanalyst from a Protestant-Jewish family and a protege of Jacques Lacan, she was one of the first female doctors to qualify in France. Sister of Louise Weiss and mother of Élisabeth Roudinesco.
- Daniel Bovet (1907–1992), pharmacologist, Nobel Prize winner.
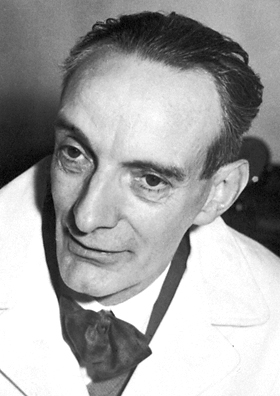
  Daniel Bovet
- Pierre Bovet (1878–1965), psychologist, translator of Boy Scouts guides into French, co-founder of the Rousseau Institute in Geneva, father of Daniel Bovet.
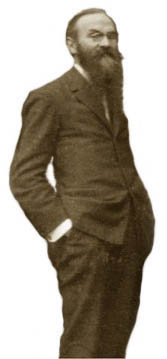
  Pierre Bovet
- Peter Chamberlen, physician, obstetrician, invented delivery via forceps.
- George de Benneville (1702–1793), physician, left Huguenot background for unorthodox religious beliefs.
- Theodore Turquet de Mayerne, physician.
- Campbell De Morgan (1811–1876), British surgeon.
- Antoine Dubois (died 1572), French surgeon, martyr, Saint Bartholomew's Day Massacre.
- Daniel Peter Layard (1721–1802), doctor and midwife.
- John Misaubin, French-born British physician
- Lucie Odier (1886–1984), nurse, member of the International Committee of the Red Cross, expert on relief actions for civilians, outspoken opponent of Nazi Germany.
- Oskar Panizza (1853–1921), psychiatrist, writer and mental patient.
- Ambroise Paré (1509–1590), French surgeon.
- Louis Perrier, physician, mineral water company founder.
- Samuel Pozzi (1846–1918), doctor.
- Paul Reclus (1847–1914), doctor.
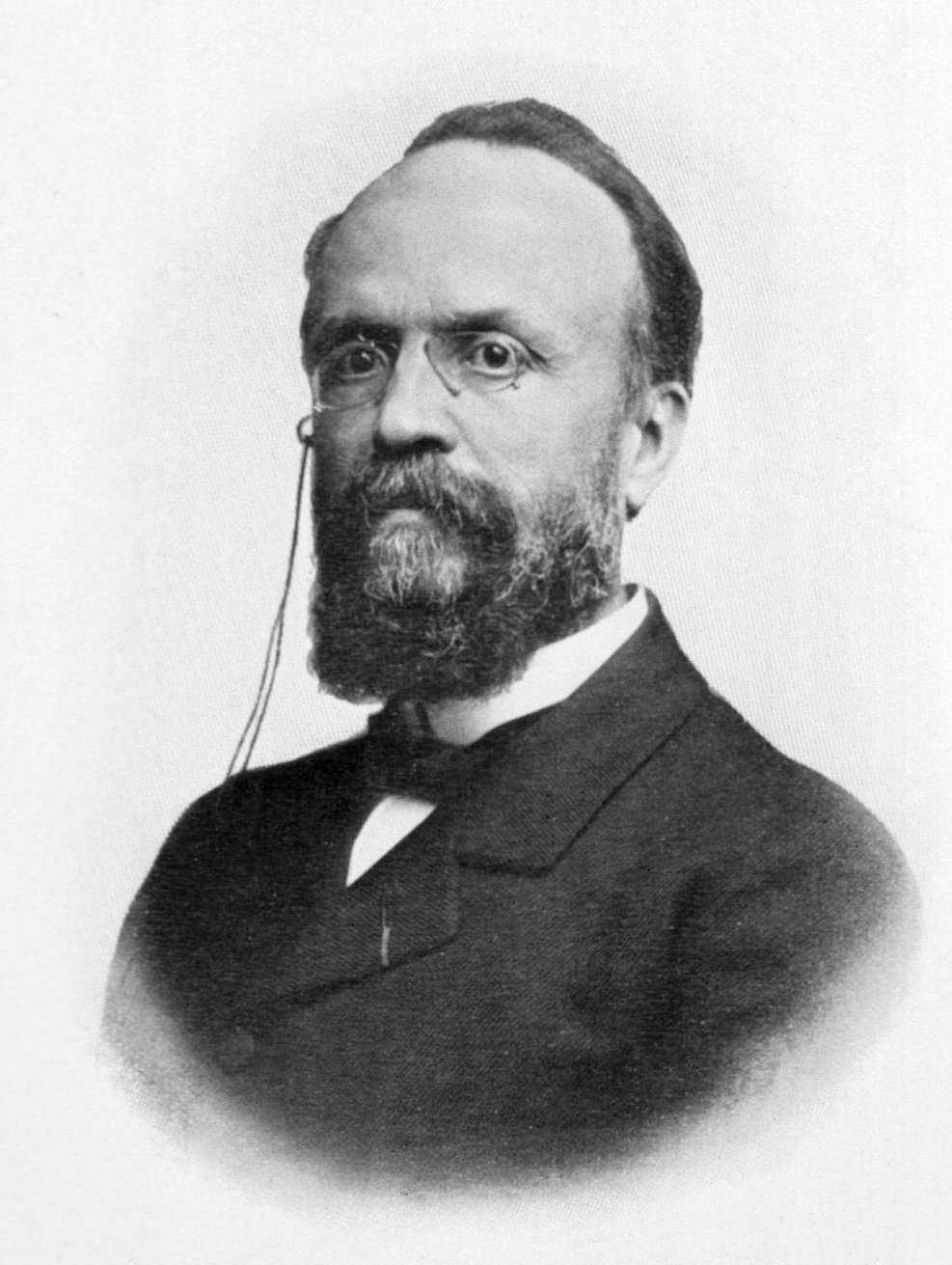
  Paul Reclus
- Élisabeth Roudinesco (1944–), French Protestant-Jewish psychoanalyst, daughter of Jenny Aubry.
- Paul-Louis Simond, medical researcher.
- Raphael Thorius (died 1625), physician and poet.

== Educationalists ==
- John Bascom (1827–1911), American university president, writer.
- Jean Belmain (died after 1557), French scholar, French-language tutor to King Edward VI and Queen Elizabeth I.
- Anthony Benezet (1713–1784), American Quaker educator and abolitionist, from Saint-Quentin.
- Jacques Bongars (1554–1612), scholar.
- David Renaud Boullier (1699–1759), Dutch theologian.
- James Bowdoin III (1752–1811), founder of Bowdoin College.
- Ferdinand Buisson (1841–1932), educator, academic, pacifist, Nobel Peace Prize winner.
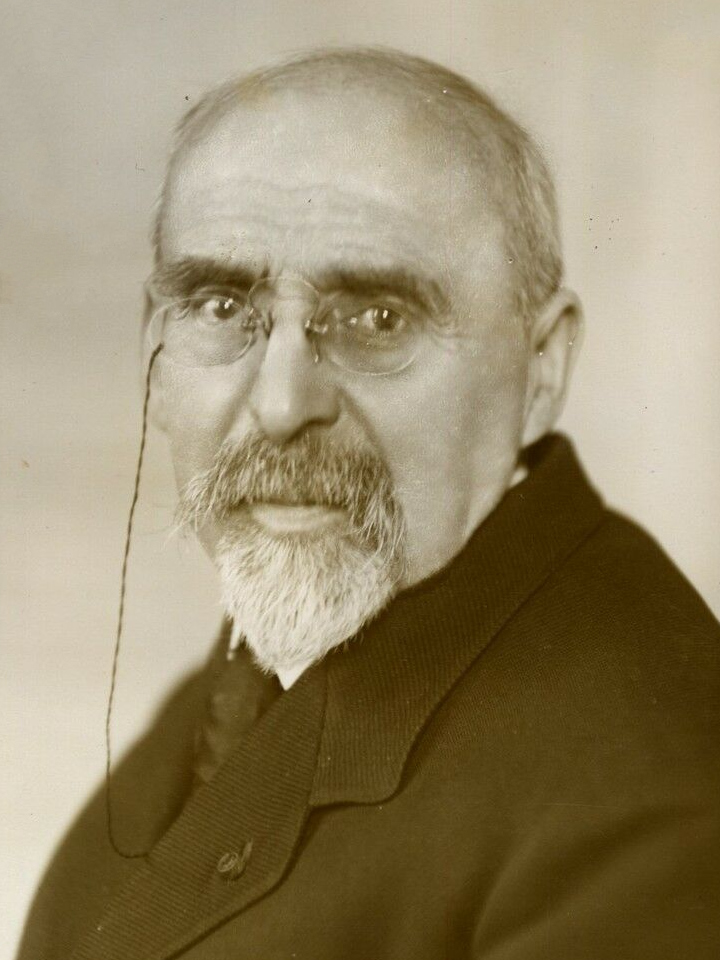
  Ferdinand Buisson
- Isaac Casaubon, scholar.
- Méric Casaubon (1599–1671), scholar, translator, Anglican minister, son of Isaac Casaubon.
- Pierre Courthial, founding dean, Faculté Jean Calvin, Aix-en-Provence.
- Daniel de Superville (1696–1773), founder of the University of Erlangen.
- Reinhart Dozy (1820–1883), academic at Leiden.
- Esther Duflo (1972–), French economist, winner of the Nobel Prize for Economics.
- Charles Gide (1847–1932), French economist and pacifist.
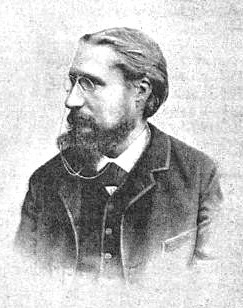
  Charles Gide
- Clarisse Herrenschmidt (1946–), archaeologist, historian, philologist, journalist, and linguist.
- Austen Henry Layard (1817–1894), English Assyriologist, traveller, cuneiformist, art historian, draughtsman, collector, politician, diplomat and President of the Huguenot Society of Great Britain.
- Augustin Marlorat (1506–1562), theologian and martyr.
- David Martin (1639–1721), French theologian.
- Frédéric Passy (1822–1912), French economist, author and pacifist who was a founding member of several peace societies, joint winner of the Nobel Peace Prize in 1901 for his work in the European peace movement, a convert to Protestantism from Roman Catholicism.
- Daniel Patte, French-American theologian.
- Félix Pécaut (1828–1898), educationalist, founder of the Ecole Normale Supérieure de Fontenay-aux-Roses, and pacifist.
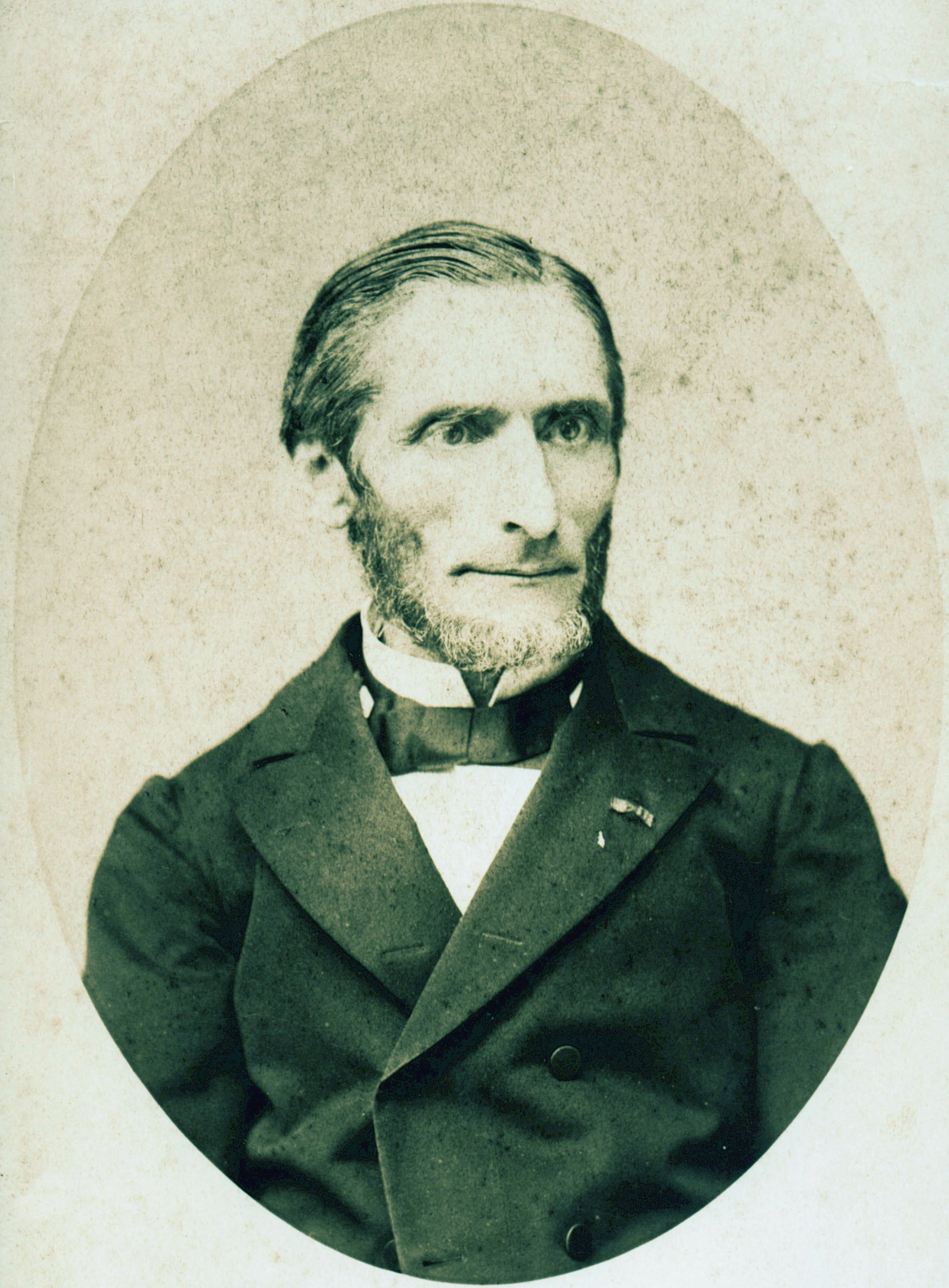
  Félix Pécaut
- Arthur Cecil Pigou, English economist.
- Évelyne Sullerot (1924–2017), sociologist.

== Entertainers, performers, composers and film-makers ==
- James Agee (1909–1955), American screenwriter, Pulitzer Prize-winning author.
- Marc Allégret (1900–1973), Film-maker, son of Protestant missionary Elie Allégret.
- Yves Allégret (1905–1987), French film-maker, pacifist, son of Protestant missionary Elie Allégret.
- René Allio (1924–1995), French film-maker.
- Cecilia Maria Barthélemon (1767–1859), opera singer and composer, daughter of François-Hippolyte Barthélémon.
- François Hippolyte Barthélémon (1741–1808), composer of operas, masques, symphonies, chamber music and hymns (Awake my soul, and with the sun, Mighty God While Angels Bless Thee), from Bordeaux.
- Anna Bishop (1810–1884), English operaric soprano, aunt of Briton Riviere, believed to be the inspiration for the title character in George du Maurier's Trilby.
- Humphrey Bogart (1899–1957), American actor, descended from Huguenot refugees in the Netherlands.
- Dion Boucicault (1820–1890), Irish actor and playwright.
- Loys Bourgeois (1510–1559), Psalm music composer (the "Old 100th").
- Marlon Brando (1924–2004), American actor, descended from Chretien DuBois of the Comté of Coupigny, near Lille in Artois.
- Edmond Louis Budry (1854–1932), hymnwriter ("Thine Be the Glory").
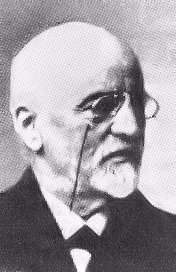
  Edmond Louis Budry
- Godfrey Cass (1867–1951), Australian actor, descendant of the Castieau family.
- Christopher Cazenove (1943–2010), English actor.
- Timothée Chalamet (1995–), French-American actor.
- Charlie Chaplin (1889–1977), British actor, likely to have had Huguenot ancestry but this has not yet been fully confirmed.
- Cyd Charisse (1921–2008), American actress and dancer.
- Jessica Chastain (1977–), American actress, Academy Award winner for Best Actress 2022, descended from Dr Pierre Chastain who came from near the village of Chârost (his family had earlier lived in Bourges).
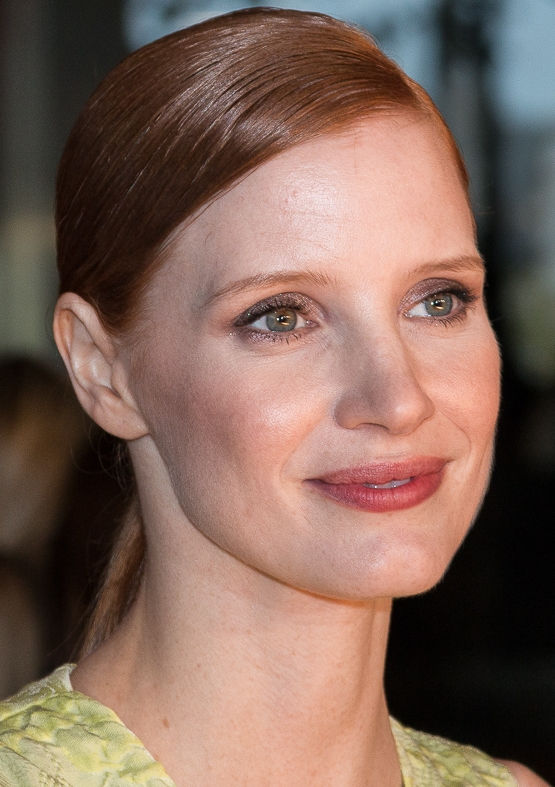
  Jessica Chastain
- Charles Chauvel (1897–1959), Australian film-maker, ancestors from Blois in the Loire Valley.
- William Christopher (1932–2016), American actor.
- George Clooney (1961–), American actor, nephew of Rosemary Clooney, descended from the Koch family of Alsace-Lorraine.
- Rosemary Clooney (1928–2002), American jazz and Hollywood musicals singer and actress, descended from the Koch family of Alsace-Lorraine.
- Olivia Colman (1974–), English actress, descended from Anne Foissin of Paris.
- Alice Cooper (real name Vincent Damon Furnier) (1948–), American heavy metal singer and born-again Christian.
- Gary Cooper (1901–1961), American actor, descended from the Brazier family.
- Daniel Craig (1968–), English actor, descended from Pastor Daniel Chamier of Le Mont, near Mocas, west of Grenoble. (Chamier's father, in turn, came from Avignon.)
- Joan Crawford (1905–1977), American actress, descended from the Huguenots, Dr Pierre Chastain and Chretien DuBois, on her father's side.
- Konstanze Dahn (real name Constanze Le Gaye) (1814–1894), German actress.
- Bette Davis (1908–1989), American actress, descended from the Favor family. on her mother's side.
- Jean Delannoy (1908–2008), French actor, film editor, screenwriter and film director.
- Paschal de l'Estocart (1538–1587), Psalm music composer.
- Cara Delevingne (1992–), English actress and model, French Huguenot ancestry.
- Poppy Delevingne (1986–), English actress and model, sister of Cara, French Huguenot ancestry.
- Cecil B. DeMille (1881–1959), American film-maker.
- Johnny Depp (1963–), American actor, descended from Jean and Pierre Dieppe of Dieppe, Normandy.
- Lily-Rose Depp (1999–), actress, model, daughter of Johnny Depp, descended from Jean and Pierre Dieppe of Dieppe, Normandy.
- Louis de Rochemont (1899–1978), filmmaker.
- Richard de Rochemont (1903–1982), filmmaker.
- Emil Devrient (1803–1876), German actor.
- Ludwig Devrient (1784–1832), German actor.
- Brandon deWilde (1942–1972), American actor.
- Brooke D'Orsay (1982–), Canadian actress.
- Gerald du Maurier (1873–1934), English actor.
- Tilla Durieux (1880–1971), Austrian actress.
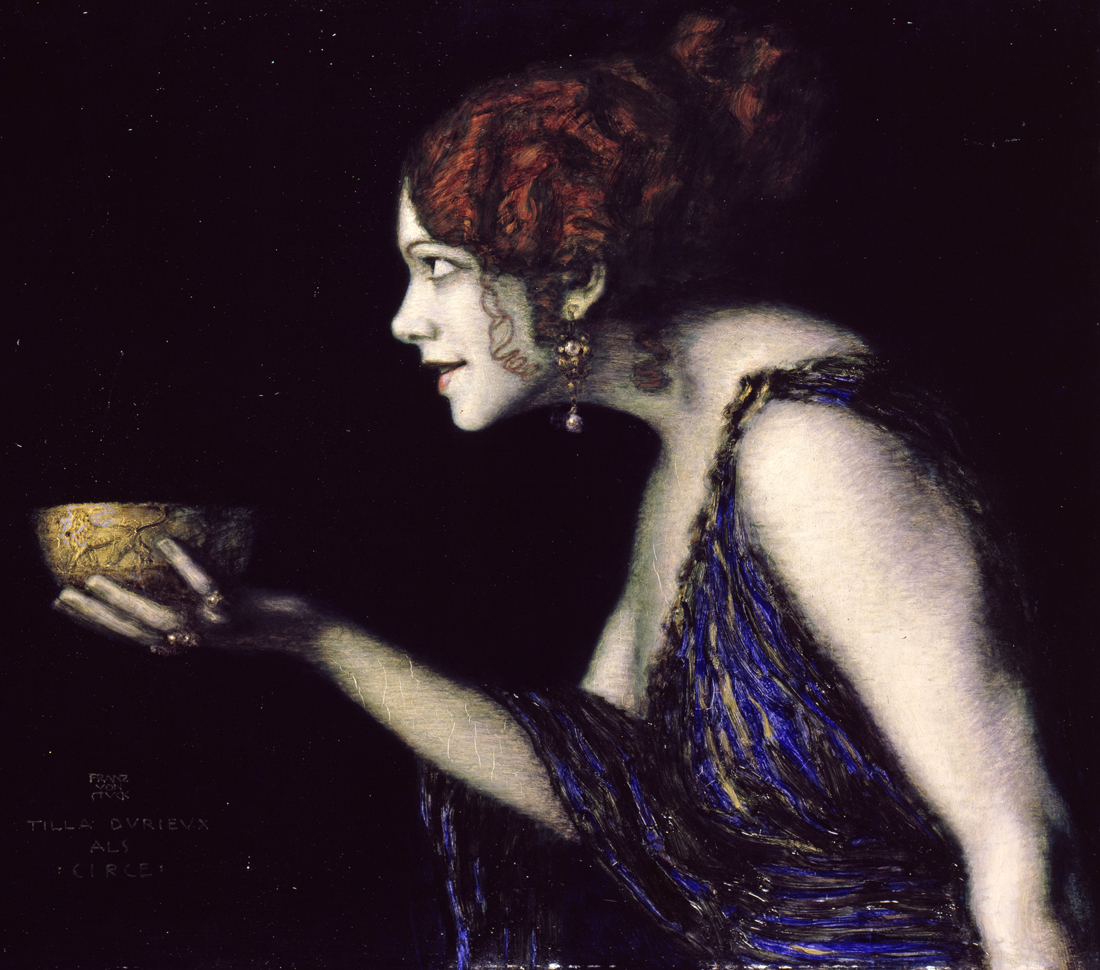
  Tilla Durieux
- Ampie du Preez (1982–), South African singer-songwriter.
- Elize du Toit (1980–), South African actress.
- Wikus du Toit (1972–), South African actor and comedian.
- Robert Duvall (1931–2026), actor, descended from Mareen Duvall of Nantes.
- Brian Eno (1948–), English music producer, ambient musician, atheist, descended from the Hennot family of Mons, Flanders.
- Johnny Fourie, South African jazz guitarist.
- Guillaume Franc (1505–1571), Psalm music composer.
- Judy Garland (1922–1969), American jazz and Hollywood musicals singer and actress, French Huguenot ancestry on her father's side.
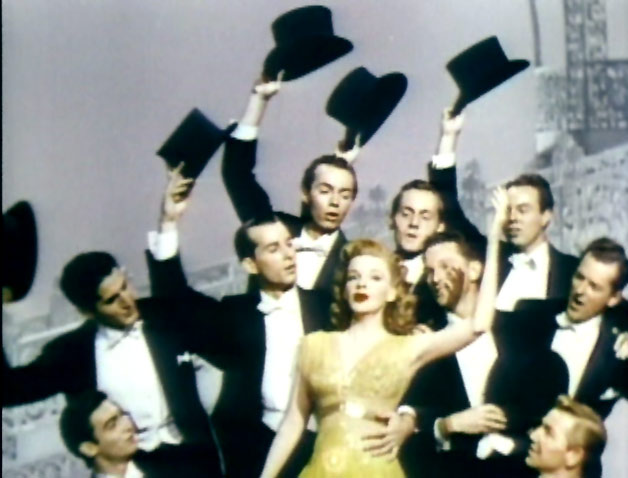
  Judy Garland
- David Garrick (1717–1779), English theatre actor and playwright, descendant of David de la Garrique from near Saintonge.
- Richard Gere, American actor, descendant of Mayflower pilgrim Francis Cooke and his Huguenot wife, Hester Mahieu.
- Kendji Girac (1996–), French pop and flamenco musician.
- Jean-Luc Godard (1930–2022), French film director and film critic, related to the Monod family.
- Claude Goudimel (1520–1572), composer of musical settings for the Psalms (Genevan Psalter), martyr (Saint Bartholomew's Day Massacre).
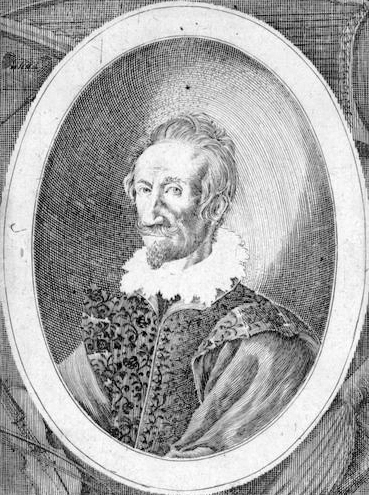
  Claude Goudimel
- Nikolaus Harnoncourt (1939–2016), Austrian conductor.
- Audrey Hepburn (1929–1993), Belgian-born British actress and humanitarian, descended from Daniel Marot of Paris.
- Werner Herzog (1942–), German film director.
- Hozier (1990–), Irish blues, and rock musician, Huguenot ancestry on his mother's side.
- André Isoir (1935–2016), classical organist.
- Eddie Izzard, English comedian, actor, family thought to originate in the Pyrenees.
- Derek Jacobi (1938–), English actor, descended from the financier Joseph de la Plaigne of Bordeaux.
- Julian Jarrold (1960–), English film-maker, descended from the prominent Jarrold's family of Norwich, known for the department store and publishing businesses, family of Huguenot or Dutch descent.
- Dakota Johnson (1989–), American actress and model, daughter of Don Johnson.
- Don Johnson (1949–), American actor.
- Quincy Jones (1933–2024), American jazz and blues composer and record producer, descended from the Lanier family.
- Val Kilmer (1959–2025), American actor.
- Alice Krige (1954–), South African actress.
- Christian Ignatius Latrobe (1758–1836), British clergyman, composer and musician, whose ancestors came from Languedoc.
- Nicholas Lanier (1588–1666), Master of the King's Musick.
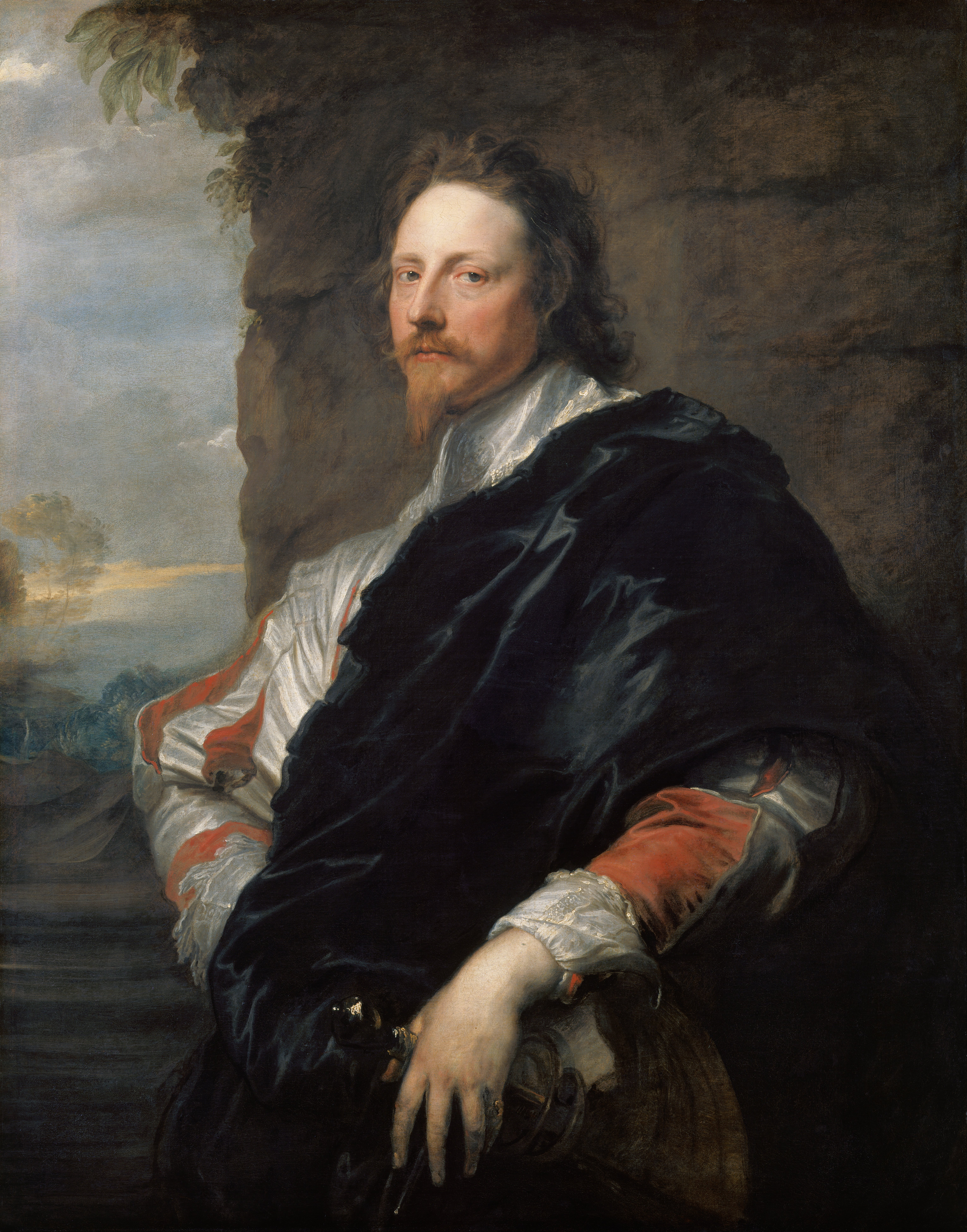
  Nicholas Lanier
- Ethel Lavenu (1842–1917), British actress, mother of Tyrone Power and grandmother of Tyrone Power junior, descended from the Huguenots, Hector Francois Chataigner de Cramahé and Salomon Blosset de Loche, both of whom fought for William of Orange.
- Simon Le Bon (1958–), English musician and frontman of pop-rock band Duran Duran.
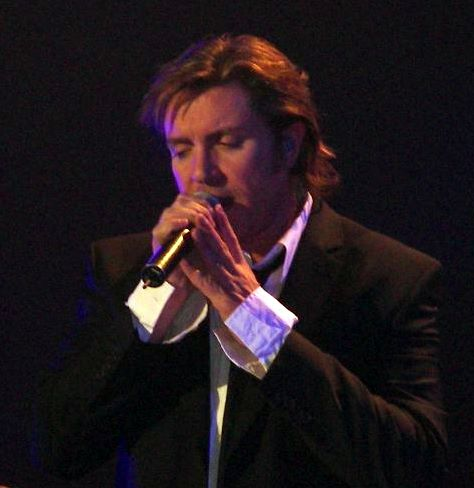
  Simon Le Bon
- Claudin Le Jeune (1530–1600), composer and music publisher of the Genevan Psalter, from Valenciennes.
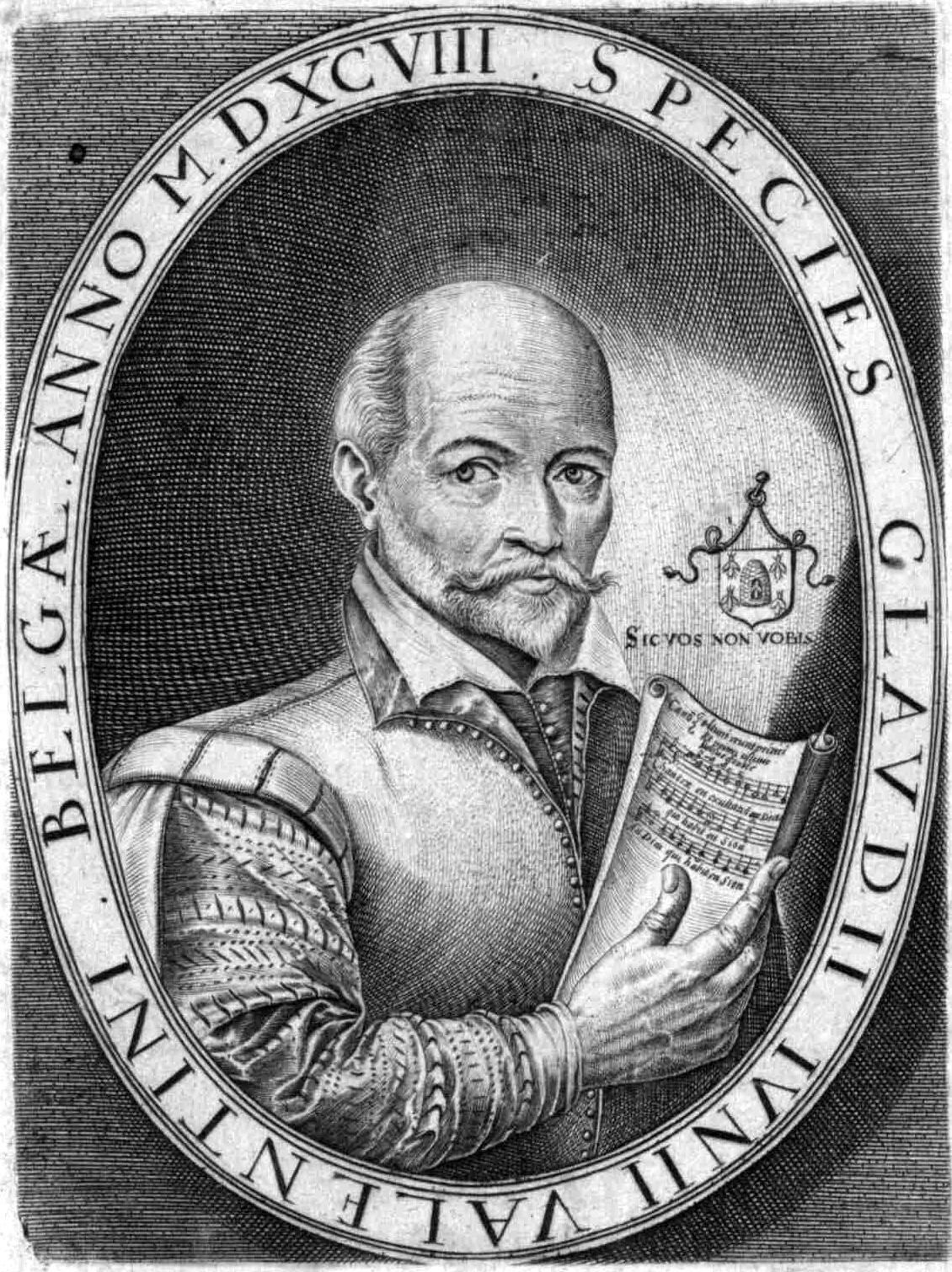
  Claudin Le Jeune
- Bill Le Sage (1927–2001), British jazz musician, descendant of a Valenciennes journeyman silkweaver, Jacques Le Sage, and his son, also a journeyman silkweaver, Pierre Le Sage (born Leiden, died Spitalfields, married into the Le Grand family of Saint-Quentin. Later Le Sage descendants in Spitalfields married with the Levesques, weavers originally from Bolbec, and with the Le Maréchals of Caen. (One branch of this Le Sage family later emigrated to Australia whilst another branch went to the Philadelphia-New Jersey area in the United States.)
- Hal LeSueur (1903–1963), American actor and the brother of actress, Joan Crawford.
- Zachary Levi (real name: Zachary Pugh) (1980–), American actor and practising Christian, descended from François De Puy of Calais.
- Andrew Lincoln (1973–), English actor.
- Jean-Bernard Logier (1777–1846), composer who developed a system of musical notation.
- Lorna Luft (1952–), American jazz and Hollywood musicals singer and actress, daughter of Judy Garland.
- César Malan (1787–1864), hymnwriter ("Everyday I Will Bless You", "It Is Not Death to Die", "O Holy Spirit Blessed Comforter", "What Are the Pleasures of the World?" and "My Saviour's Praises I Will Sing"), originator of the modern hymn movement in the French Reformed Church, pastor and novelist.
- Clément Marot (1496–1544), poet who versified the Psalms into French (Genevan Psalter).
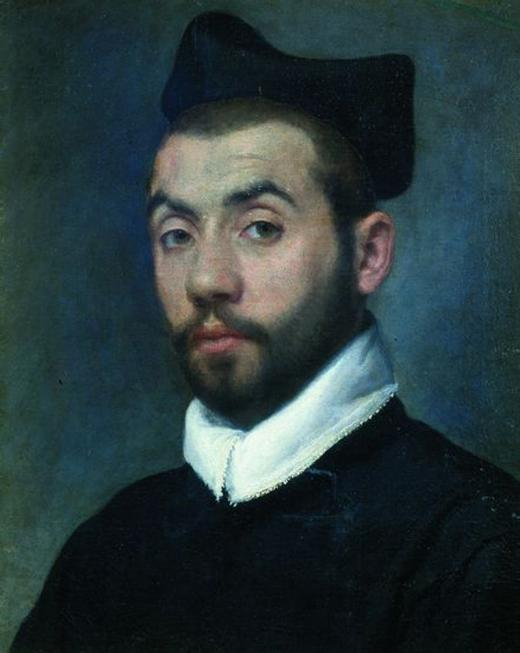
  Clément Marot
- Liza Minnelli (1946–), American jazz and Hollywood musicals singer and actress, daughter of Judy Garland.
- Jacques-Louis Monod (1927–2020), pianist, composer and teacher.
- Laurence Olivier (1907–1989), English actor, descendant of Pastor Jerome Olivier, chaplain to the Prince of Orange, family originally from Nay in the Pyrenees.
- Valerie Perrine (1943–2026), American actress, descended from Daniel Perrin of Normandy.
- Jon Pertwee (1919–1996), English actor, descended from the Perthuis de Laillevault family of Provence.
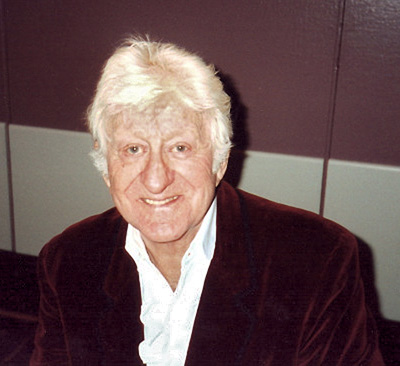
  Jon Pertwee
- Michael Pertwee (1916–1991), playwright and screenwriter, son of Roland Pertwee and brother of Jon Pertwee, descendant of the Perthuis de Laillevault family of Provence.
- Roland Pertwee (1885–1963), playwright and screenwriter, father of Jon Pertwee and Michael Pertwee, descended from the Perthuis de Laillevault family of Provence.
- Sean Pertwee (1964–), English actor, son of Jon Pertwee, descended from the Perthuis de Laillevault family of Provence.
- Joaquin Phoenix (1974–), American actor, distant French Huguenot ancestry on his father's side.
- River Phoenix (1970–1993), American actor, brother of Joaquin Phoenix.
- Tyrone Power (1914–1958), actor, descended from the Lavenu and Blossett families.
- Tyrone Power, Sr. (1869–1931), actor, descended from the Lavenu and Blossett families.
- Jean-Jacques Quesnot de La Chênée (died 1708), French librettist and theatre manager who staged Lully operas for Huguenot refugee community.
- André Raison (1640–1719), French Baroque composer and organist.
- Kate Raison (1962–), Australian actress
- Miranda Raison (1977–), English screen and stage actress.
- Robert Redford (1936–2025), American actor, descended from Philippe de La Noye (Philip Delano) of the Leiden Huguenot refugee community (the family originated in Lannoy, near Tourcoing).
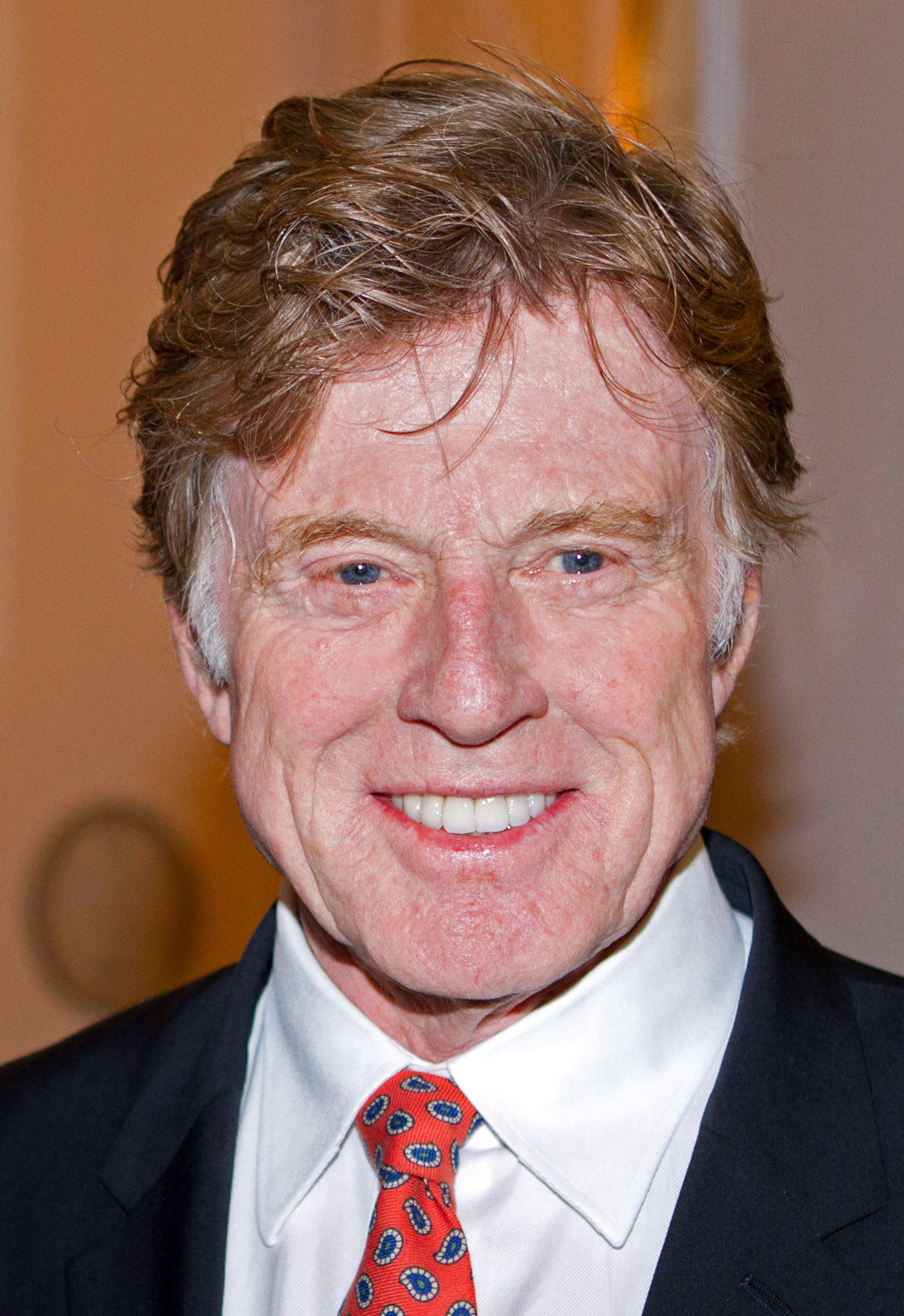
  Robert Redford
- David Reinhardt, jazz guitarist, grandson of Django Reinhardt.
- Renaud (1952–), pop-rock singer, anti-military activist, agnostic from a Protestant family.
- Keith Richards (1943–), English blues and rock guitarist, descended from the Dupree family of silkweavers.
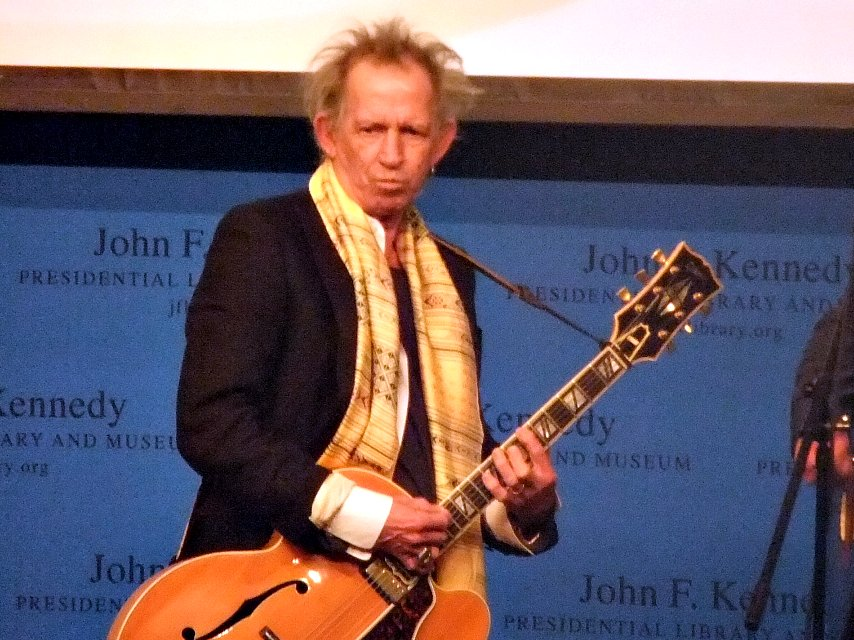
  Keith Richards
- André Rieu (1949–) Dutch violinist, descendant of the Rieu family of the Auvergne.
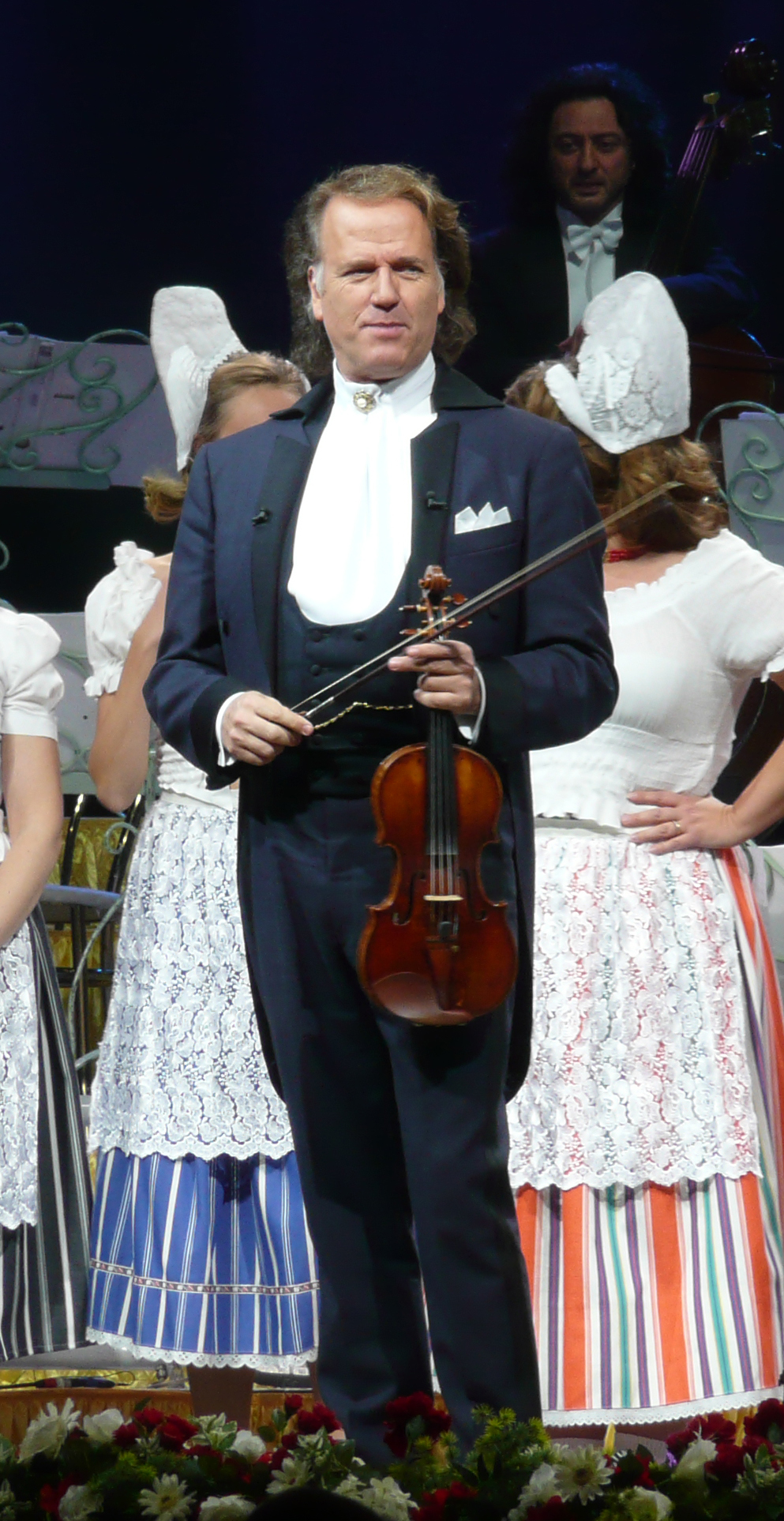
  André Rieu
- Ruben Saillens (1855–1942), Huguenot-born Baptist pastor, leader of the Evangelical Mission Populaire and hymn writer (Torrents d'amour et de grâce, La Cevenole).
- Julia Sawalha (1968–) and Nadia Sawalha (1964–), British actresses of Huguenot and Jordanian ancestry, descended from a Norman silkweaver, Daniel Duboc.
- Jérôme Seydoux, head of Pathé, head of Charges Réunies, shareholder in Olympique Lyonnais Football Club.
- Léa Seydoux (1985–), French actress, patron of the charity Empire des enfants, atheist member of the Protestant Schlumberger and Seydoux families.
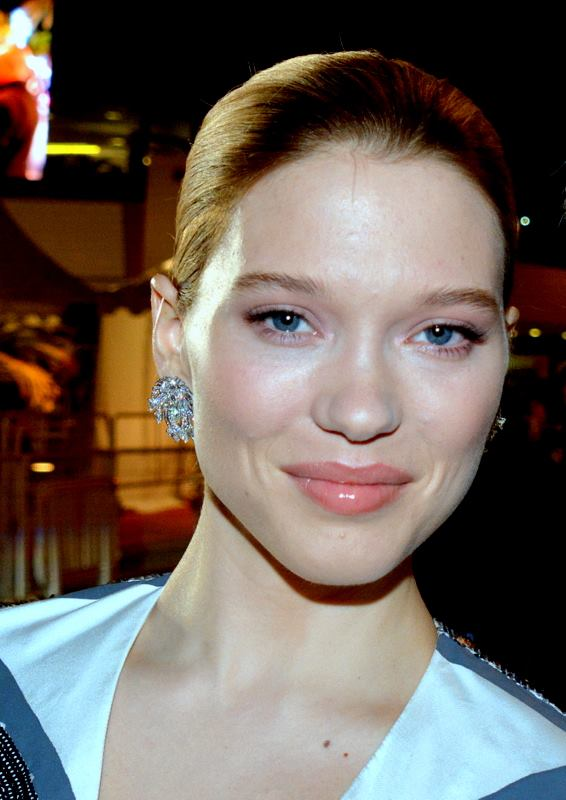
  Léa Seydoux
- Delphine Seyrig (1932–1990), actress and film-maker, member of an intellectual Protestant family from Alsace.
- Nigel Terry (1945–2015), English actor.
- Charlize Theron (1975–), South African actress, descended from the pioneering South African farmer, Jacques Therond, originally of Nîmes, Languedoc.
- David Thewlis (1963–), English actor.
- Mary Travers (1936–2009), American pop singer, member of the group Peter, Paul and Mary.
- Jimmie Vaughan (1951–), American blues guitarist, brother of Stevie Ray Vaughan, descended from the LaRue family.
- Stevie Ray Vaughan (1954–1990), American blues guitarist, descended from the LaRue family and the Joquen and DuFour families.
- Hermann Vezin (1829–1910), American actor.
- Isaac Watts (1674–1748), hymnwriter ("When I Survey the Wondrous Cross", "Joy to the World" and "Our God, Our Help in Ages Past"), pastor and theologian, descended from the Taunton family. Key work: Logic, or the Right Use of Reason, in the Inquiry After Truth.
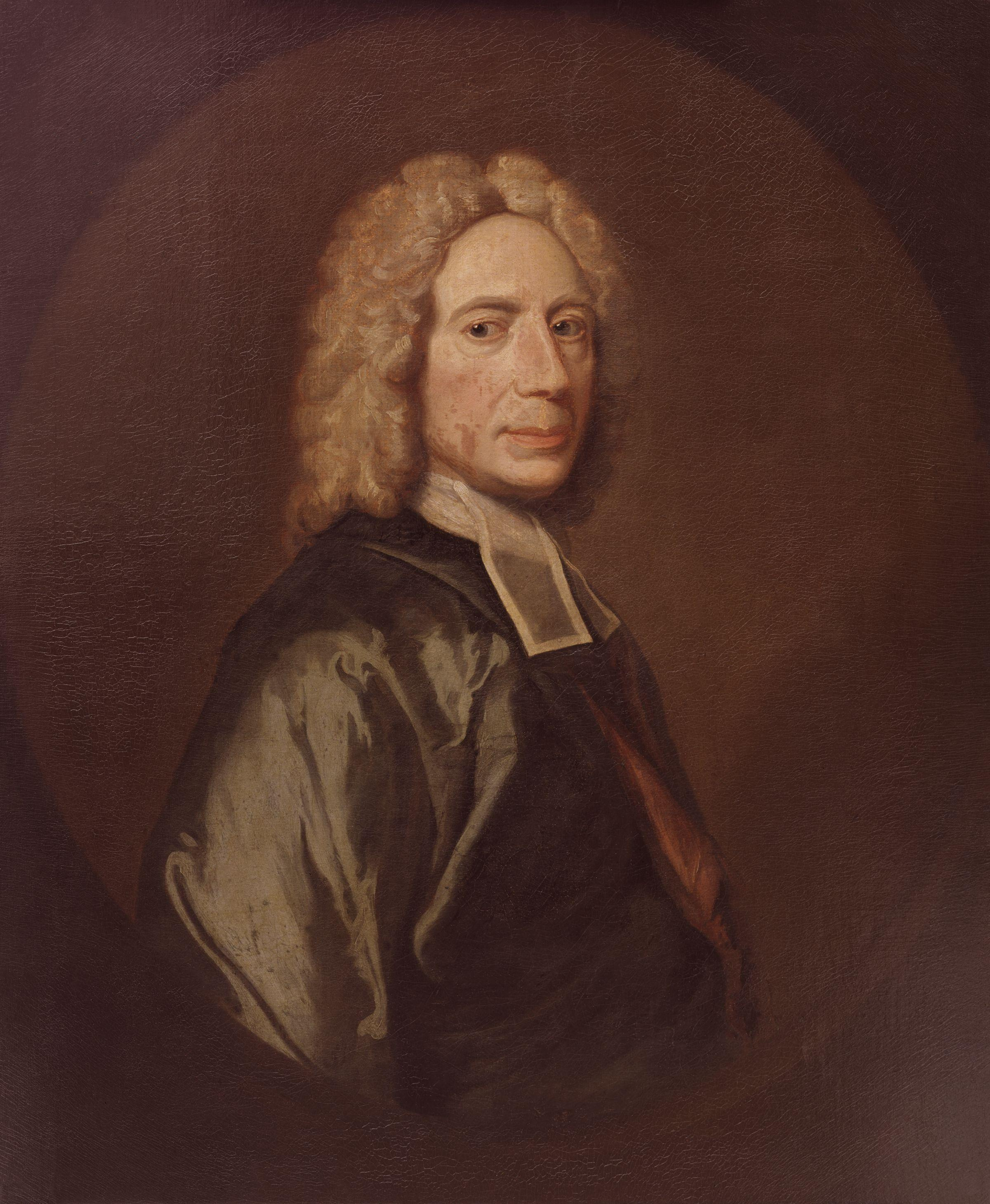
  Isaac Watts
- Orson Welles, American actor and director, descendant of Mayflower pilgrim Francis Cooke and his Huguenot wife, Hester Mahieu.
- Wil Wheaton (1972–), American actor, atheist with distant Huguenot ancestry from Montserrat on his mother's side.
- Brian Wilson, American pop musician (Beach Boys), descendant of Mayflower pilgrim Francis Cooke and his Huguenot wife, Hester Mahieu.
- Carl Wilson, American pop musician (Beach Boys), descendant of Mayflower pilgrim Francis Cooke and his Huguenot wife, Hester Mahieu.
- Dennis Wilson, American pop musician (Beach Boys), descendant of Mayflower pilgrim Francis Cooke and his Huguenot wife, Hester Mahieu.
- Joanne Woodward (1930–), American actress and philanthropist, descended from the Gignilliat family of Switzerland.

== Entrepreneurs and businesspeople ==
- Karl Benz (1844–1929), German inventor.
- Scott Bessent, US Treasury Secretary, investor, hedge fund manager.
- Charles Bosanquet, merchant.
- James Whatman Bosanquet (1804–1877), English banker and theologian. (Key work: Messiah the Prince, or the Inspiration of the Prophecies of Daniel.)
- Samuel Bosanquet (1744–1806), English merchant and banker.
- Warren Buffett (1930–), investor, wealthiest person in the world in 1995 and 2008, descendant of Mareen Duvall.
- Delillers Carbonnel (born 1654), banker, son of Guillaume Carbonnel.
- Edward Cazalet (1827–1833), merchant and industrialist, promoter of Zionism.
- Philip Cazenove, stockbroker, philanthropist (supported Jewish domestic charities - Calvinists, religious non-Conformists felt a special affiliation for them as fellow-marginalised people).
- Samuel Courtauld (industrialist) (1793–1881), American-born British industrialist.
- Samuel Courtauld (art collector), grandnephew of the industrialist, businessman, art collector.
- Frederic de Coninck (1740–1811), entrepreneur.
- Robert Champion de Crespigny (1950–), Australian businessman (Normandy Mining).
- Gustaf de Laval, Swedish engineer, inventor.
- Benjamin Delessert (1773–1847), entrepreneur, banker.
- Etienne Delessert (1735–1816), banker.
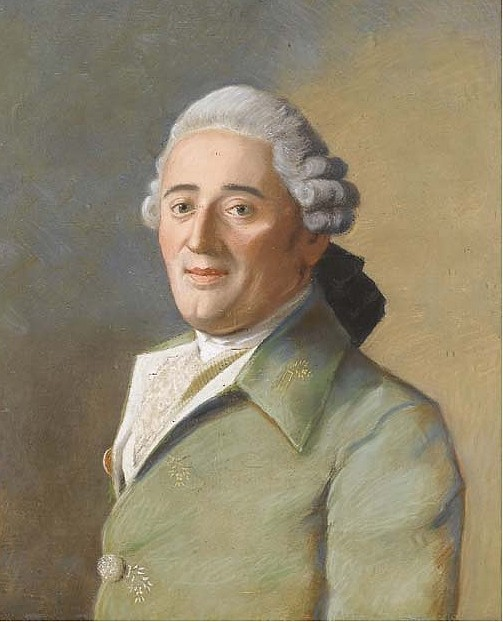
  Étienne Delessert
- François-Marie Delessert (1780–1868), banker and politician, son of Étienne Delessert.
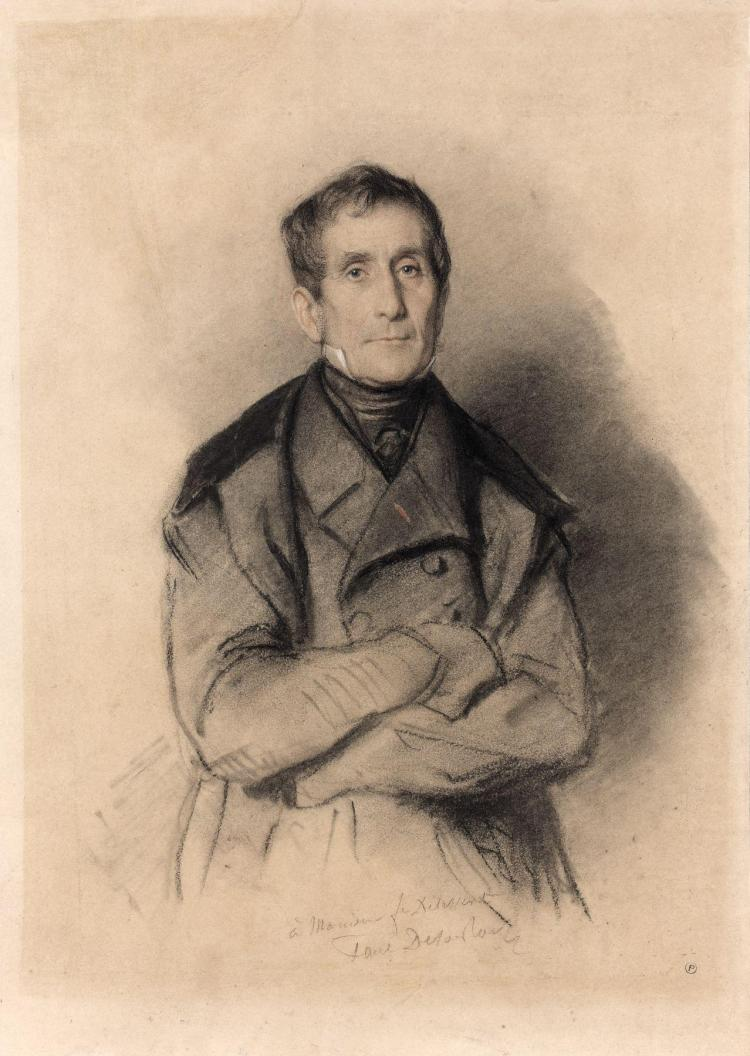
  François-Marie Delessert
- Charles Delevingne (1949–), English property developer, father of Cara and Poppy Delevingne, French Huguenot ancestry.
- Malcolm Delevingne (1868–1950), English civil servant.
- Guillaume Delprat, Dutch-Australian manager of BHP.
- Jean de Neuflize (1850–1928), banker.
- James-Alexandre de Pourtalès (1776–1855) banker.
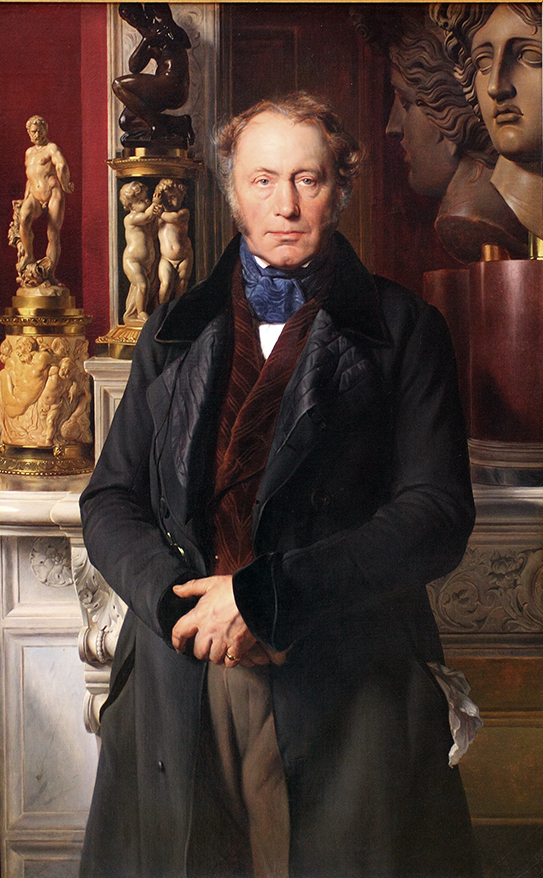
  James-Alexandre de Pourtalès
- E. I. du Pont, founder of the duPont Company (US).
- Peter Faneuil (1700–1743), merchant, slave trader and philanthropist.
- John Minet Fector (1754–1821), Dover shipping magnate, banker, smuggled gold out of England to finance Napoleon Bonaparte. Charles Darnay from Dickens' A Tale of Two Cities is believed to be based on him. Son of Peter Fector.
- Claude Fonnereau (1677–1740), banker, from La Rochelle.
- James Gaultier, banker, from Angoulême.
- King C. Gillette (1855–1932), American safety razor entrepreneur and utopian theorist.
- François Havy (1709–1766), French-born Canadian merchant.
- Thierry Hermès (1801–1878), founder of Hermès fashion chain.
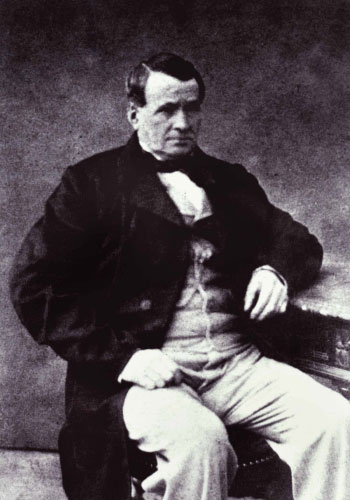
  Thierry Hermès
- Hans-Konrad Hottinger (1764–1841), banker.
- John Houblon (1632–1712), first governor of the Bank of England.
- Howard Hughes, American inventor, industrialist, billionaire
- Leonard Jerome, American financier, grandfather of Winston Churchill.
- André Koechlin, founder of Alstom.
- Robert Ladbroke (1713–1773), merchant banker, politician.
- George Larpent (1786–1855), British businessman.
- Benjamin Henry Latrobe, II, American engineer.
- Henry Laurens, American merchant, delegate to the Continental Congress.
- Jean Lefebvre (1714–1766), French-born, Canadian merchant.
- François Lévesque (1732–1787), French-born Canadian merchant, justice of the peace and politician, of the Lévesque family of weavers originally from Bolbec, Normandy.
- Charles Mallet (1815–1902), banker.
- Gabriel Manigault (1704–1781), American merchant.
- Jean Martell (1694–1753), cognac manufacturer.
- William Minet, merchant, son of Isaac Minet.
- Thomas Papillon (1623–1702), merchant, investor in the East India Company, master of the Mercers' Company.
- Pierre Peschier (1739–1812), banker.
- Armand Peugeot (1849–1914), car manufacturer (French Lutheran).
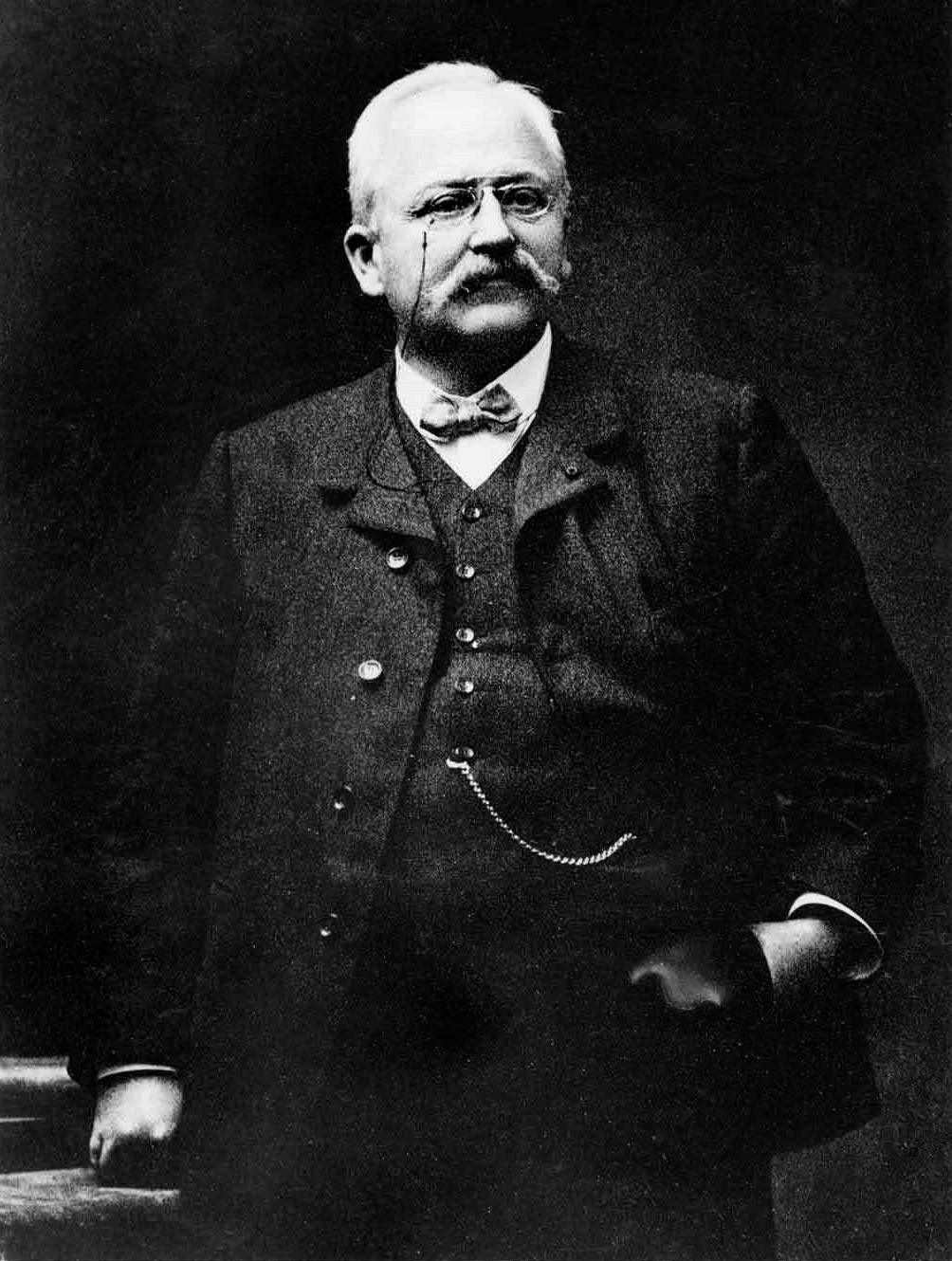
  Armand Peugeot
- Thierry Peugeot (1957–), head of Peugeot supervisory board (French Lutheran).
- John Pintard, American merchant, philanthropist.
- Thomas Ravenel, American real estate developer, politician, reality TV star, son of philanthropist and disabled people's rights activisit, Louise Ravenel Dougherty.
- John D. Rockefeller (1839–1937), American capitalist, descended from the Rochefeuille or Rocquefeuille family.
- Jean-Baptiste Say (1767–1832), French economist, businessman.
- Louis Say (1774–1840), founder of Béghin-Say, brother of the economist, Jean-Baptiste Say.
- Louis Schweitzer (1942–), head of Renault.
- Serge Tchuruk (1937–), head of Alcatel.
- Sam Walton (1918–1992), founder of Walmart and Sam's Club, descendant of Chretien DuBois.
- Obadiah Williams, Irish merchant.

== Farmers ==
- Sir Richard Boyer (1891–1961), Australian pastoralist and chairman of the ABC.
- Olivier de Serres (1539–1619), horticulturalist, peaceworker and ecologist.
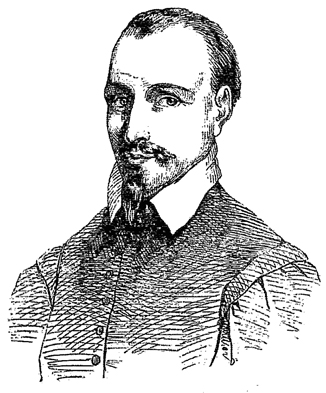
  Olivier de Serres
- Francois du Toit, South African farmer.
- Pierre Joubert (1664–1732), South African viticulturalist.
- Lewis Majendie (1756–1833), English agriculturalist.
- Abel Head Pierce American rancher, descendant of Mayflower pilgrim Francis Cooke and his Huguenot wife, Hester Mahieu.
- Jean Roy, viticulturist who emigrated to South Africa and founded a vineyard there.

== Geographers ==
- Jean Le Clerc, geographer.
- Jean Palairet (1697–1774), French cartographer, French tutor to the children of King George II of the United Kingdom, partly responsible for introducing the game of cricket to the Netherlands.
- Élie Reclus (1827–1904), ethnographer and anarchist, son of Pastor Jacques Reclus.
- Élisée Reclus (1830–1905), geographer and anarchist, son of Pastor Jacques Reclus.
- Onésime Reclus (1837–1916), geographer, son of Pastor Jacques Reclus.
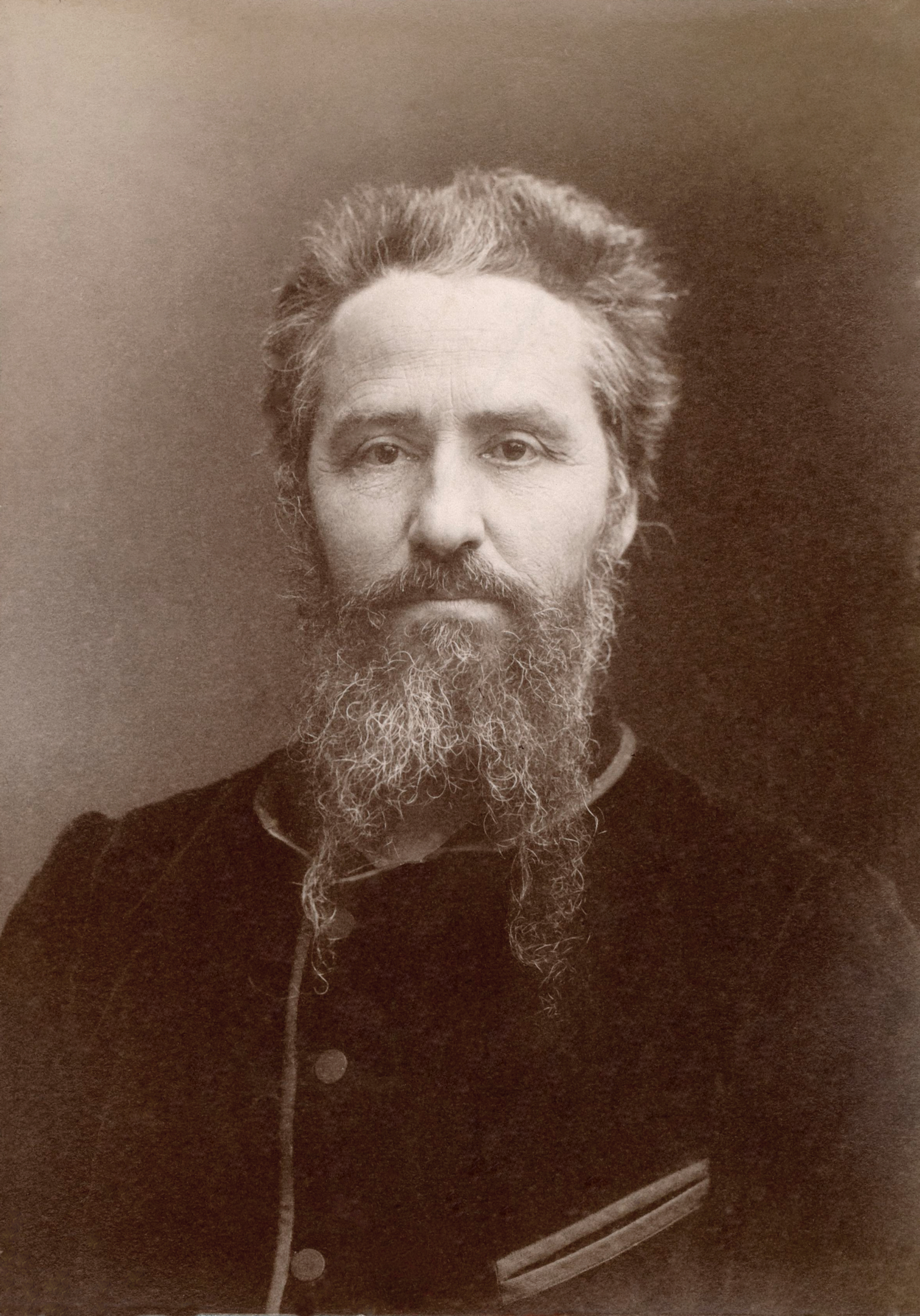
  Onésime Reclus
- John Rocque (1705–1762), cartographer, specialised in mapping of gardens, created plans of British towns and pioneering road guides for travellers.
- Mary Ann Rocque (1725–1770), cartographer, wife of John Rocque, daughter of the Scalé family.

== Historians ==
- Jean Baubérot (1941–), historian.
- Elie Benoist (1640–1728), historian of the Edict of Nantes, pastor.
- Maximilien de Béthune, duc de Sully (1560–1641), memoirist. Key work: Économies royales.
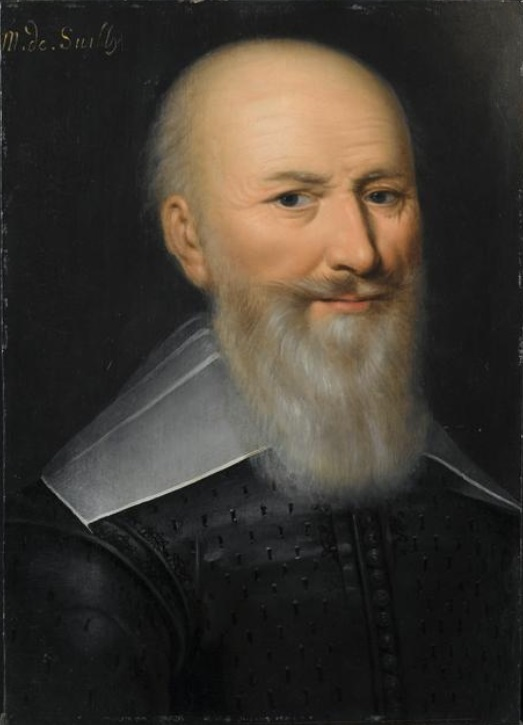
  Maximilien de Béthune
- Patrick Cabanel (1961–), historian.
- Marianne Carbonnier-Burkard (1949–), historian, vice-president of the Society for the History of French Protestantism and a member of the National Ethics Advisory Committee for Life and Health Sciences.
- Bernard Cottret (1951–2020), historian.
- Jean-Henri Merle d'Aubigné (1794–1872), historian and pastor, descendant of Agrippa d'Aubigné. Key work: Discourse on the History of Christianity.
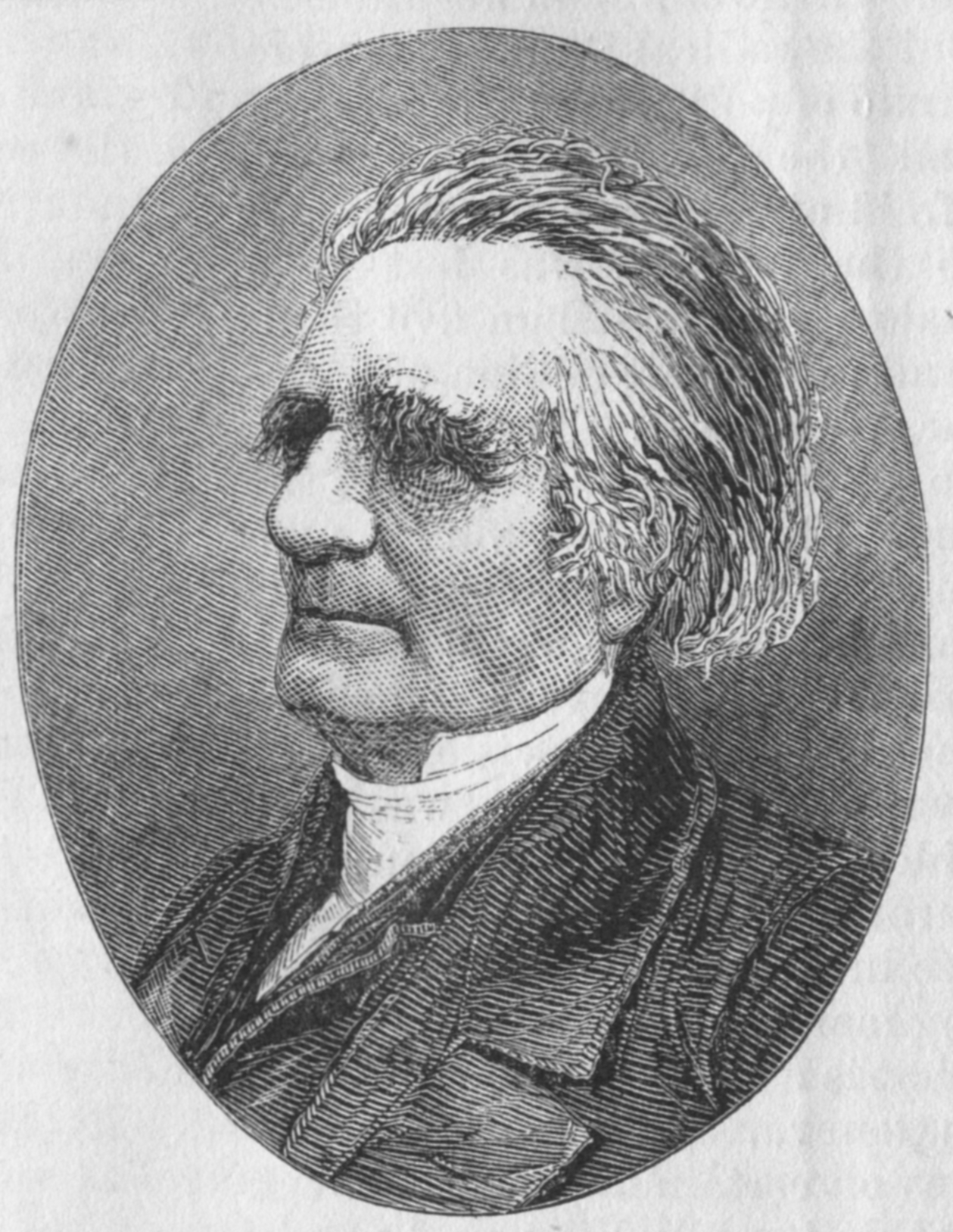
  Jean-Henri Merle d'Aubigné
- François de la Noue (1531–1591), memoirist.
- Lancelot Voisin de La Popelinière (1541–1608), historian.
- Paul de Rapin (1661–1725), historian. Key work: History of England.
- Gédéon Tallemant des Réaux (1619–1690), memoirist.
- Jean de Serres (1540–1598), historian, political advisor and pastor.
- G.E.M. de Ste. Croix (1910–2000), British Marxist historian and atheist, paternal lineage was Huguenot.
- Charlotte Duplessis-Mornay (1550–1606), memoirist, wife of Philippe de Mornay. Key work: Memories of Philippe de Mornay
- Jacques Fontaine, memoirist. Key work: Memoirs of a Huguenot Family.
- François Guizot (1787–1874), French historian, statesman. Key work: History of France.
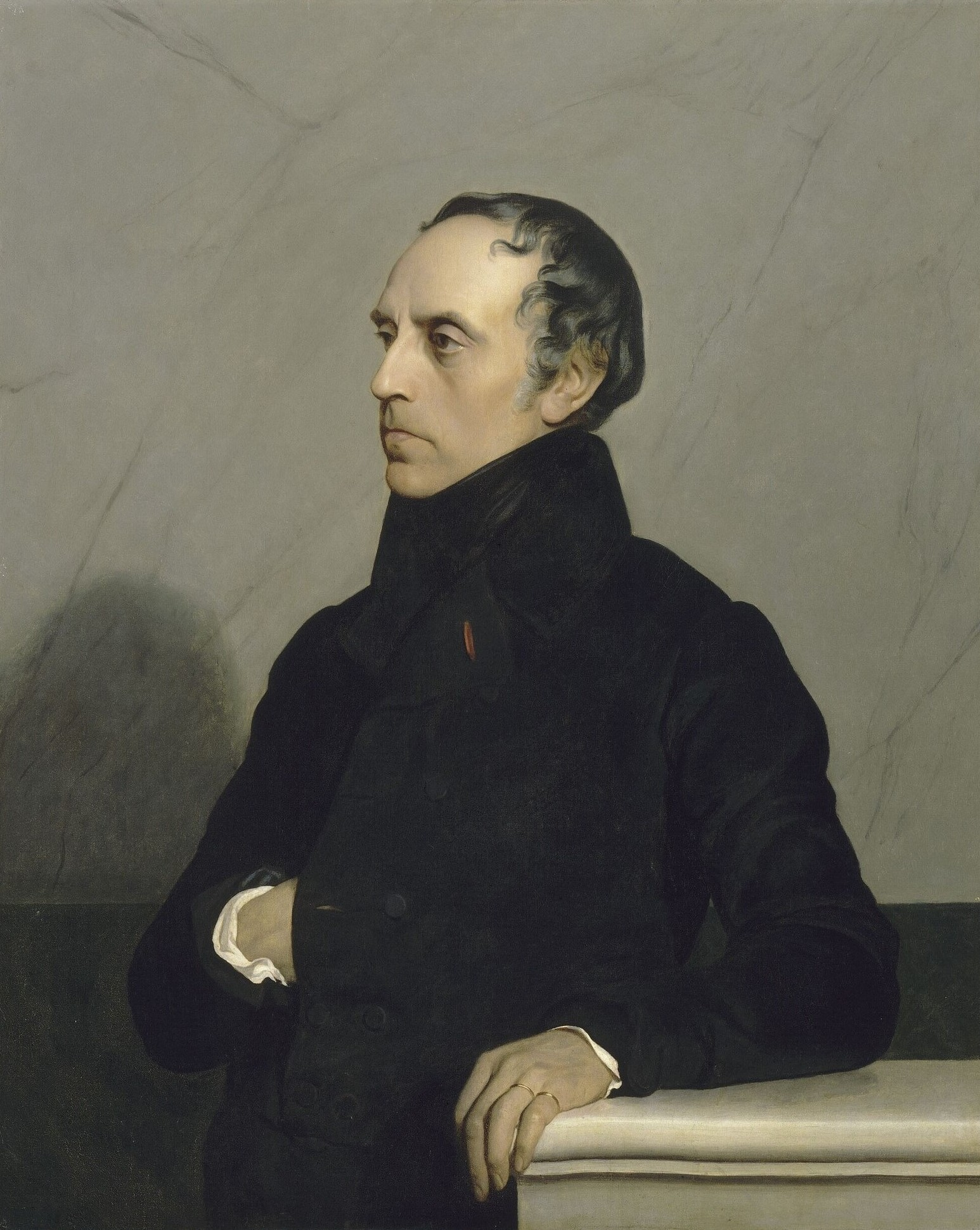
  François Guizot
- Auguste Himly (1823–1906), French historian and geographer.
- Francis Labilliere (1840–1895), Australian historian and imperialist, son of Huguenot-descended Charles Edgar de Labilliere. He was one of the very earliest advocates of Imperial Federation, suggested the foudantion of the Imperial Federation League and later its secretary, member of the council of the Royal Colonial Institute, and the first person to suggest the annexation of Eastern New Guinea.
- Jules Michelet (1798–1874), historian.
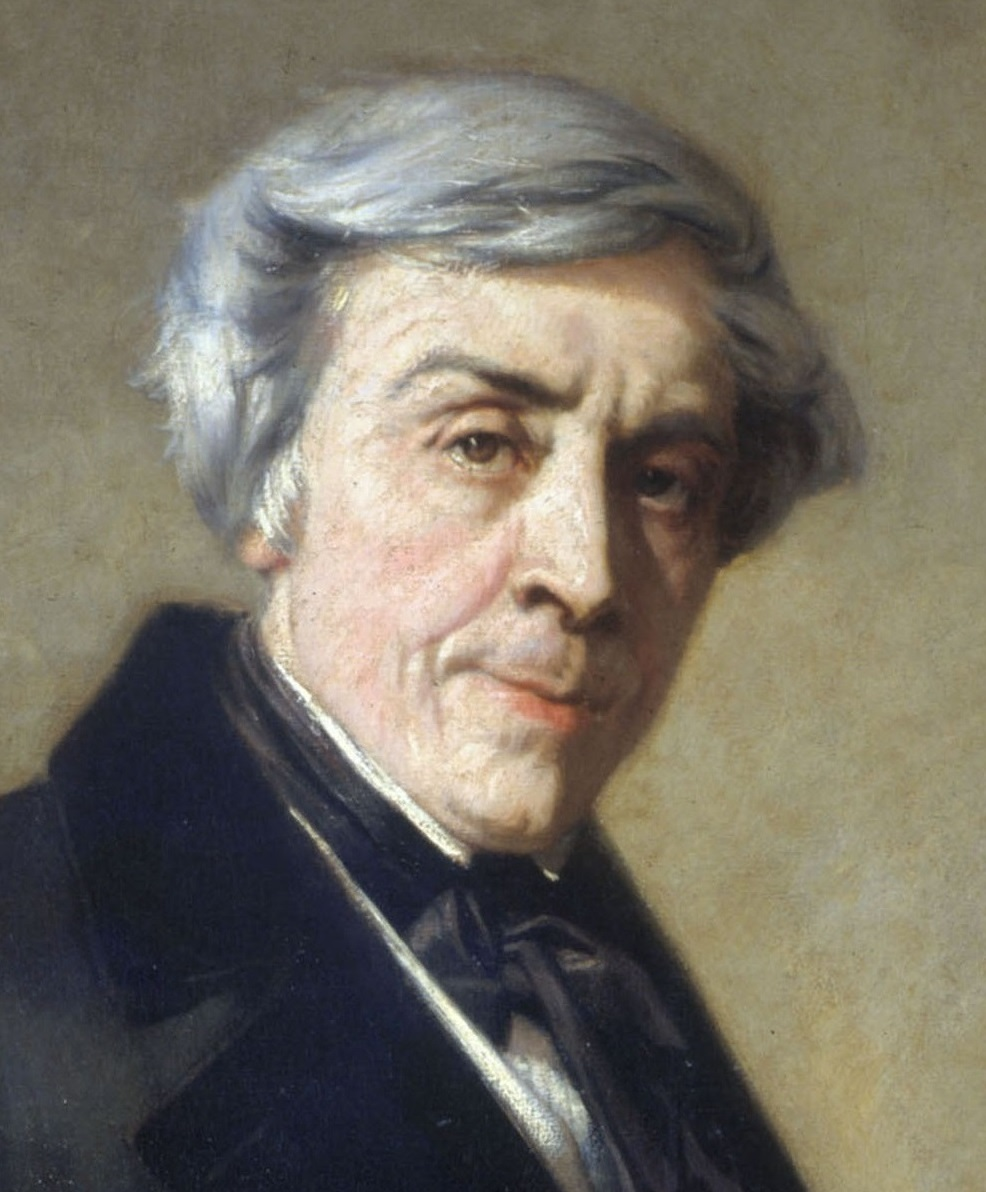
  Jules Michelet
- Gabriel Monod (1844–1912), historian, Dreyfus supporter.
- Napoléon Peyrat (1809–1881), pastor and historian.
- Paul Raison (art historian), long time Chairman of Christie's.
- Charles Read (1819–1898), historian.
- Joseph Justus Scaliger (1540–1609), historian, creationist and chronologer. Key work: Manilius.
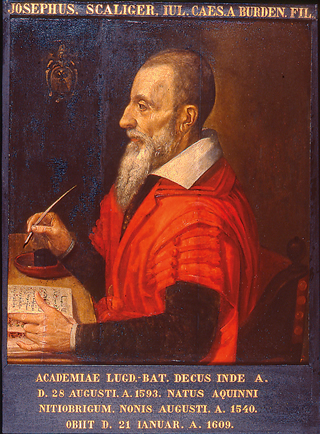
  Joseph Justus Scaliger
- Charles Seignobos (1854–1942), historian.
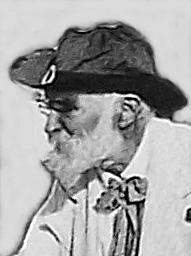
  Charles Seignobos
- Gédéon Tallemant des Réaux (1619–1690), historian. Key work: Historiettes.
- Melesina Trench (1768–1827), Irish diarist, granddaughter of Bishop Richard Chenevix, descended from the Chenevix family of Metz, Lorraine.
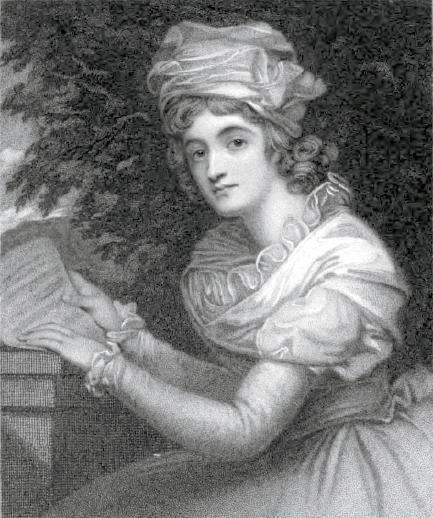
  Melesina Trench

== Jewellers, clockmakers and craftsmen ==
- William Asprey, royal jeweller.
- Philip Audinet (1766–1837), engraver.
- Isaac Basire (1704–1768), engraver.
- Paul Bertrand, craftsman.
- Nicholas Briot (1579–1646), engraver.
- Jean Cavalier, engraver.
- Jean Chardin (later Sir John Chardin) (1643–1713), French jeweller, traveller.
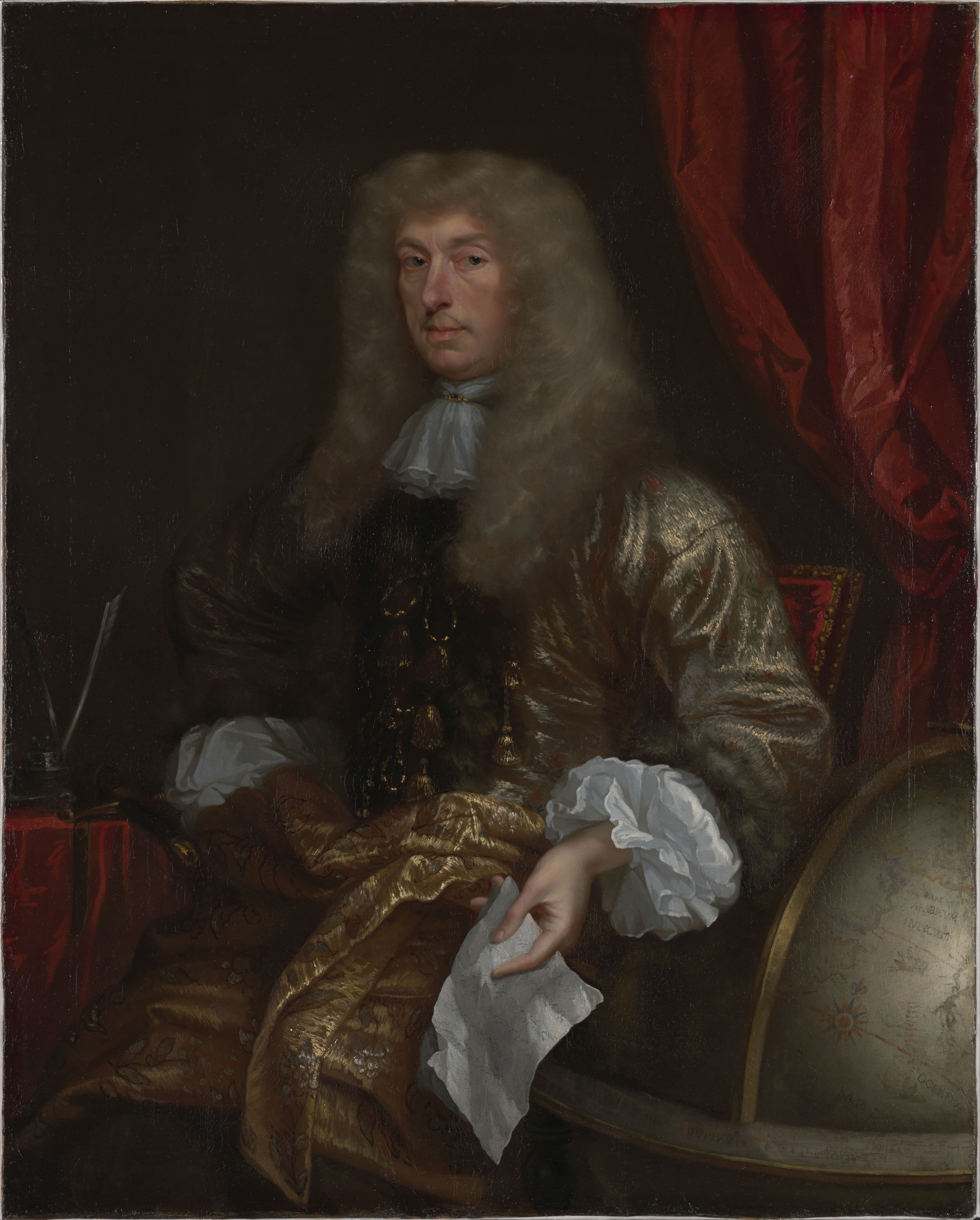
  Jean Chardin
- Jean Baptiste Claude Chatelain (1710–1771), engraver.
- Louisa Courtauld (1729–1807), silversmith.
- Louis Cuny, London goldsmith.
- Paul de Lamerie (1688–1751), London silversmith, the King's Silversmith.
- John Dollond (1706–1761), optical instruments manufacturer, founded business in 1750 that was to become Dollond and Aitchison.
- Gustav Fabergé (1814–1894), Russian jeweller, descended from the Favri family of Picardy.
- Peter Carl Fabergé (1846–1920), Russian jeweller, descended from the Favri family of Picardy.
- Paul Fourdrinier (1698–1758), engraver.
- Charles Gouyn (died 1785), jeweller.
- Simon Gribelin (1661–1733), silver engraver.
- Charles Grignion (1721–1810), clockmaker, son of Daniel Grignion.
- Pierre Harache, goldsmith.
- Jean Francois Hobler (1727–1794), watch and clockmaker.
- Jacques Lamarre, gunsmith.
- John Le Keux (1783–1846), engraver.
- Daniel Myron LeFever (1835–1906), American gunsmith.
- Jean Pelletier, carver and gilder.
- Bernard Picart (1673–1733), engraver.
- Andrew Planche (1727–1805), porcelain maker.
- Jean Pons, London goldsmith.
- Henri de Portal (1690–1747), paper maker.
- Robert Riviere (1808–1882), English bookbinder, uncle of Briton Riviere.
- John Simon (1675–1751), portrait engraver.
- Anne Tanqueray (1691–1733), goldsmith and silversmith, daughter of David Willaume.
- Charles Lewis Tiffany (1812–1902), American jeweller, descended from Jacques Tiphaine, whose family came from Sedan in Champagne.
- Jean Tijou, ironworker.
- James Valoué, watchmaker, inventor of a type of piledriver, freemason.

== Journalists ==
- Reginald Bosanquet (1932–1984), English newsreader.
- Abel Boyer (1667–1729), journalist.
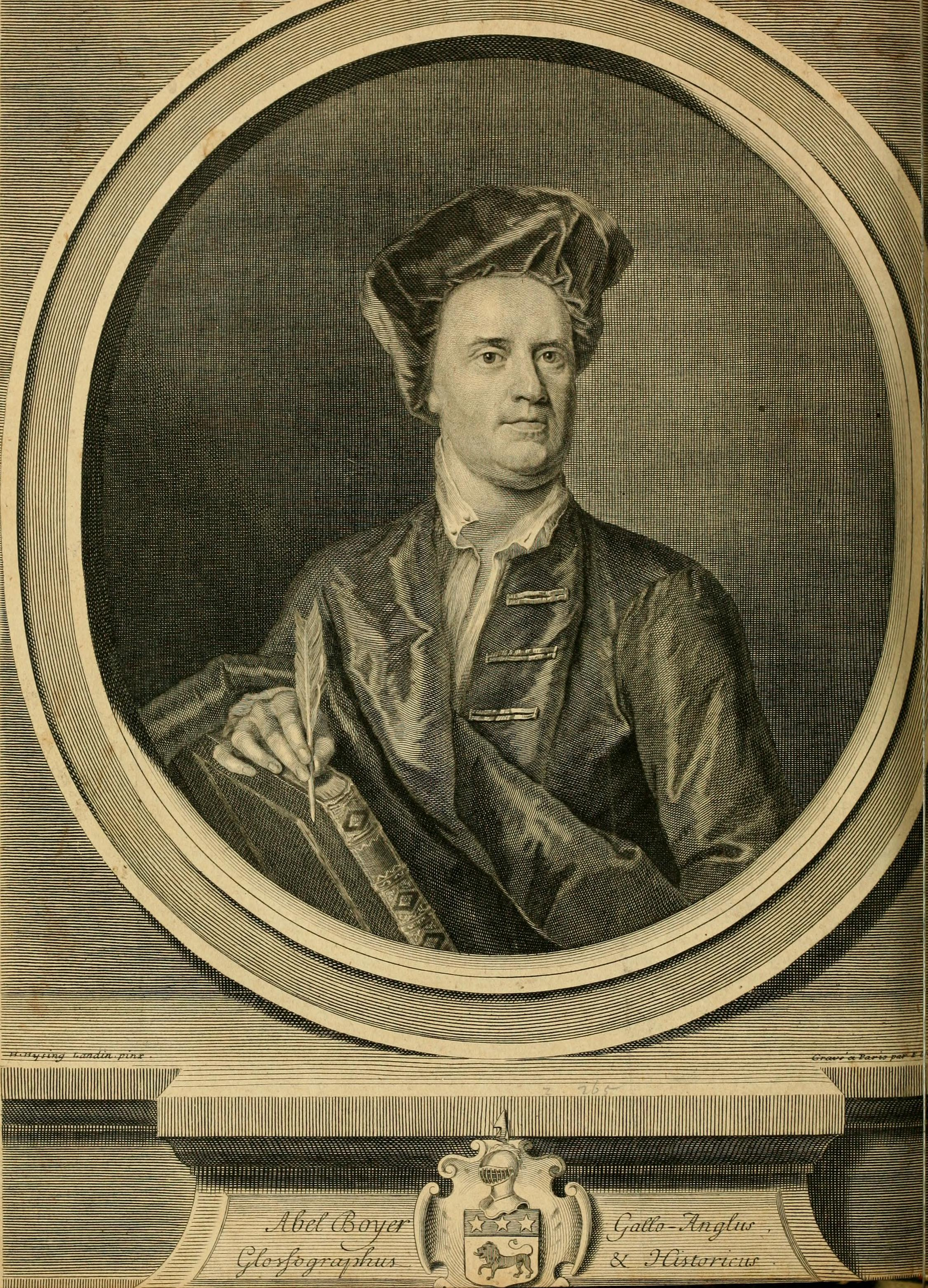
  Abel Boyer
- Tom Brokaw (born 1940), American television journalist, author.
- Frank Deford (1938–2017), American sports journalist.
- Charles De Boos, Australian journalist.
- Michael de la Roche (1710–1742), journalist and translator, advocate of religious toleration, member of the Rainbow Coffee House Group.
- Max du Preez, South African journalist and author.
- Raymond Durgnat (1932–2002), English film critic, opponent of structuralism and its associated far-left politics, advocate of frequently-derided film-maker Michael Powell, opponent of left wing intellectuals, supporter of working-class culture, descended from French Huguenot refugees who fled to Switzerland.
- Sean Else, South African writer, filmmaker
- Orla Guerin (1966–), Irish war correspondent.
- Gideon Joubert (1923–2010), South African science journalist and Intelligent Design proponent.
- Rian Malan (1954–), South African journalist and memoirist, descended from Jacques Malan of Provence and South African Prime Minister, Daniel Malan. Key work: My Traitor's Heart.
- Matthieu Maty (1718–1776), journalist, founded Journal Brittanique which helped to familiarize French readers with English literature, member of the Royal Society, under-librarian of the British Museum, from Dauphiné.
- Pierre Motteux (1718–1776), journalist, founder of Gentleman's Journal, from Rouen.
- Max Raison, publisher and managing editor of Picture Post, and co-founder of New Scientist.
- Théophraste Renaudot (1584–1653), considered the first French journalist, founder of the Gazette de France.
- Giles Romilly (1916–1967), British journalist, Nazi POW, nephew of Winston Churchill.
- John Merry Sage (1837–1926), British journalist
- Louise Weiss (1893–1983), French journalist and politician, international affairs expert and pacifist. She was the daughter of an Alsatian Protestant mining engineer and philanthropist, Paul Louis Weiss (1867–1945), and a Jewish mother.
- Peregrine Worsthorne (1923–2020), British journalist.

== Lawyers ==
- Charles Ancillon (1659–1715), French jurist, diplomat.
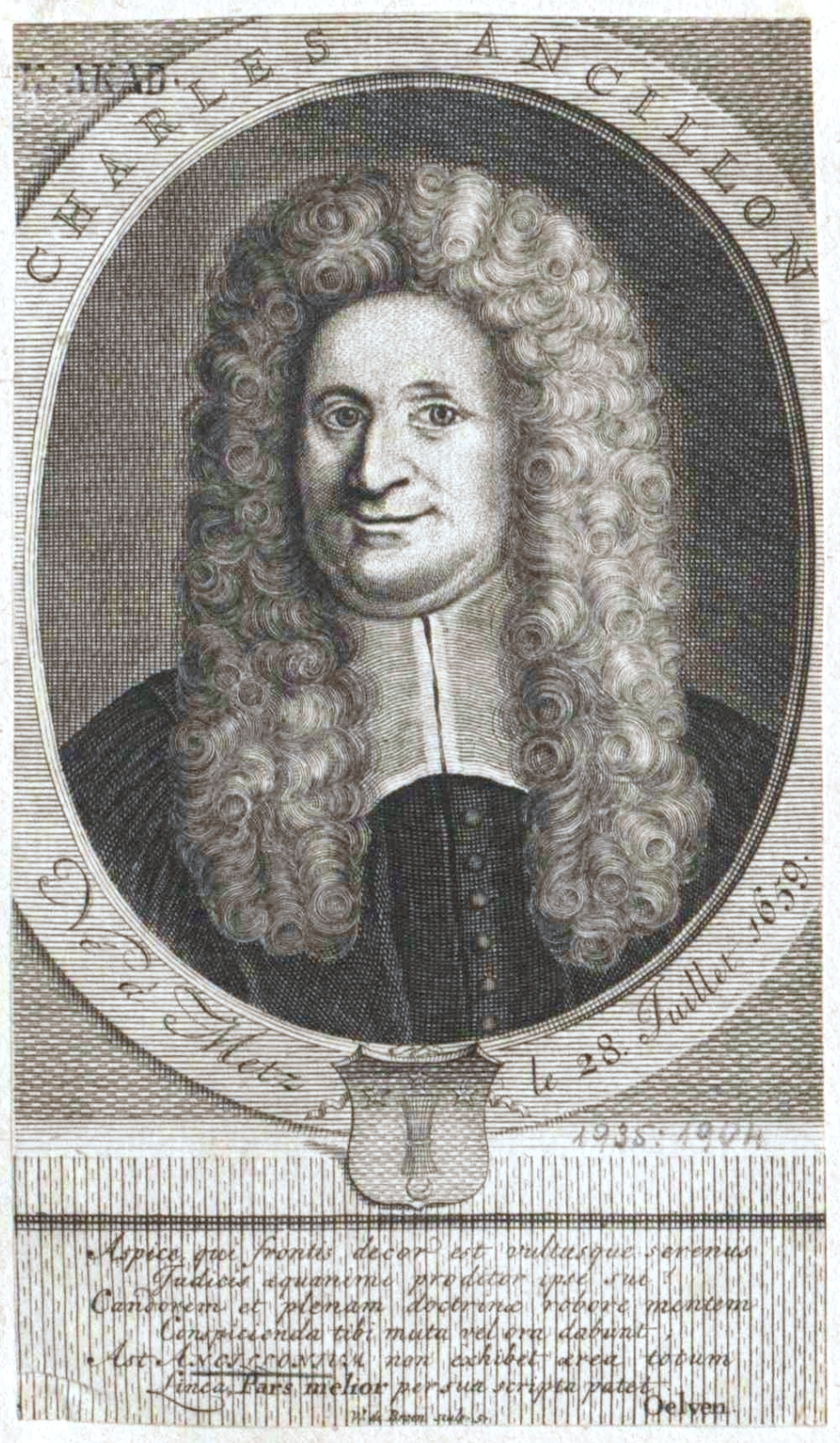
  Charles Ancillon
- Emile Arnaud, lawyer, coined the term, "pacifism", president de la Ligue internationale de la Paix et de la Liberté fondée. Key work: L'Organisation de la paix.
- John Bosanquet (1773–1847), English judge.
- Samuel Bosanquet (1768 –1843), Justice of the Peace, Sheriff of Monmouth.
- Samuel Richard Bosanquet (1800–1882), English barrister and writer on legal, social and theological subjects. (Key work: The First Seal: Short Homilies on the Gospel According to St. Matthew.)
- Jean Carbonnier (1908–2003), jurist, father of Marianne Carbonnier-Burkard, converted from Roman Catholicism to Protestantism.
- Warder Cresson (1798–1860), American writer, first US consul to Jerusalem, convert from Quakerism to Judaism, had Huguenot ancestors.
- John de Villiers, 1st Baron de Villiers (1842–1914), Chief Justice of the Cape of Good Hope.
- Anne Dubourg, lawyer, parliamentarian, first member of the nobility to be martyred.
- John Jay (1745–1829), first Chief Justice of the US Supreme Court, descendant of Mary Van Cortlandt and Pierre Jay, a merchant from Poitou.
- Charles Layard (1849–1915), English chief justice of Ceylon.
- Peter Manigault (1731–1773), attorney, plantation owner and slave owner, wealthiest man in North America at the time of his death, descended from the Manigault family of La Rochelle.
- André Philip (1902–1970), lawyer, Christian socialist.
- Frederic Ouvry (1814–1881) lawyer for Charles Dickens, antiquary.
- John Romilly (1802–1874), English judge.
- Anton Friedrich Justus Thibaut (1772–1840), German jurist.
- John Silvester (1745–1822), lawyer, son of Sir John Baptist Silvester (doctor at the French Hospital).
- Robert Percy Smith(1770–1845), British lawyer, Member of Parliament, and Judge Advocate-General of Bengal, India, brother of Sydney Smith, descended from the Olier family.
- William Teulon Swan Stallybrass (1883–1948), British Barrister, Principal of Brasenose College, Oxford and Vice-Chancellor of the University of Oxford.
- Friedrich Carl von Savigny (1779–1861), German jurist.
- Alfred Wills (1828–1912), British justice.

== Librarians ==
- Élie Bouhéreau (1643–1719), Dublin librarian, from La Rochelle.
- Andrew Ducarel (1713–1785), librarian, antiquarian.
- Anton Philipp Reclam (1807–1896), German librarian, publisher and founder of the Universalbibliothek.
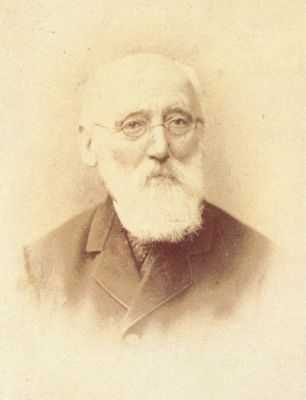
  Anton Philipp Reclam

== Linguists, lexicographers and semioticians ==
- Roland Barthes (1915–1980), literary theorist and semiotician, Marxist atheist from a Protestant family.
- Ferdinand de Saussure (1857–1913), linguist and semiotician, whose mother was from a wealthy Protestant banking family, and whose father's family consisted of a long line of Huguenot academics who had fled to Geneva to escape persecution.
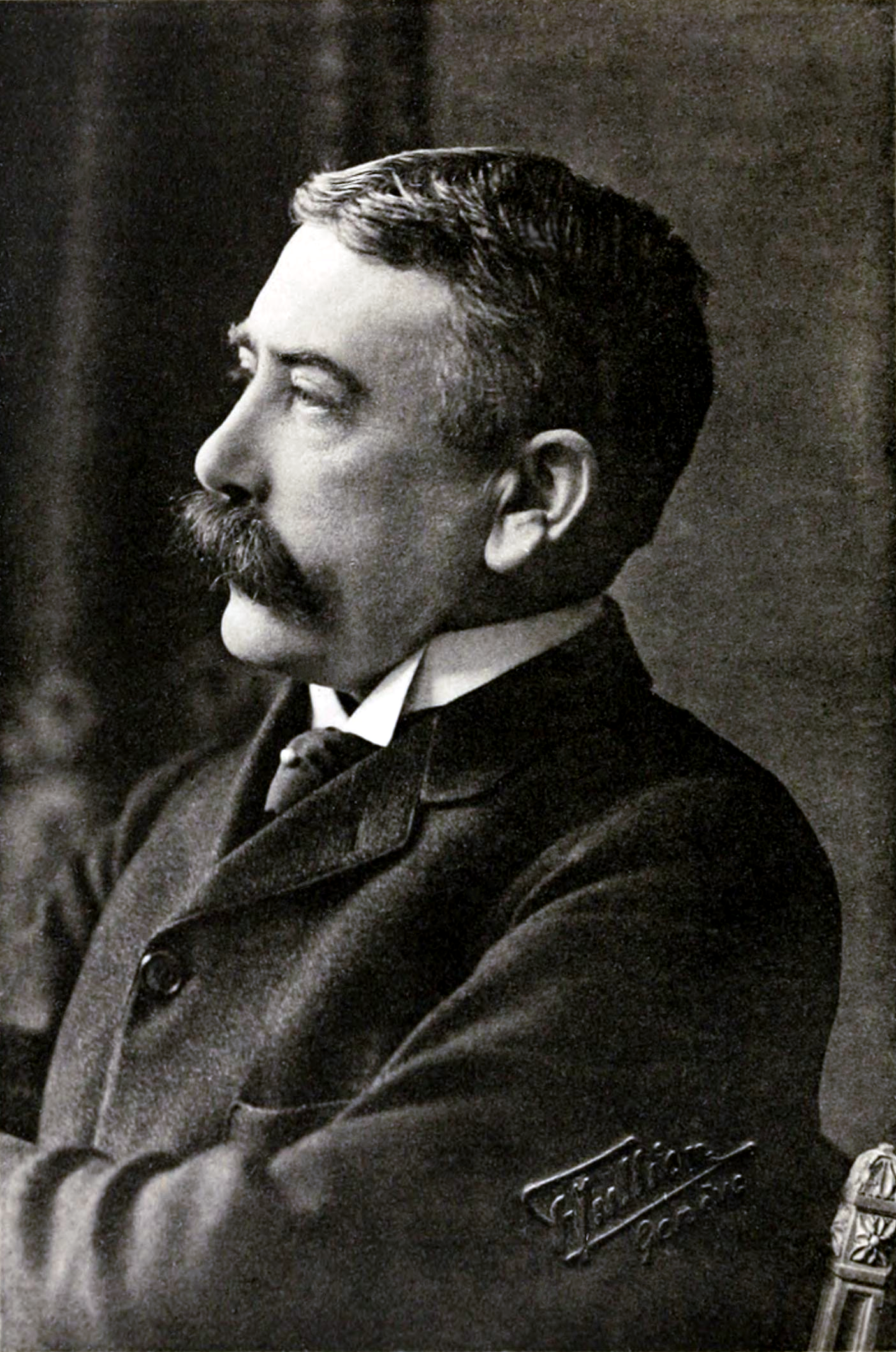
  Ferdinand de Saussure
- Michael Maittaire (1668–1747), linguist.
- Paul Passy (1859–1940), linguist, Social Christianity advocate, lived according to 'primitive Christian' ideals, son of the Nobel Peace Prize laureate, Frédéric Passy.
- Peter Mark Roget (1779–1869), lexicographer, creator of Roget's Thesaurus, physician.

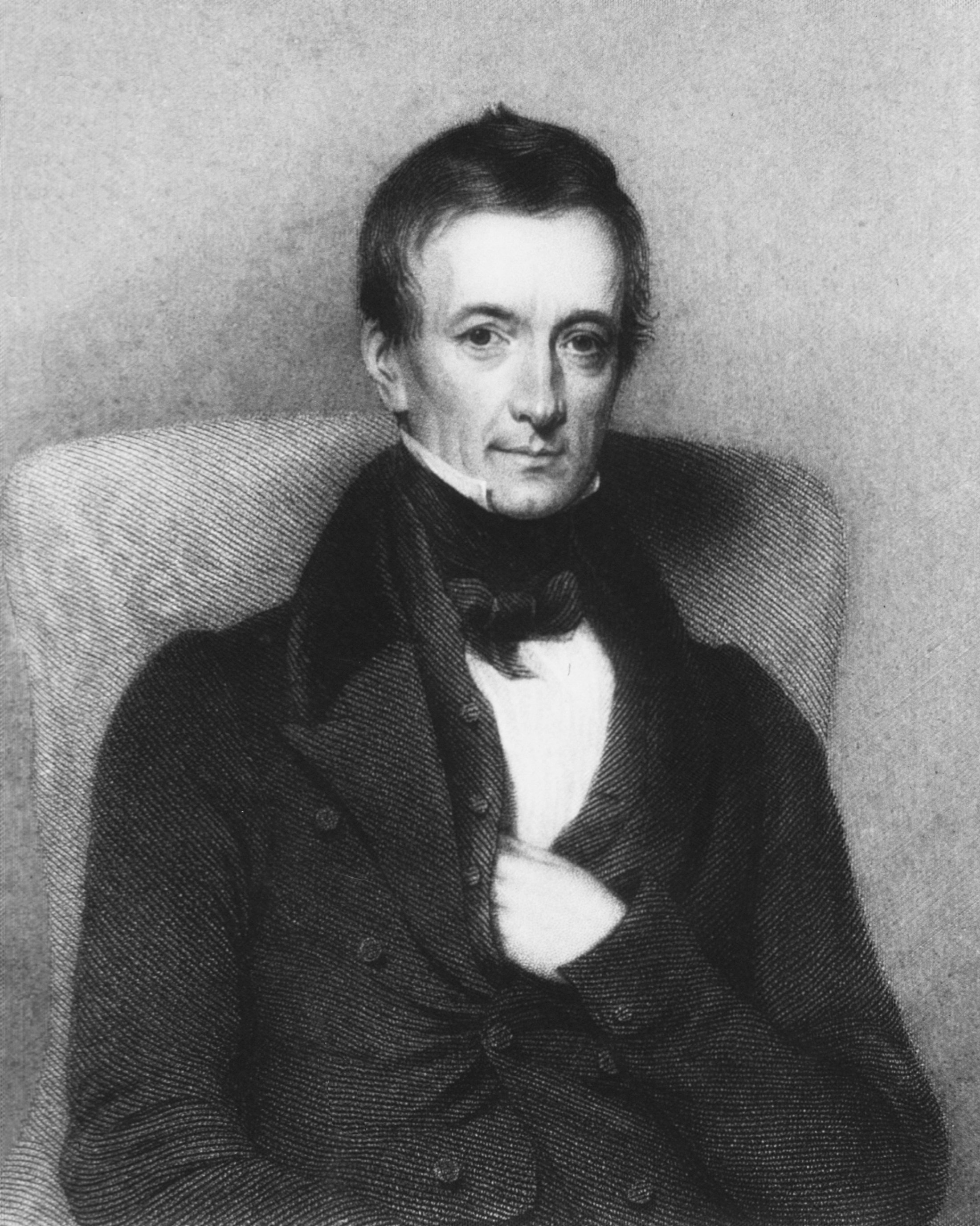
Peter Mark Roget

- Wilhelm von Humboldt (1767–1835), German linguist.
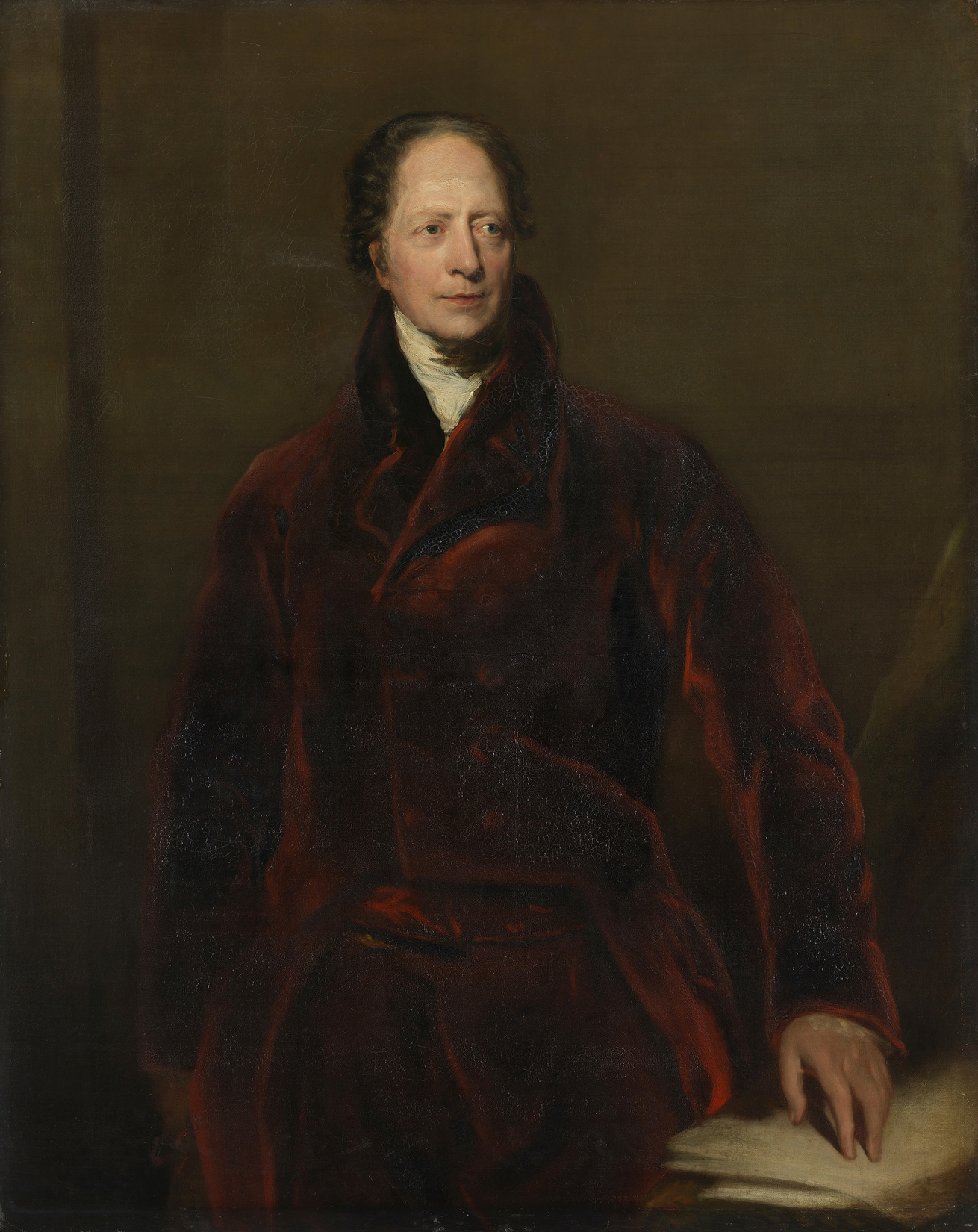
  Wilhelm von Humboldt

== Martyrs and victims of persecution ==
- Claude Brousson (1647–1698), martyr, pastor and pacifist.
- Jean Calas (1698–1762), martyr.

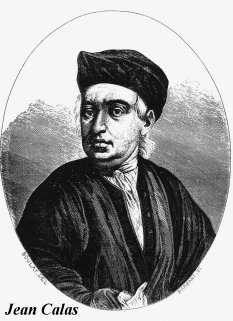
Jean Calas

- Guido de Brès (died 1567), pastor, martyr of Valenciennes, incarcerated in sewage for six weeks before being executed.
- Gaspard II de Coligny (1519–1572), martyr (Saint Bartholomew's Day massacre), Huguenot leader.
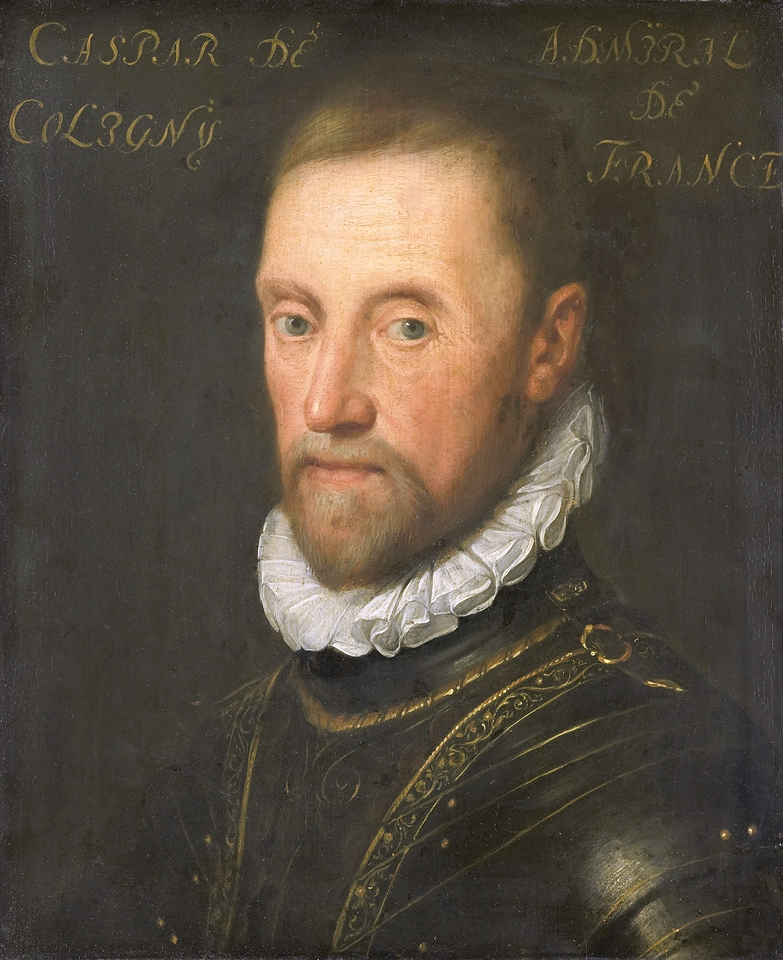
  Gaspard II de Coligny
- Jean de Ferrières, Vidame de Chartres (1520–1586), French nobleman, martyr who died in prison galley.
- Pierre de la Place (died 1572), duke, martyr (Saint Bartholomew's Day massacre).
- François III de La Rochefoucauld (died 1572), nobleman, martyr (Saint Bartholomew's Day massacre).
- Charles de Quellenec (1548–1572), baron of Pont-l'Abbé, first husband of Catherine de Parthenay, martyr (Saint Bartholomew's Day massacre).
- Charles de Téligny (1535–1572), French diplomat, martyr (Saint Bartholomew's Day massacre), first husband of Louise de Coligny.
- Jean du Barry, seigneur de la Renaudie (died 1560), organizer of the Amboise conspiracy
- Anne du Bourg (1530–1559), martyr, magistrate, counsellor of France.
- Marie Durand (1711–1776), from Bouchet du Pransles in Vivarais, prisoner of conscience (Tower of Constance). Key work: Lettres de Marie Durand (1711–1776): Prisonnière à la Tour de Constance de 1730 à 1768.
- Pierre Durand (1700–1732) martyr, pastor.
- Jean Goujon (1510–1572), sculptor, martyr (Saint Bartholomew's Day massacre).
- Jean Marteilhe (1684–1777), from Bergerac, prisoner of conscience (galley slave) and memoirist. Key work: The Huguenot Galley-Slave: Being the Autobiography of a French Protestant Condemned to the Galleys for the Sake of His Religion.
- Gabriel Maturin, left crippled by twenty-six years' confinement in the Bastille, ancestor of clergyman and author, Charles Maturin.
- Petrus Ramus (1515–1572), martyr (Saint Bartholomew's Day massacre), philosopher.
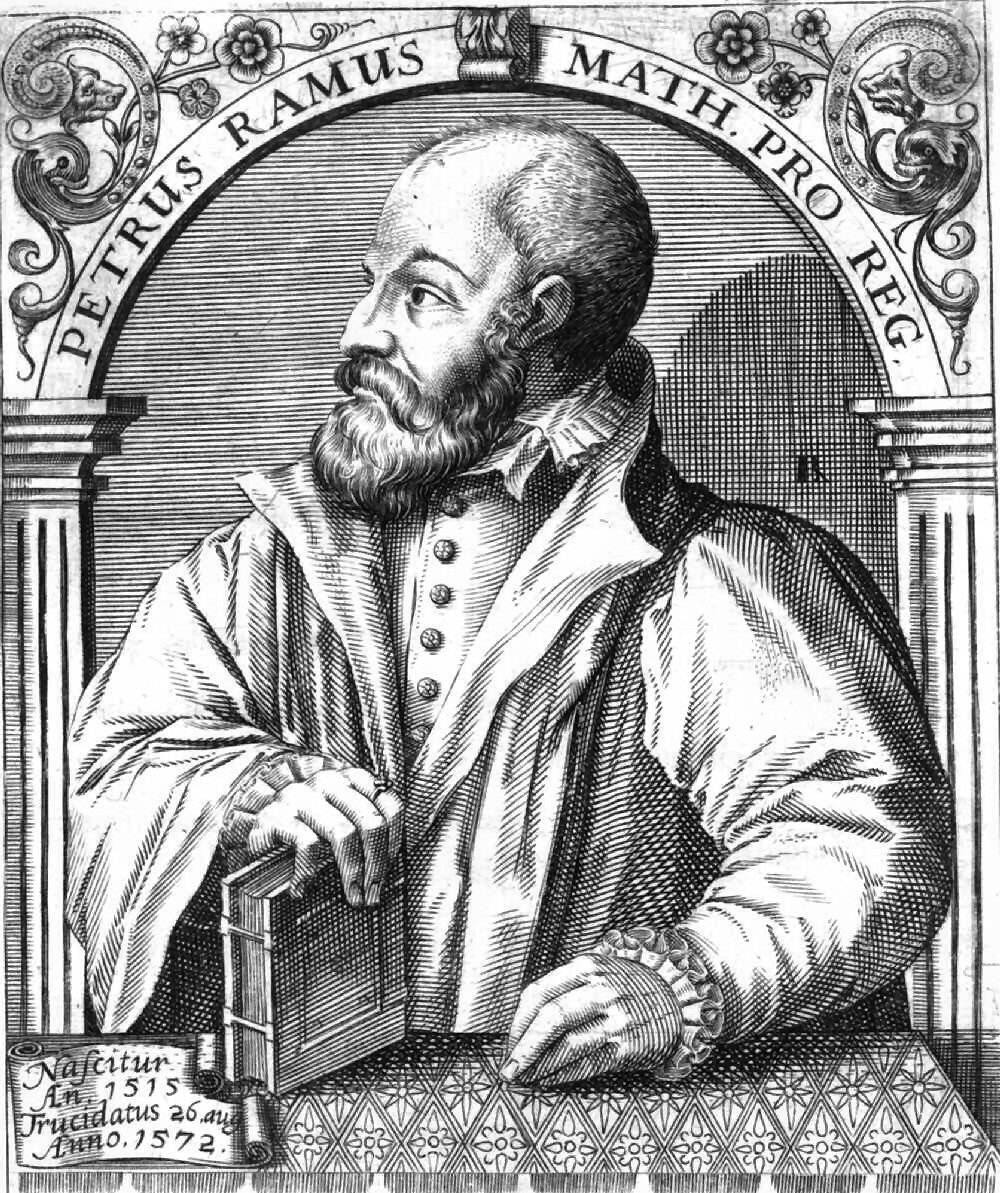
  Petrus Ramus
- Jean Ribault (1520–1565), early colonizer of America, he and other Huguenot colonists were massacred by the Spanish for their faith.
- Pierre-Paul Sirven (1709–1777), victim of persecution.

== Military ==
- John André (1751–1780), head of British intelligence operations in America during the Revolutionary War, associate of Benedict Arnold, hanged for spying.
- Francis Beaufort (1774–1857), hydrographer of the British Admiralty.
- Salomon Blosset de Loche (1648–1721), French general.
- John Blossett, British soldier, led British expedition to aid Simon Bolivar in the wars of independence against Spain
- Marquis Calmes, general, veteran of the American Revolution and the War of 1812.
- Jan Celliers (1861–1931), Anglo-Boer War general
- Joshua Lawrence Chamberlain, Union general in the US Civil War, governor of the state of Maine.
- Harry Chauvel (1865–1945), Australian military commander, liberator of Jerusalem (the Battle of Beersheba).
- Frederick Cockayne Elton, Crimean War recipient of the Victoria Cross
- Buffalo Bill Cody (1846–1917), American soldier, hunter and showman.
- Piet Cronje, leader of the Transvaal Republic's military forces during the First and Second Anglo-Boer Wars.
- Henri d'Aramitz, musketeer descended from a Huguenot family and the inspiration behind Aramis in Dumas' The Three Musketeers.
- François de Beauvais, Seigneur de Briquemault, French soldier
- Henri I de Bourbon, prince de Condé (1552–1588), French general, son of Louis de Condé.
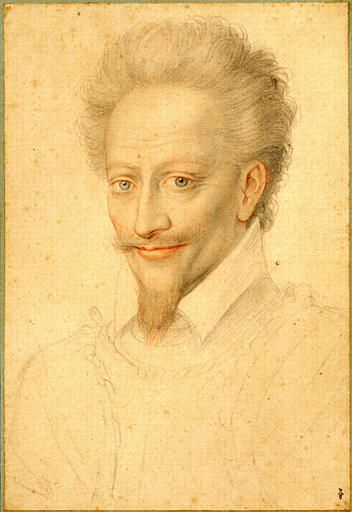
  Henri I de Bourbon, prince de Condé
- Louis I de Bourbon, prince de Condé (1530–1569), French general, brother-in-law of Jeanne d'Albret (Queen of Navarre).
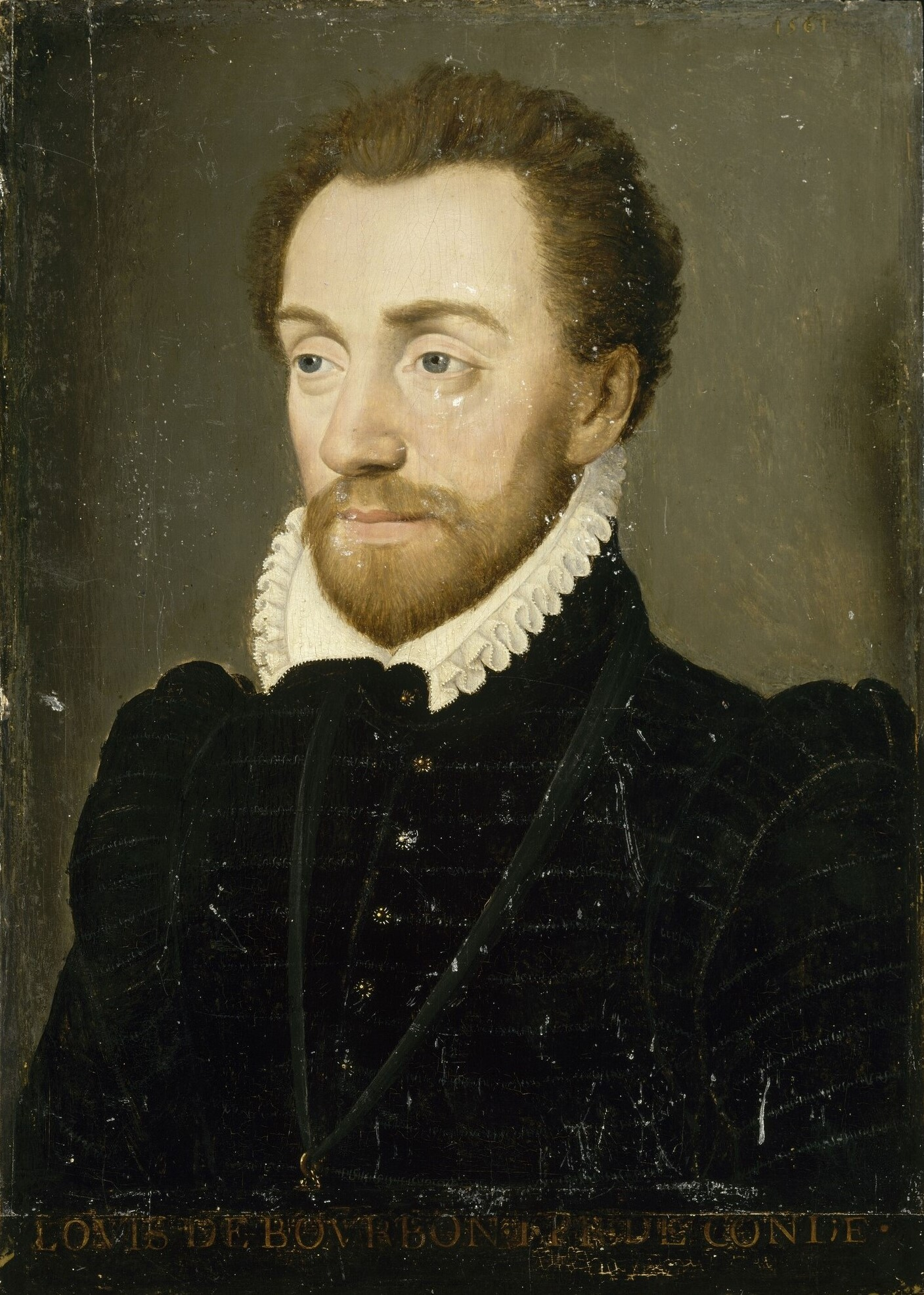
  Louis I de Bourbon, prince de Condé
- Alfred Gardyne de Chastelain, British Army lieutenant colonel, member of the Special Operations Executive
- John de Chastelain, Canadian diplomat, general and chief of Defence Staff of the Canadian Forces
- Hector Francois Chataigner de Cramahé, French soldier, assisted William of Orange in the taking of the British throne
- Peter de la Billière, British military commander
- Heinrich August de la Motte Fouqué (1698–1774), Prussian soldier, grandfather of Prussian novelist, Friedrich de la Motte Fouqué.
- François de la Noue (1531–1591), French soldier, called Bras-de-Fer (Iron Arm).
- François de La Rochefoucauld, Marquis de Montandre (1672–1739), Huguenot refugee and British soldier.
- Henri de La Tour d'Auvergne, Duke of Bouillon (1555–1623), French general, Prince of Sedan, Marshal of France.
- Henri de La Tour d'Auvergne, Viscount of Turenne (1611–1675), French general, Marshal General of France, son of Henri de La Tour d'Auvergne, Duke of Bouillon.
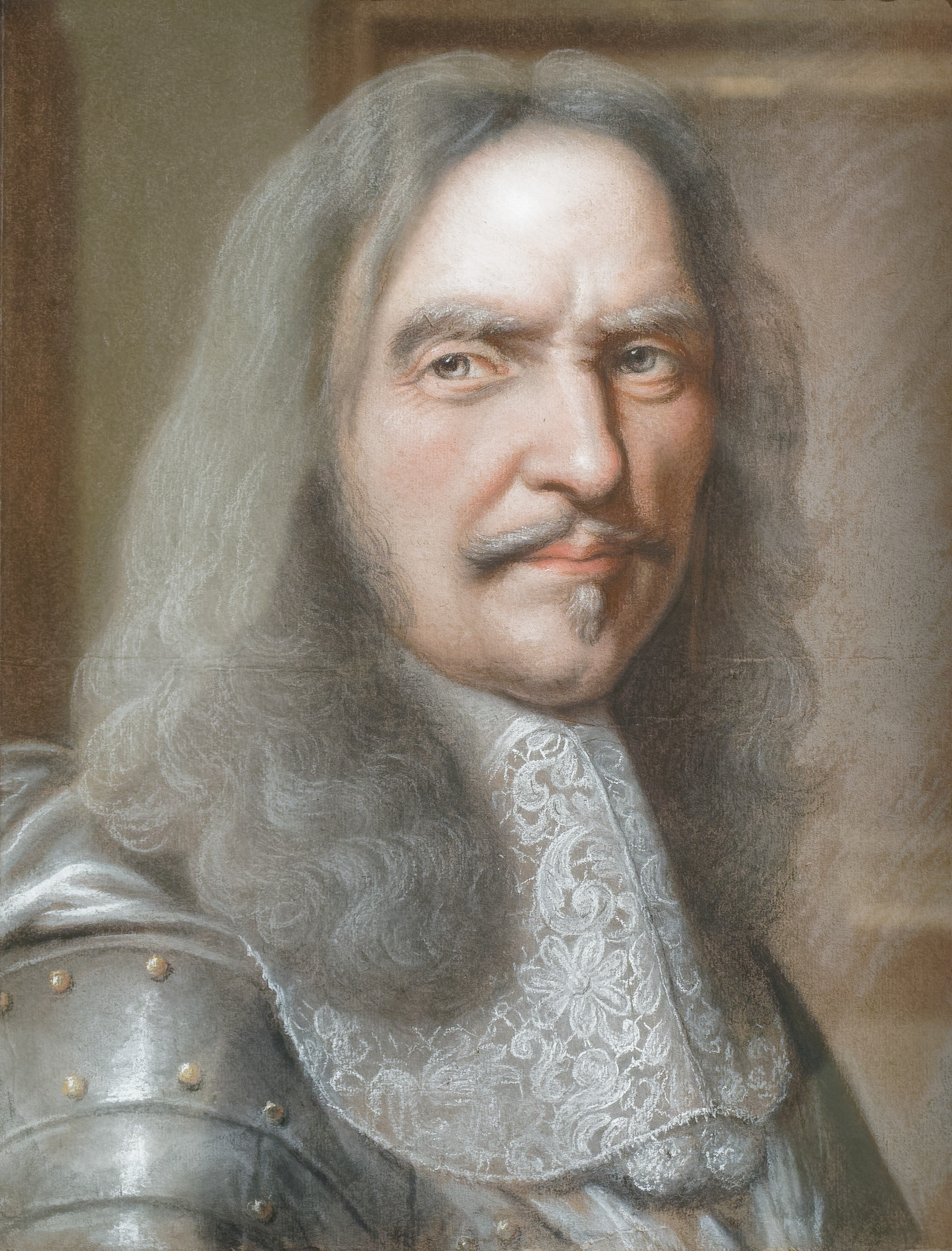
  Henri de La Tour d'Auvergne, Viscount of Turenne
- Henri Charles de La Trémoille, 4th Duke of Thouars (1620–1672), French military commander, periodically switched between Roman Catholcisim and Calvinism.
- Ulrich de Maizière (1912–2006), German general, descended from a noble family of French Huguenot origin, originally from Maizières-lès-Metz in Lorraine.
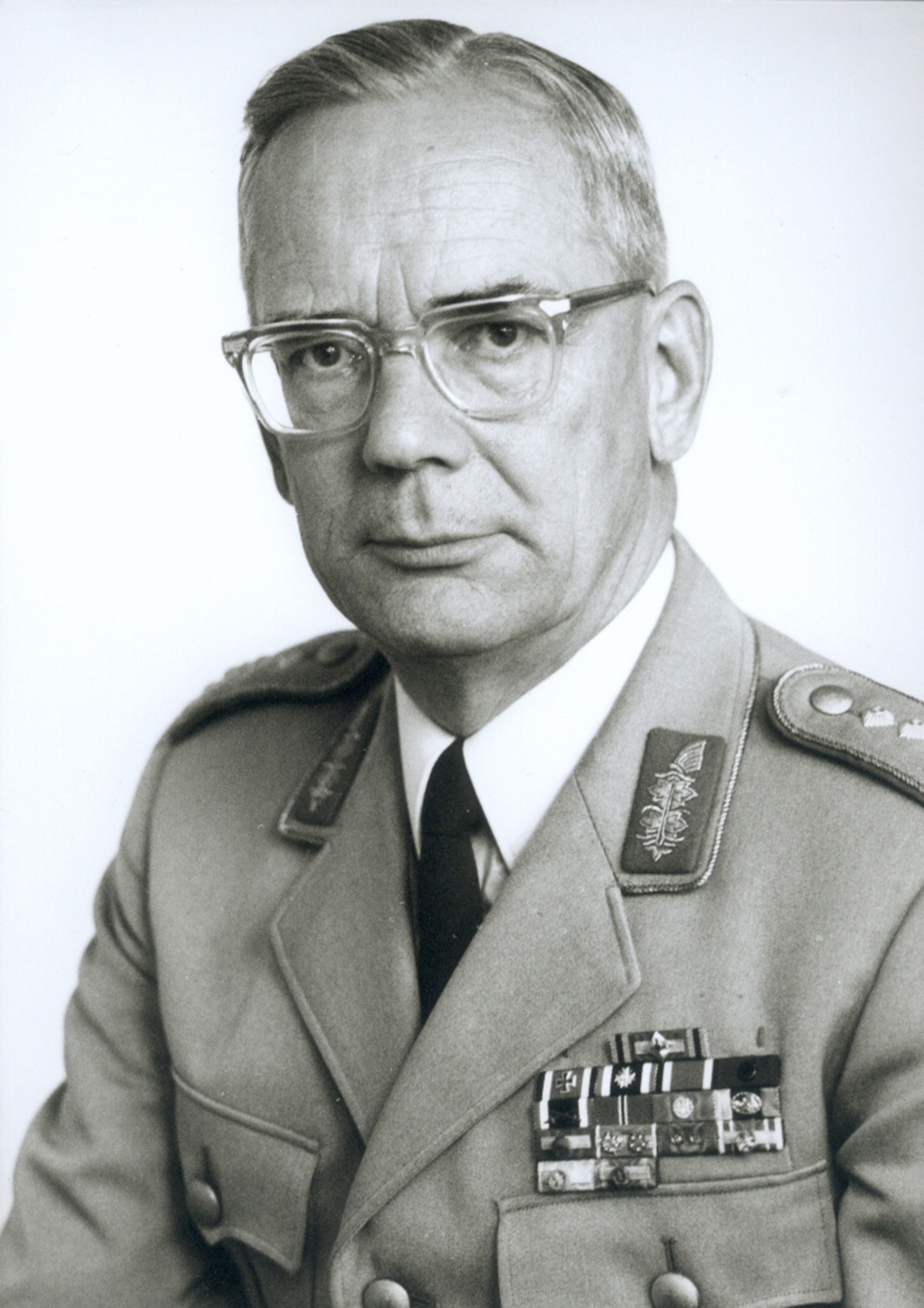
  Ulrich de Maizière
- Henri de Massue, Earl of Galway (1648–1720), soldier.
- John Watts de Peyster, American Brevet Major General in the American Civil War
- Jean de Poltrot (1537–1563), shot the Duke of Guise in arguably history's earliest firearm assassination.
- Henri, duc de Rohan (1579–1638), French soldier, son of Catherine de Parthenay.
- Christiaan du Toit, South African military commander.
- Charles FitzRoy, British Army officer
- Henry Gage, 3rd Viscount Gage, major general in the British Army
- Adolf Galland, German Luftwaffe general, World War II fighter ace
- Paul de Gually (died 1737), French Huguenot soldier who became major-general in the British Army
- Henri Guisan, Commander-in-Chief of the Swiss Army during World War II
- Michel Hollard, French Resistance figure who told British Intelligence about the V-1.
- Peter Horry, American Revolutionary War general
- Benjamin Huger, American Civil War general (Confederate)
- Petrus Jacobus Joubert, Boer commandant-general of the South African Republic from 1880 to 1900.
- Pierre Laporte (nicknamed Rolland) (1680–1704), Camisard leader.
- Jean L'Archevêque, French explorer, soldier, merchant-trader
- John Laurens, American Revolutionary War hero
- Curtis LeMay (1906–1990), American Air Force General and Air Force Chief of Staff
- Anton Wilhelm von L'Estocq, Prussian general
- John Ligonier, 1st Earl Ligonier (1680–1770), Commander-in-Chief of the British Army, fought against the French in the Seven Years' War, governor of the French Hospital from 1748 to 1770. The son of Louis de Ligonier of Castres, he escaped to Dublin as a child during the Revocation of the Edict of Nantes.
- Adolph Malan, South African World War II fighter pilot ace.
- Magnus Malan, former South African Minister of Defence, Chief of the South African Defence Force, Chief of the South
- Arthur Middleton Manigault, American Civil War general (Confederate)
- Francis Marion, American Revolutionary War guerrilla fighter, whose life may have formed the basis for Mel Gibson's film, The Patriot.
- Hans-Joachim Marseille (1919–1942), German Luftwaffe ace, penitent for the killings he committed.
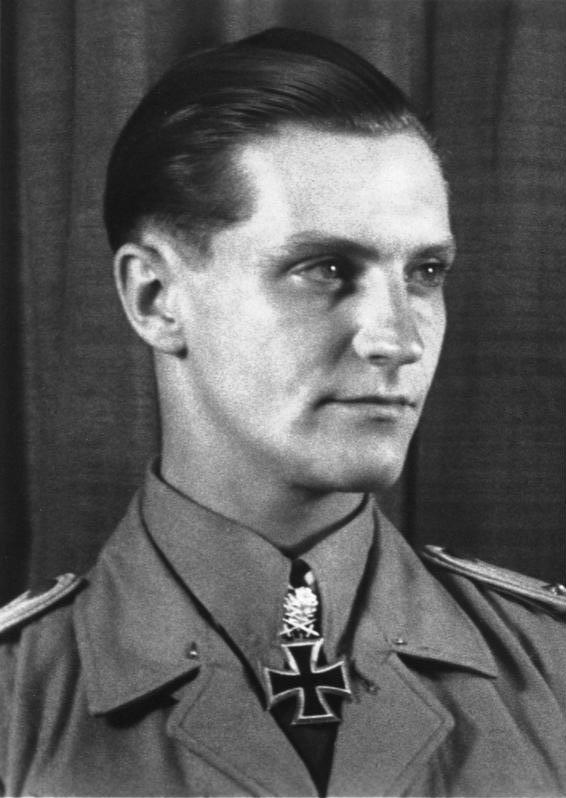
  Hans-Joachim Marseille
- Paul Mascarene (1684–1760), French-born British army officer.
- Peter Mawney, colonel, Rhode Island militia
- Abraham Mazel (1677–1710), Camisard leader.
- Charles Manigault Morris, American Navy officer (Confederate)
- Lewis Nicola, American Revolutionary War General (Union)
- George S. Patton, Jr., US WWII Army general
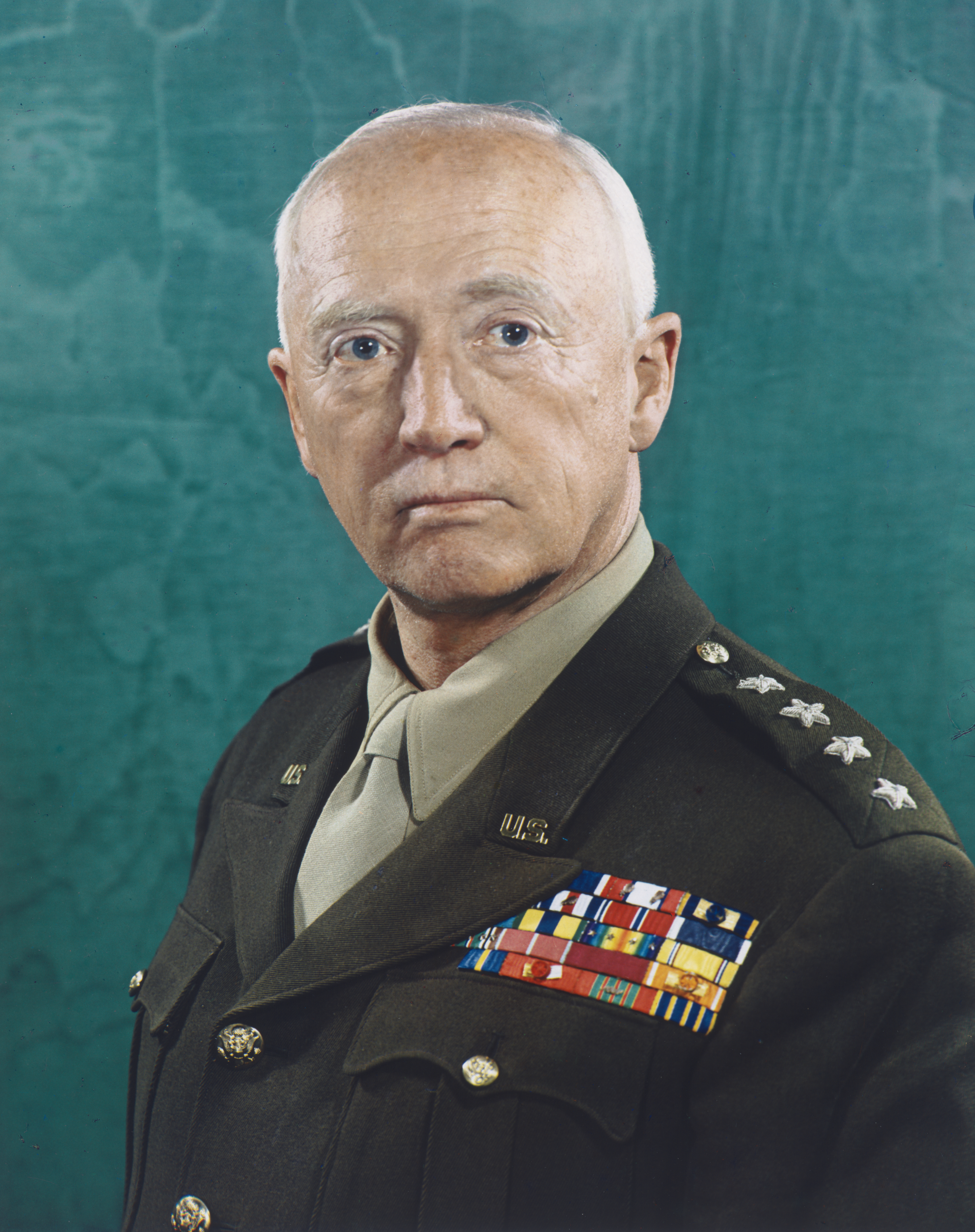
  George S. Patton
- Paul Pechell (1724 - 1800), Irish military commander, grandson of Samuel De Péchels.
- J. Johnston Pettigrew, American Civil War general (Confederate)
- George Pickett, American Civil War general (Confederate)
- Charles Portal, British Chief of the Air Staff 1940–1945 Combined Chiefs of Staff 1942–1945
- Paul Revere (1735–1818), American silversmith, famous for "Paul Revere's Ride" at the outbreak of the American War of Independence, descended from the Rivoire family from Riocaud, in the Gironde valley, near Bordeaux.
- Frederick Roberts, 1st Earl Roberts (1832–1914), Indian-born Anglo-Irish leader of the East India Company Army from an old Waterford family, of Huguenot origin.
- Barry St. Leger, British officer
- Henri Salmide (real name Heinz Stahlschmidt) (1919–2010), German military officer who became hero by refusing to obey orders to destroy Bordeaux.
- Frederick Schomberg, 1st Duke of Schomberg (1615–1690), commander of King William III's army, Battle of the Boyne.
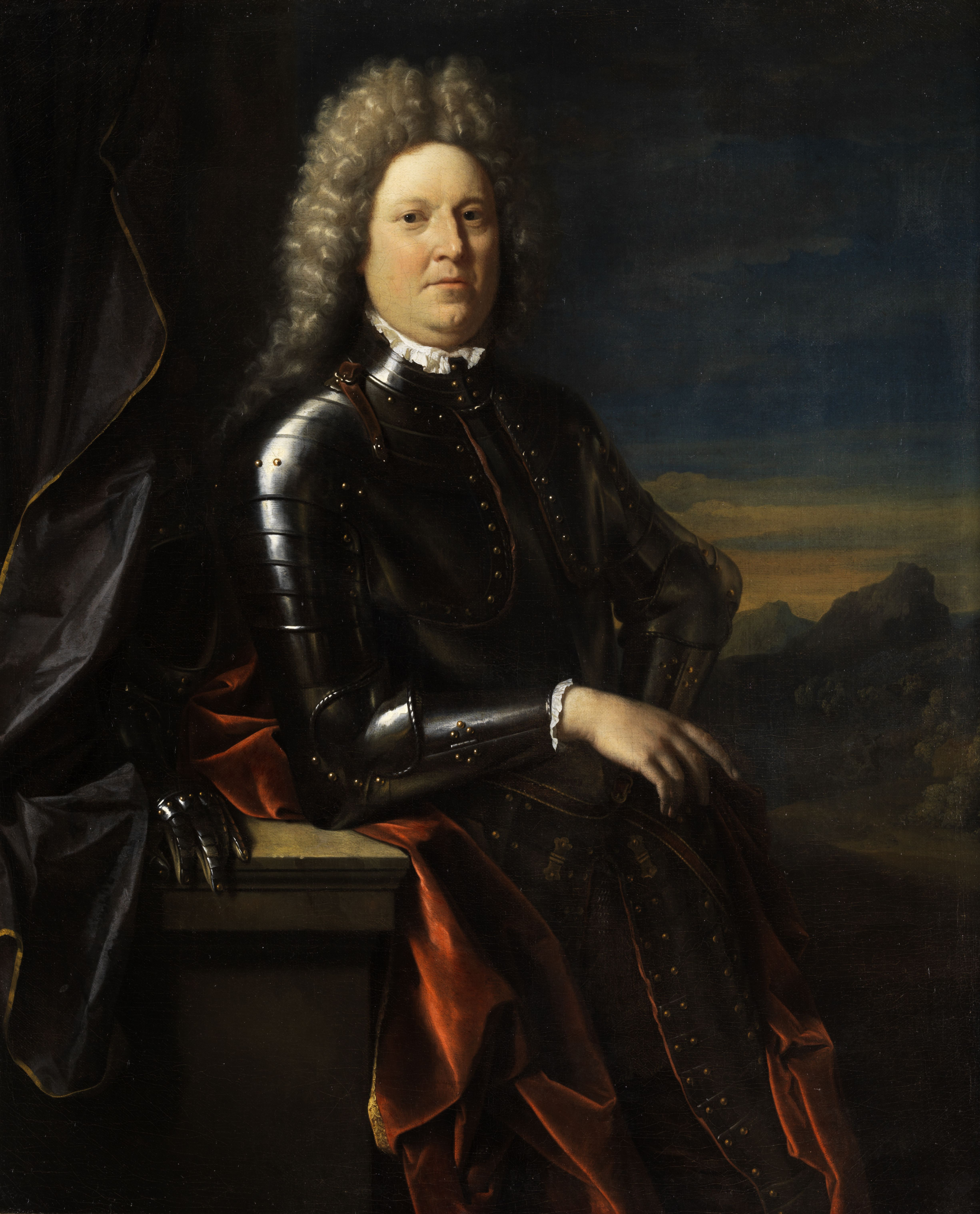
  Frederick Schomberg, 1st Duke of Schomberg
- Alan Shepard (1923–1998), astronaut, first American in space, descendant of Philippe de La Noye.
- Charles C. Tew, colonel Confederate States Army
- Ernst Udet (1896–1941), German First World War Ace, Luftwaffe Colonel-General in World War Two, committed suicide.
- John Vereker, 6th Viscount Gort, Chief of the Imperial General Staff of the British Army, commander of the British Expeditionary Force (World War II), descendant of the North American Delancey family
- Constand Viljoen (1933–2020), leader of the South African Freedom Front, SADF general.
- John Bordenave Villepigue (1830–1862), American Civil War general (Confederate)
- John C. Villepigue (1896–1943), Medal of Honor winner
- Lothar von Arnauld de la Perière (1886–1941), highest scoring German U-boat commander of World War I
- Curt von François (1852–1931), German soldier, geographer and administrator in German South-West Africa (now Namibia).
- Hermann von François (1856–1933), German World War I general, victor of the Battle of Tannenberg.
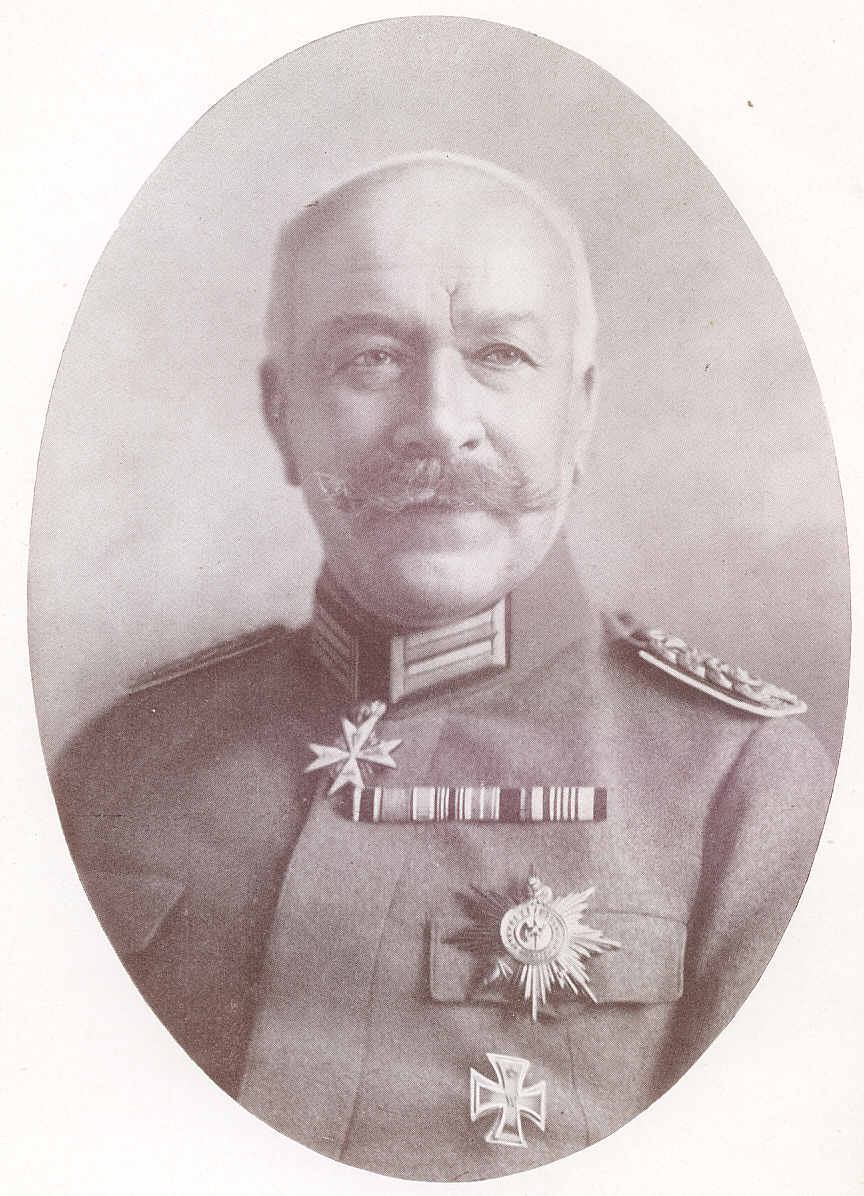
  Hermann von François
- Wilhelm Anton Souchon (1864–1946), German admiral in World War I. Souchon commanded the Kaiserliche Marine's Mediterranean squadron in the early days of the war.
- Jacobus Herculaas de la Rey (1847–1914), better known as Koos de la Rey, was a South African military officer who served as a Boer general during the Second Boer War.

== Missionaries ==
- Élie Allégret (1865–1940), French pastor and missionary in Africa and pacifist.
- Thomas Barclay (1849–1935), Scottish missionary.
- François Coillard (1834–1904), missionary in Africa for the Paris Evangelical Missionary Society.
- François Daumas, missionary in Orange Free State, member of the Paris Evangelical Missionary Society.
- Maurice Leenhardt (1878–1954), missionary, pastor and ethnologist specialising in the Kanak people of New Caledonia.
- Robert Whitaker McAll (1821–1893), Scottish founder of the Popular Evangelical Mission of France, for the Parisian working class and which is still currently in existence.
- Pierre Stouppe (1690–1760), Huguenot pastor then low church/evangelical Anglican minister, missionary to African-American slaves.

== Pastors and theologians ==
- Firmin Abauzit (1679–1767), theologian, philosopher, editor, librarian.
- Jacques Abbadie (1654–1727), French theologian. Key work: Vindication of the Truth.
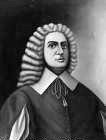
  Jacques Abbadie
- Pierre Allix (1641–1717), pastor. Key work: Some Remarks Upon the Ecclesiastical History of the Ancient Churches of Piedmont.
- Moses Amyraut (1596–1664), French theologian, proponent of Amyraldism.
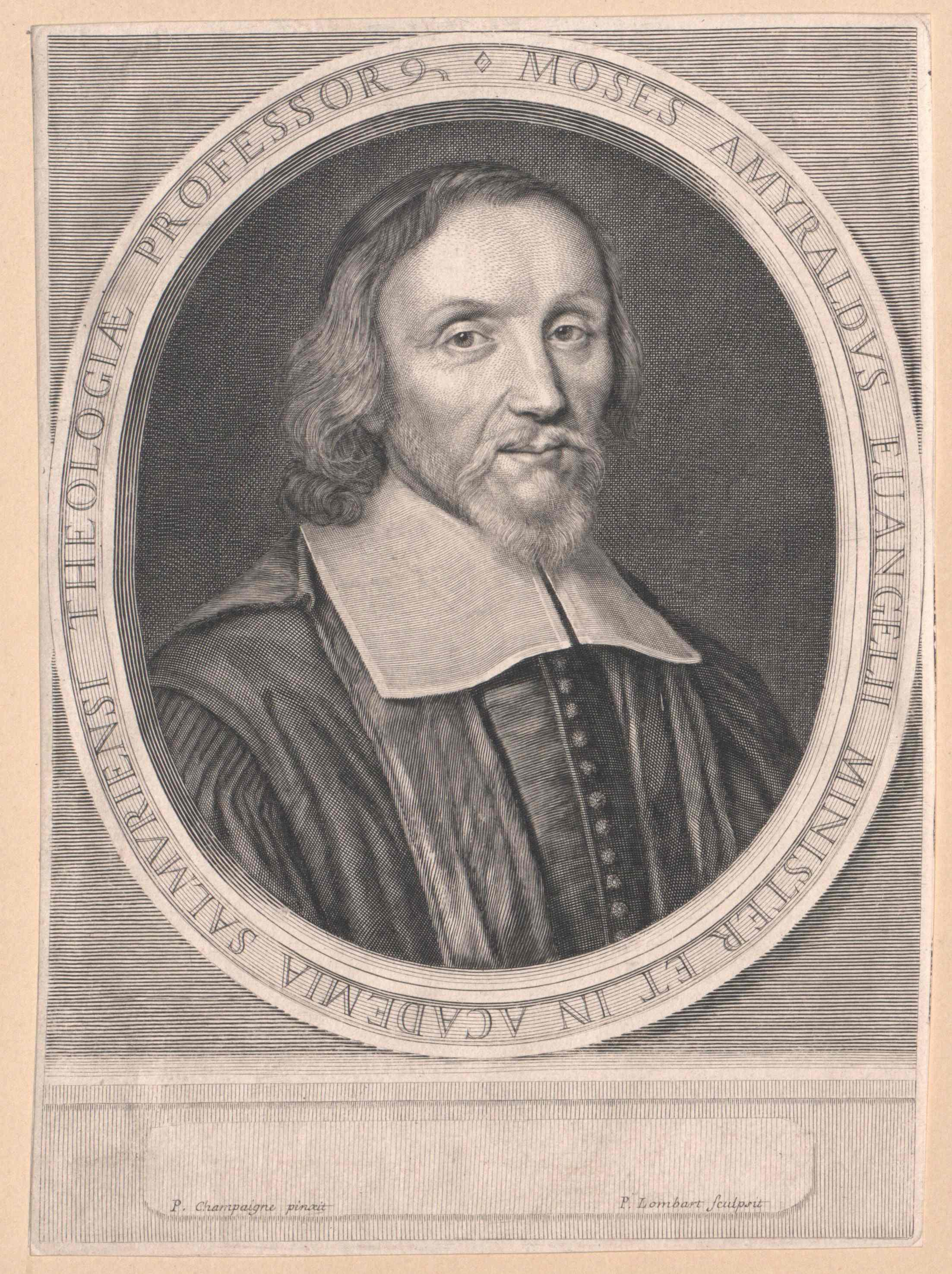
  Moses Amyraut
- Madeleine Barot (1909–1995), theologian and pacifist, co-founder of the Cimade.
- Henry Bidleman Bascom, US Congressional chaplain, Methodist bishop
- Jacques Basnage (1653–1723), theologian. Key work: Instructions pastorales aux Réformés de France sur l'obéissance due aux souverains.
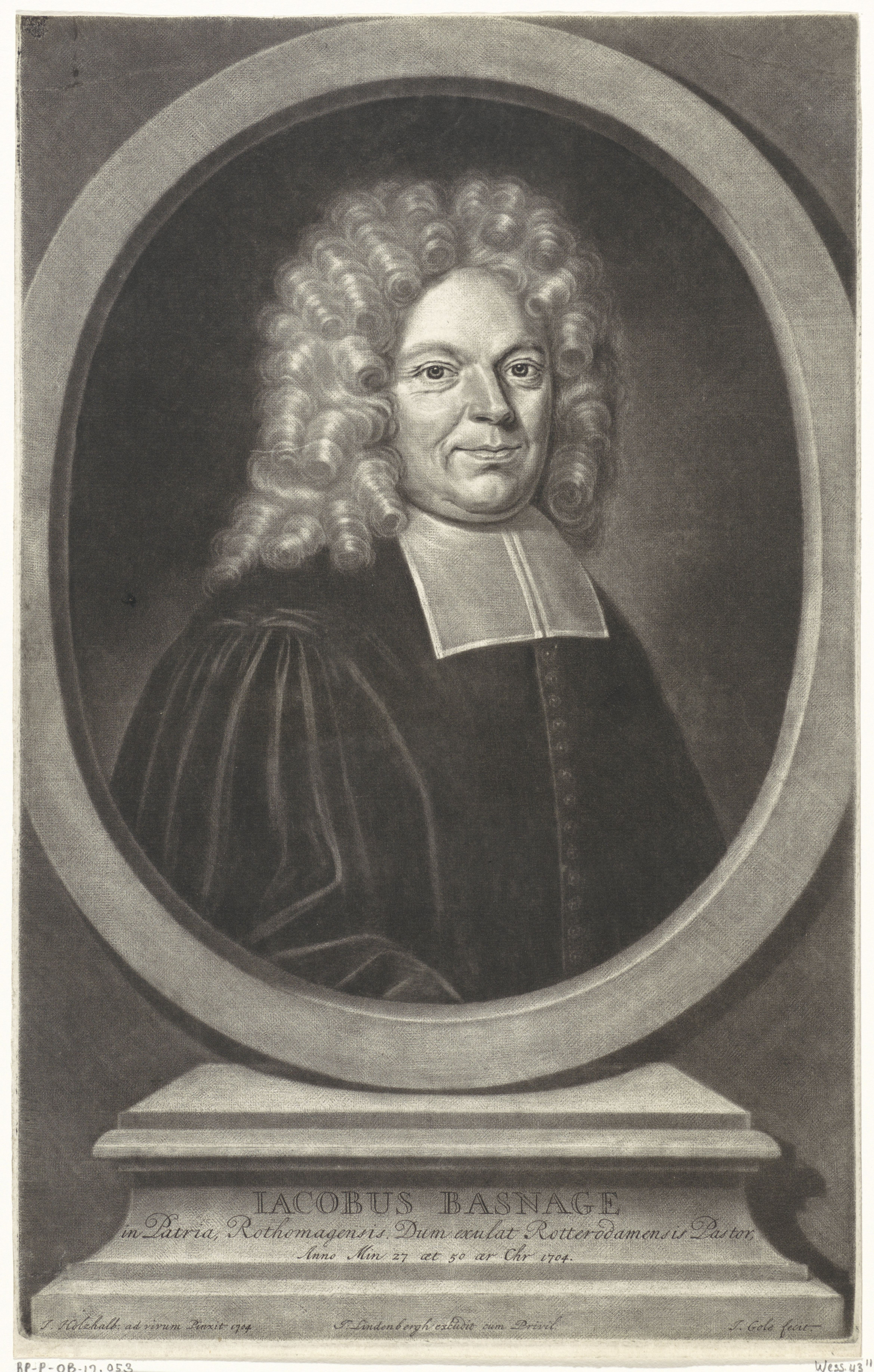
  Jacques Basnage
- Jacques Bernard (1658–1718), theologian.
- Charles Bertheau (1660–1732), pastor.
- Theodore Beza, French theologian. Key work: Treasure of Gospel Truth.
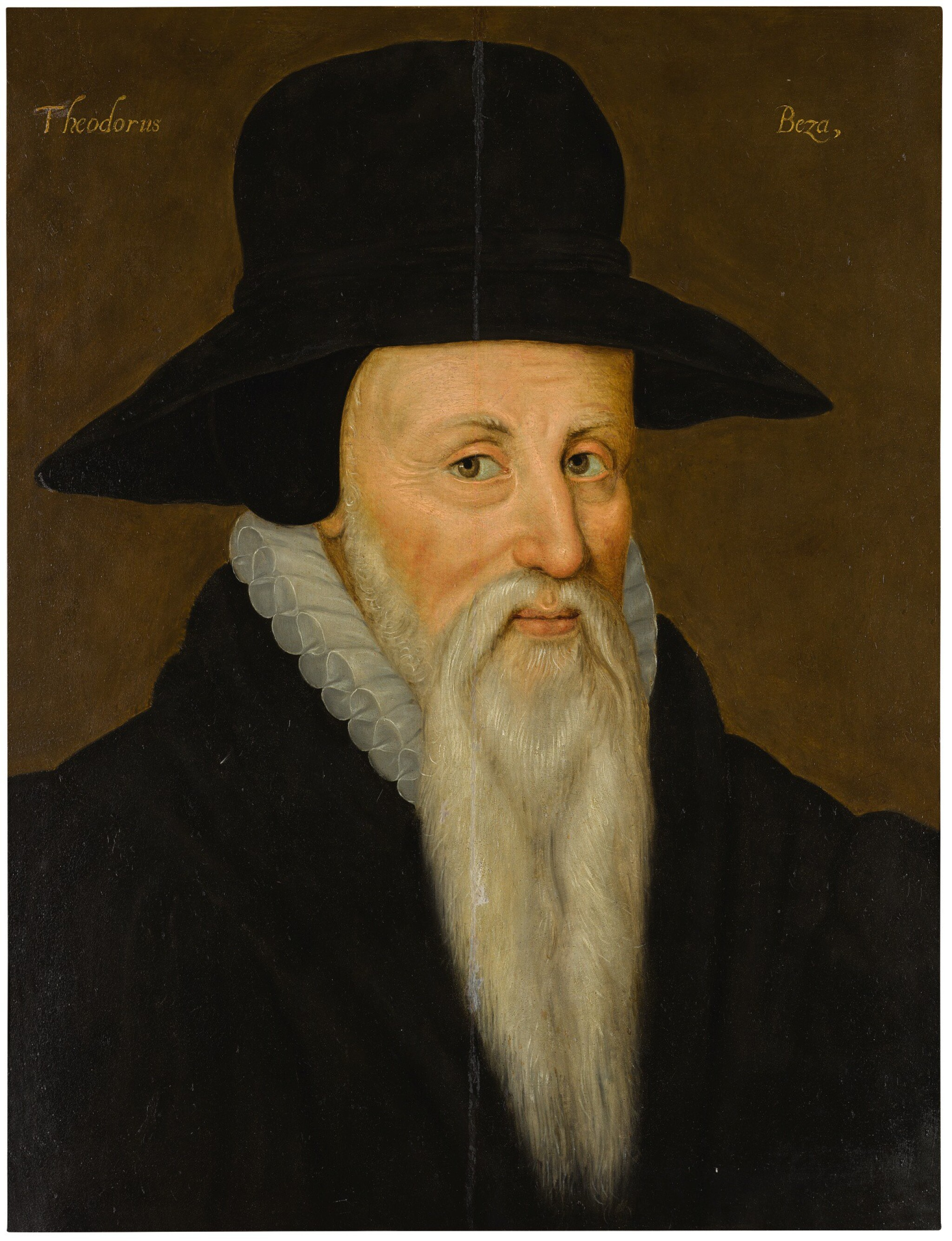
  Theodore Beza
- Michel Block, pastor, member of the conservative, Biblically faithful group, Les Attestants, and Christian pacifist.
- David Blondel (1691–1655), French clergyman, historian, classical scholar.
- Samuel Bochart (1599–1667), theologian and pacifist. Key work: Geographia Sacra seu Phaleg et Canaan.
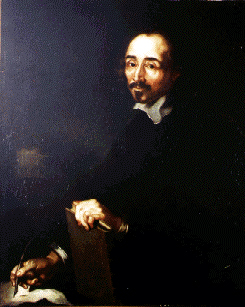
  Samuel Bochart
- Marc Boegner (1881–1970), theologian, pastor, ecumenist. Key work: Long Road to Unity: Memories and Anticipations.
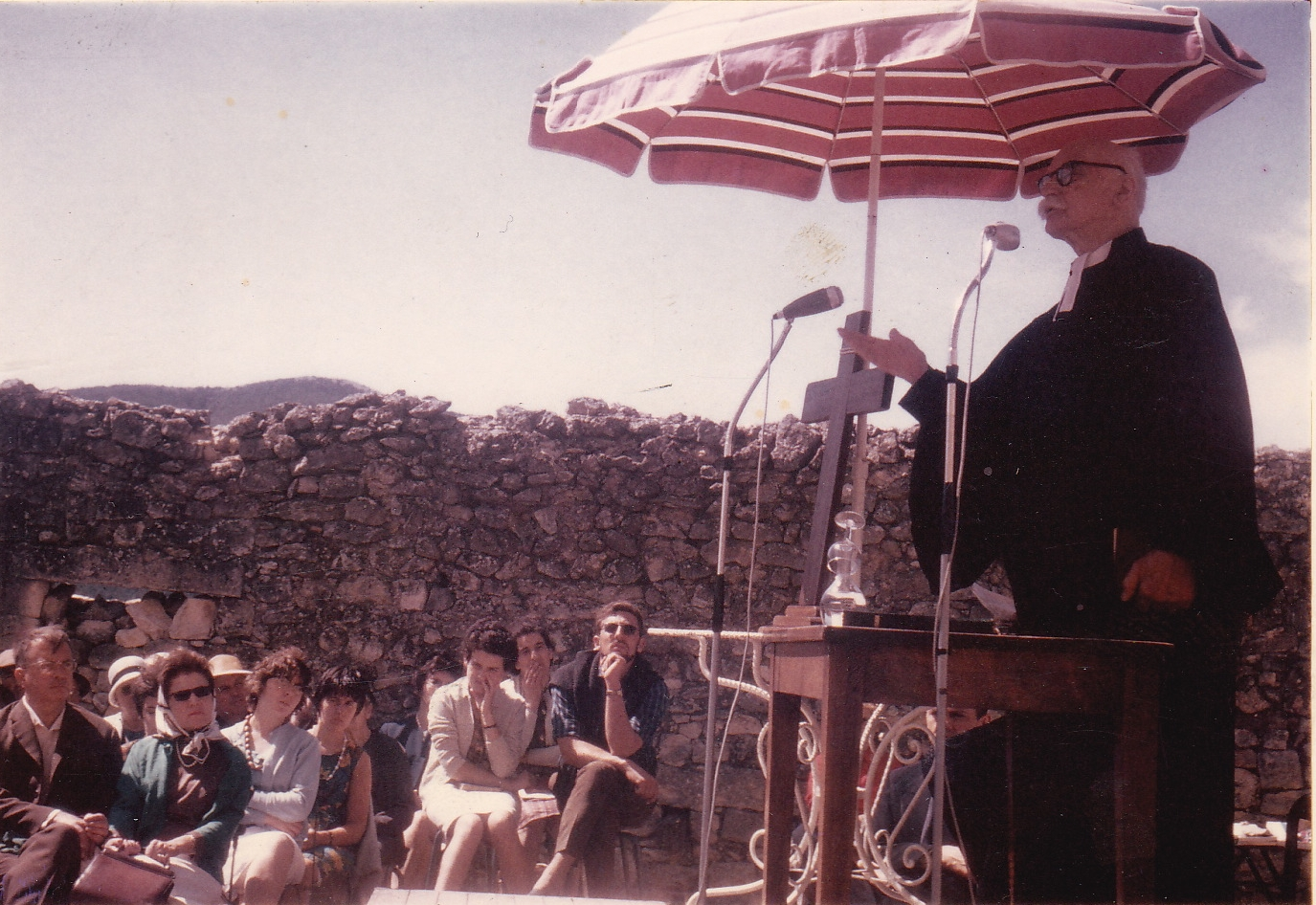
  Marc Boegner
- Laurent du Bois, Boston pastor.
- David Renaud Boullier (1699–1759), Dutch theologian and pastor, who argued animals have souls. Key work: Essay on the Soul of Beasts.
- Brother Roger (1915–2005), founder of Taizé, Christian pacifist and ecumenist. Key work: Sources of Taizé: No Greater Love.
- Harold Browne (1811–1891), English bishop.
- Pierre Brully, French pastor.
- Heinrich Bullinger (1504–1575), theologian. Key work: The Decades.
- Cecil John Cadoux, British theologian and pacifist with Huguenot ancestry. Key work: The Early Christian Attitude To War: a contribution to the history of Christian ethics.
- John Calvin (1509–1564), French theologian, pastor, and reformer. Key work: Institutes of the Christian Religion.
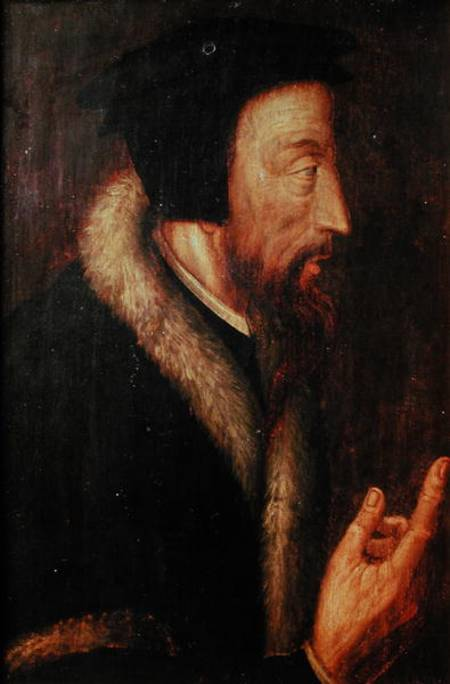
  John Calvin
- Louis Cappel, French clergyman, Hebrew scholar.
- Sebastian Castellio (1515–1563), theologian, early proponent of freedom of conscience. Key work: Advice to a Desolate France.
- Daniel Chamier, theologian, ancestor of actor Daniel Craig, co-drafter of the Edict of Nantes.
- George Champagné, Irish, Anglican minister, Canon of Windsor.
- Guillaume Chartier, theologian and missionary.
- Richard Chenevix, Irish Anglican bishop, descended from the Chenevix family of Metz, Lorraine.
- Jean Claude (1619–1687), theologian.
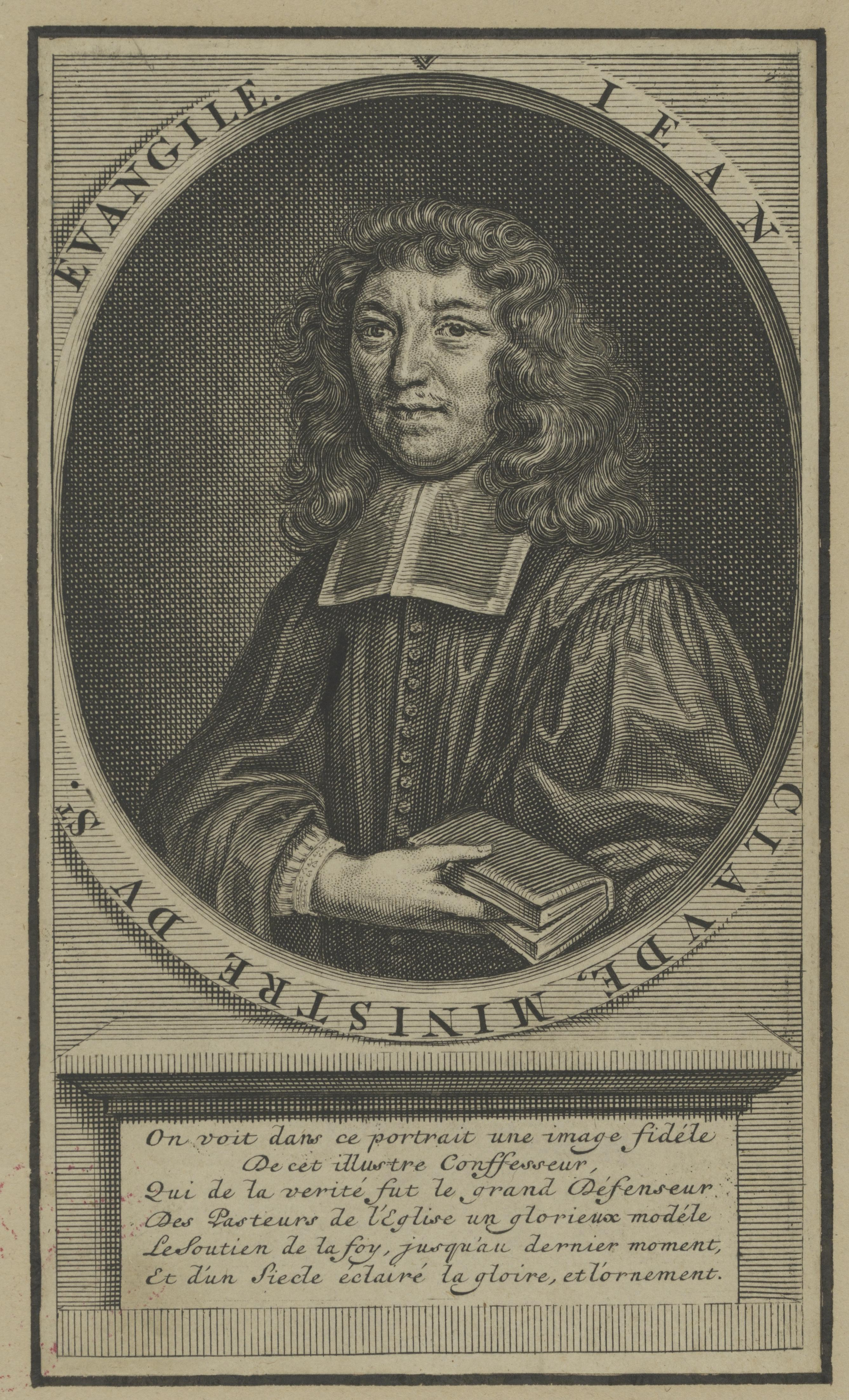
  Jean Claude
- Athanase Laurent Charles Coquerel (1795–1868), liberal theologian, elected deputy of the Constituent Assembly after the revolution of February 1848.
- Athanase Josué Coquerel (1820–1875), liberal theologian, co-founder of the Historical Society of French Protestantism. Key work: La Saint-Barthélémy.
- Jacques Couet (1546–1608), pastor.
- Antoine Court (1695–1760), pastor. Key work: An Historical Memorial of the Most Remarkable Proceedings Against the Protestants in France from 1744-51.
- Pierre Courthial (1914–2009), pastor and neo-Calvinist theologian, participated in the writing of the Pomeyrol Theses which called for spiritual resistance to Nazism, member of Association Sully, a now-defunct Protestant royalist movement. Key work: From Bible to Bible.
- Jean Crespin (1520–1572), martyrologist. Key work: Lives of the Martyrs.
- Oscar Cullmann (1902–1999), theologian and ecumenist.
- Jean Daillé (1594–1670), French theologian. Key work: Apology for the French Reformed Churches.
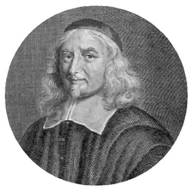
  Jean Daillé
- Lambert Daneau (1530–1590), theologian. Key work: Wonderful Workmanship of the World.
- Charles Daubuz (1673–1713), pastor, theologian, eschatologist. Key work: A Perpetual Commentary on the Revelation of St. John.
- Luke de Beaulieu, cleric. Key work: A discourse shewing that Protestants are on the safer side, notwithstanding the uncharitable judgment of their adversaries and that their religion is the surest way to heaven.
- Isaac de Beausobre (1659–1738), pastor.
- Guillaume de Clermont, pastor, regional synod president.
- Odet de Coligny (1517–1571), former Roman Catholic cardinal, convert to Protestantism.
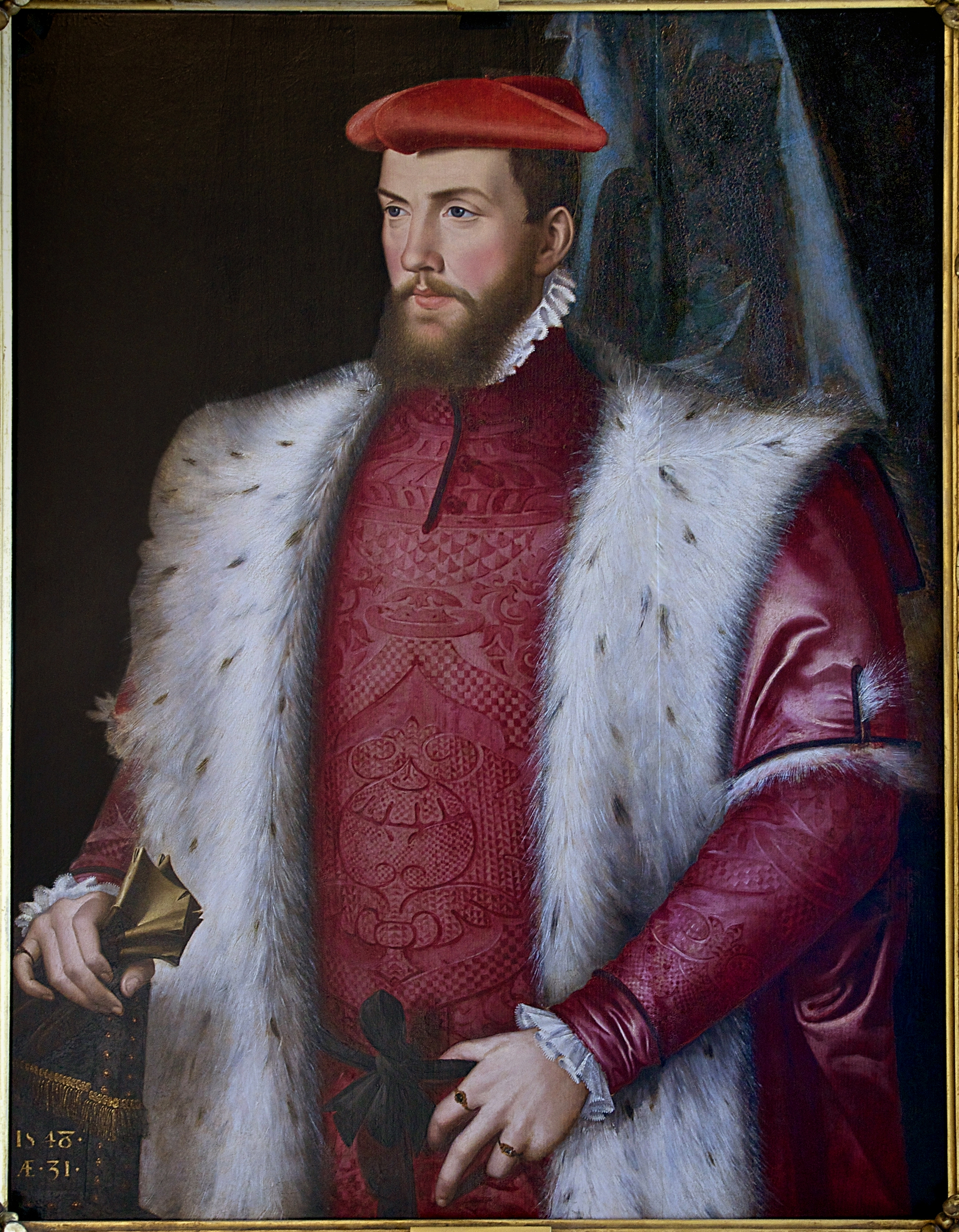
  Odet de Coligny
- Suzanne de Dietrich (1891–1981), theologian, Cimade worker, co-writer of the Pomeyrol Theses and pacifist (French Lutheran).
- Guillaume de Félice, Comte de Panzutti, French abolitionist, theologian.
- Jessé de Forest, leader of a group of Walloon-Huguenots who fled Europe due to religious persecutions.
- Jean de Labadie (1610–1674), Jesuit convert to Calvinism, founder of the pietistic Labadists.
- Josué de la Place (c. 1596 – 1665 or possibly 1655), pastor and theologian.
- Antoine de la Roche Chandieu, Parisian pastor, co-author with Calvin of the Galllican Confession of Faith.
- Jean Delpech, pastor.
- Philippe de Mornay (1549–1623), theologian. Key work (likely author): Vindiciae contra tyrannos.
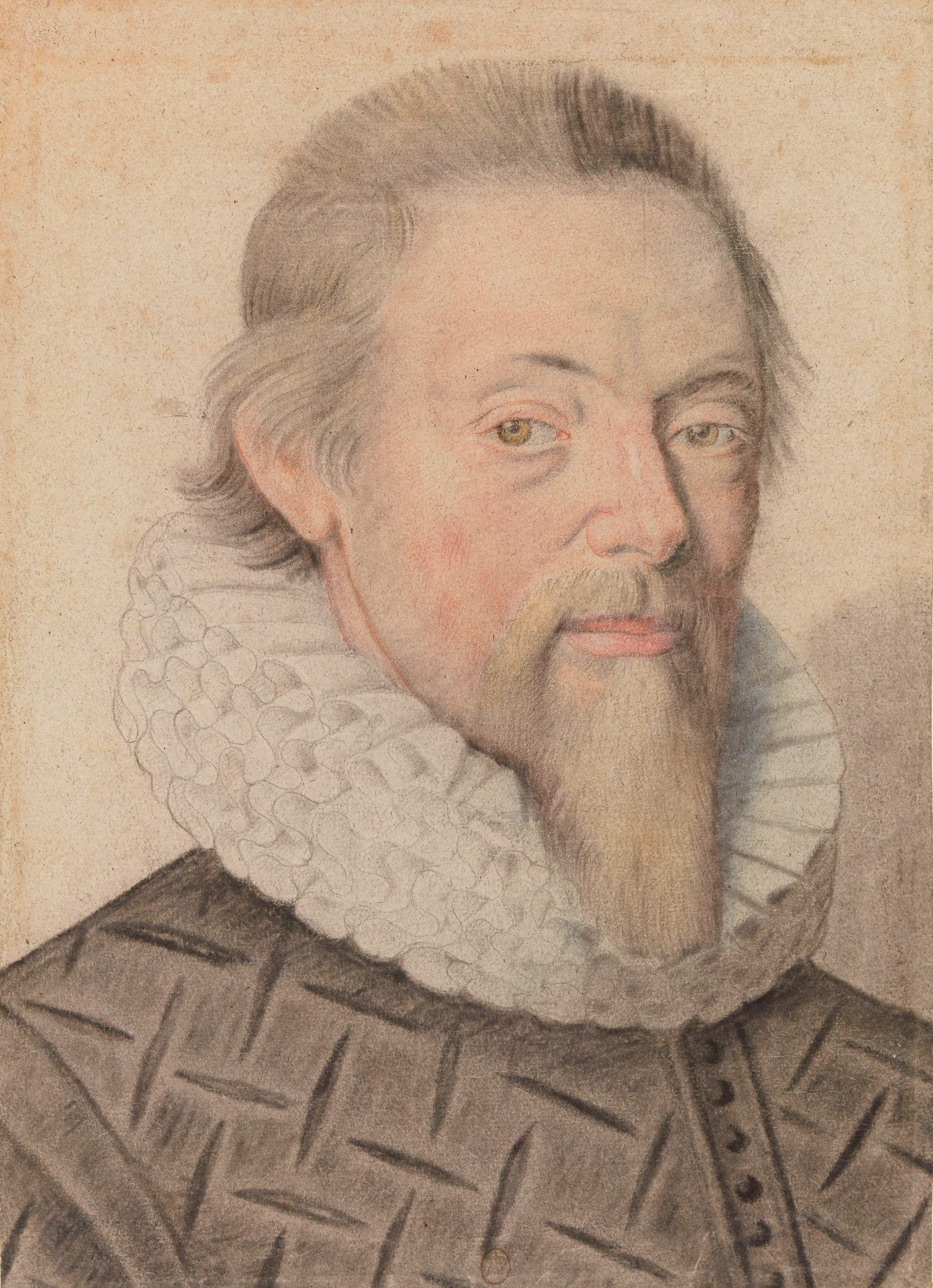
  Philippe de Mornay
- Antoine-Noé de Polier de Bottens (1713–1783), theologian.
- Edmond de Pressensé (1824–1891), student of Alexandre Vinet, theologian, pastor, writer, first president of the Human Rights League, father of Francis de Pressensé. Key work: Jesus Christ : his times, life, and work.
- Roland de Pury (1907–1979), pastor, anti-Nazi activist, saviour of Jews in World War Two, opponent of the use of torture in the Algerian War and anti-Communist. He is the author of a Cell Journal written during his captivity by the Nazis. He was a signatory of the Pomeyrol Theses.
- Nicolas des Gallars (1520–1580), theologian, pastor at Threadneedle Street.
- Daniel de Superville (1657–1728), pastor.
- Charles Drelincourt (1595–1669), pastor. Key work: The Christian's Defence Against the Fears of Death.
- Laurent Drelincourt (1626–1681), theologian, pastor, poet, son of Charles Drelincourt.
- William Porcher DuBose (1836–1918), theologian, Episcopal priest, author
- Jacob Duché (1737–1798), pastor in Philadelphia, USA.
- Pierre Du Moulin (1568–1658), pastor. Key works: Tyranny that the Popes Exercised for Some Centuries Over the kings of England and The Christian Combate, or, A treatise of Affliction: with a Prayer and Meditation of the Faithfull Soule.
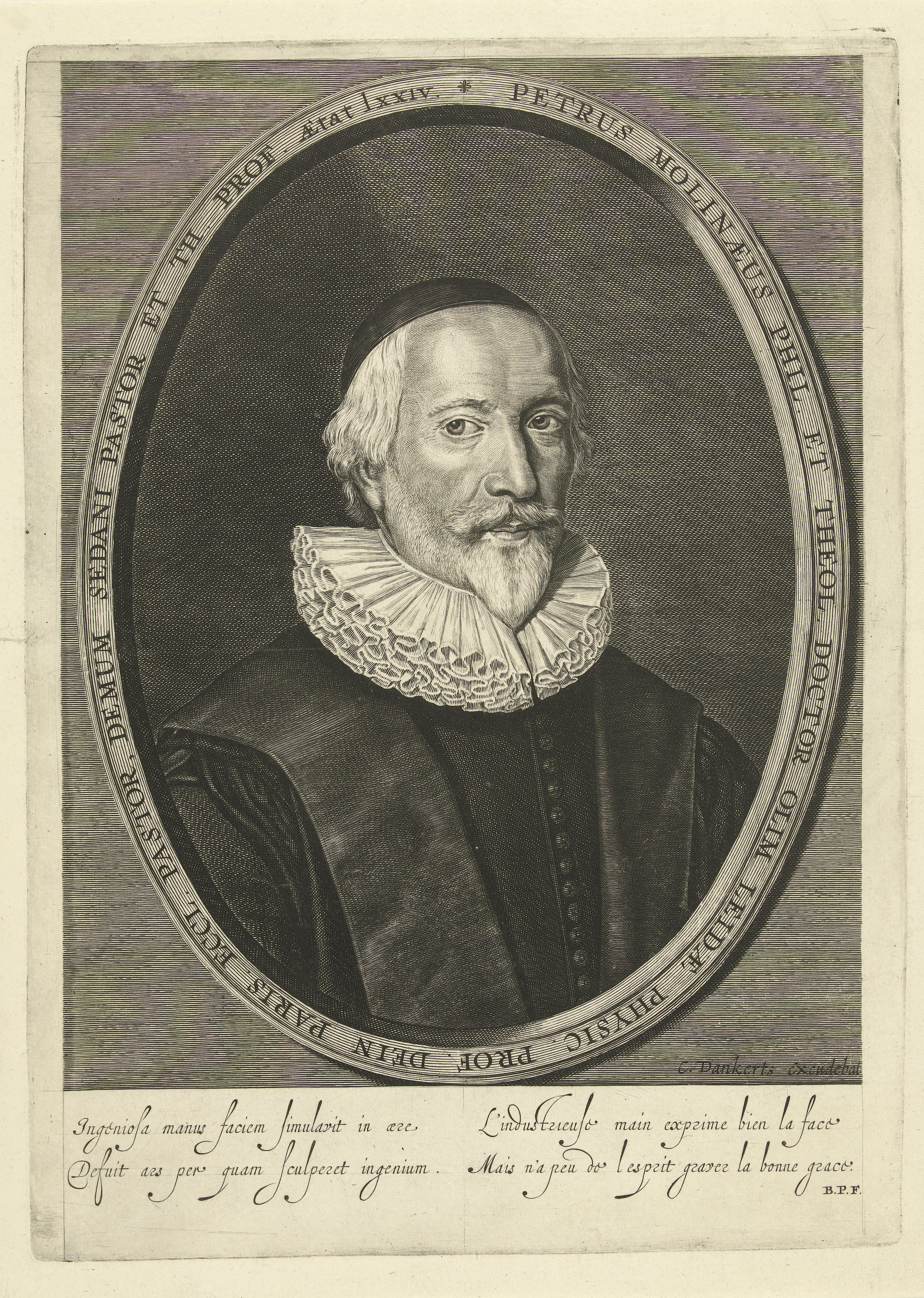
  Pierre Du Moulin
- John Durel, pastor who later became an Anglican minister.
- Theodore Dury (Du Ry) (born 1661), pastor.
- Jacques Ellul (1912–1994), theologian and pacifist. Key work: Propaganda: The Formation of Men's Attitudes.
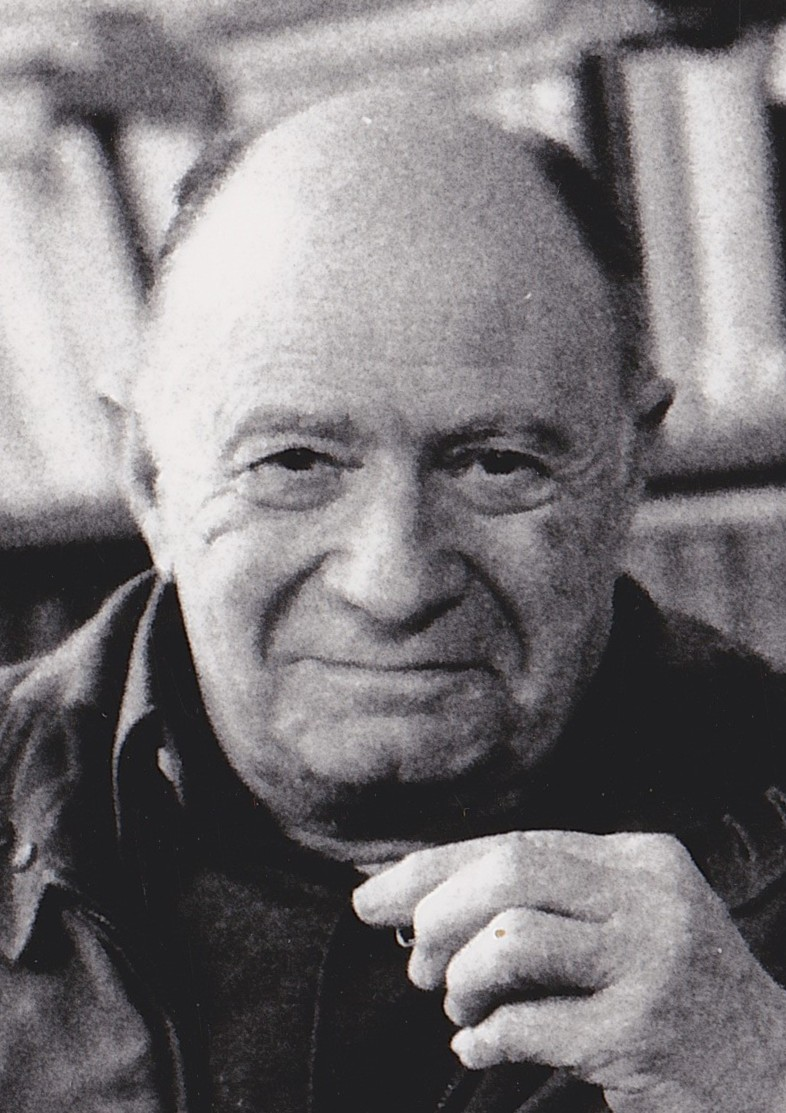
  Jacques Ellul
- Tommy Fallot (1844–1904), pastor, founder of Social Christianity. Key work: Christianisme social, études et fragments (French Lutheran).
- William Farel (1489–1565), theologian who recruited Calvin to Geneva.
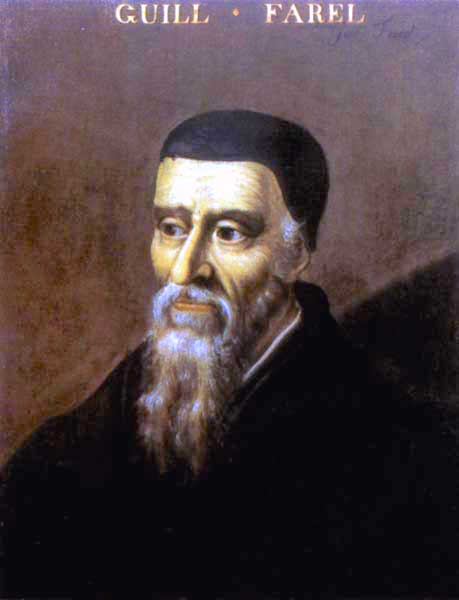
  William Farel
- Abraham Faure (1795–1875), South African pastor and author.
- Jacques Fontaine, pastor in Cork, weaver, fisherman.
- Johann Heinrich Samuel Formey (1711–1797), Huguenot pastor, journaqlist, author, educator, secretary of the Berlin Academy of Science, man of letters, theologian and historian.
- Gaston Frommel (1862–1906), French theologian.
- Jacques Gaillard, pastor and theologian.
- John Gano, Baptist preacher and Revolutionary War chaplain.
- John Gast (1715–1788), Irish minister.
- François Gaussen (1790–1863), pastor and eschatologist, Calvinist who was influential on the early Seventh Day Adventists. Key works: Theopneusty; Or, the Plenary Inspiration of the Holy Scriptures and The Prophet Daniel Explained. In a Series of Readings for Young Persons.
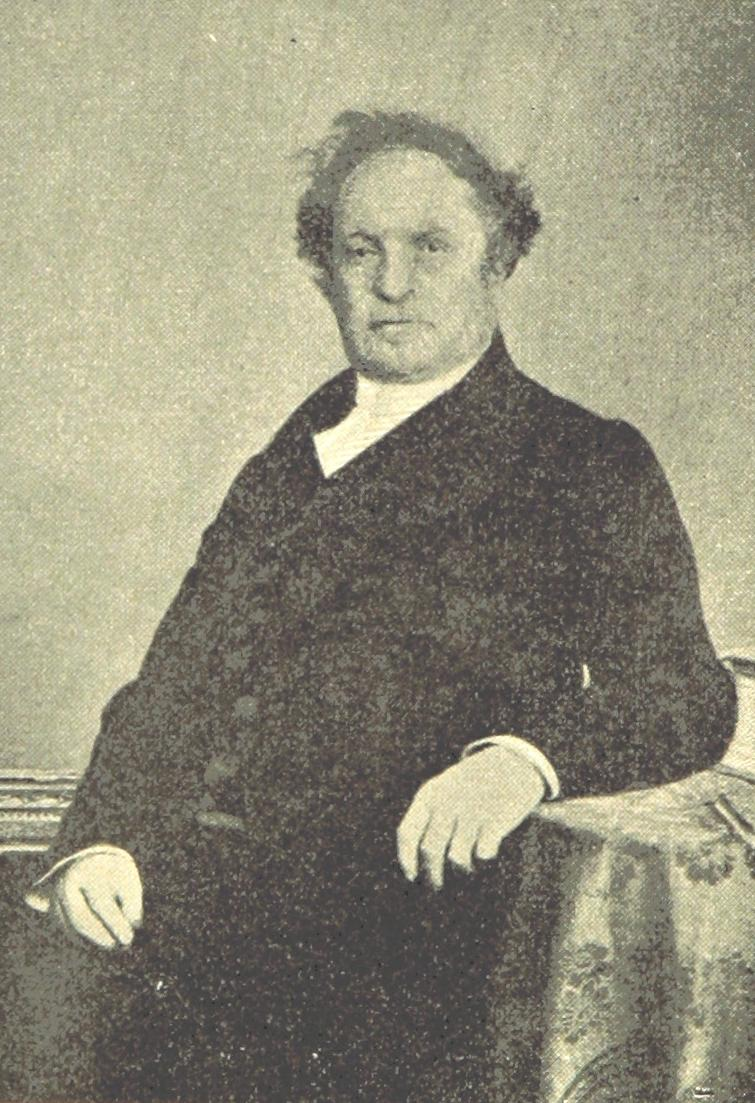
  François Gaussen
- Simon Goulart (1543–1628), pastor, theologian and poet.
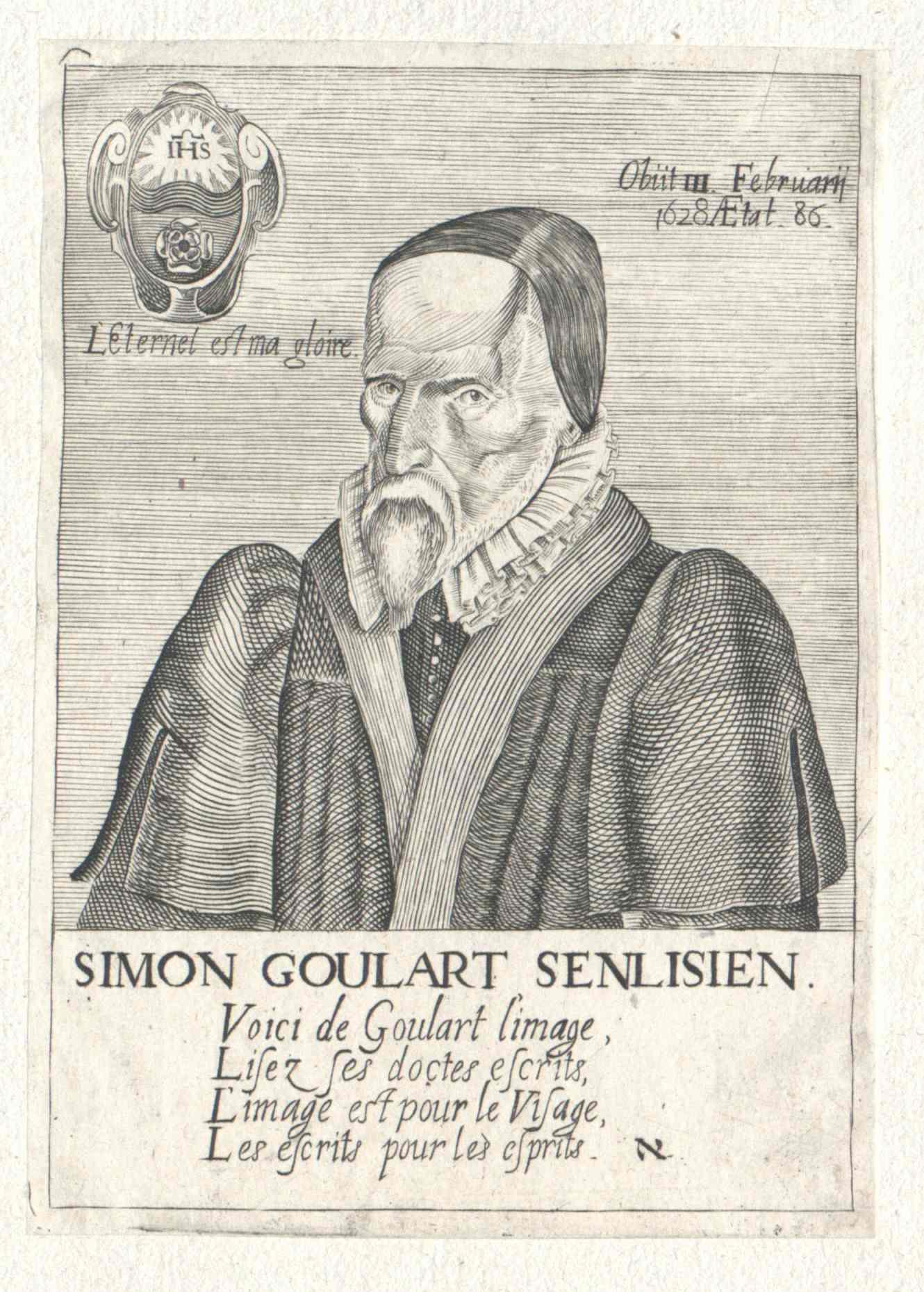
  Simon Goulart
- Rémi Gounelle (1967–), theologian, nephew of André Gounelle.
- Heinrich Grüber (1891–1975), theologian, opponent of Nazism and pacifist.
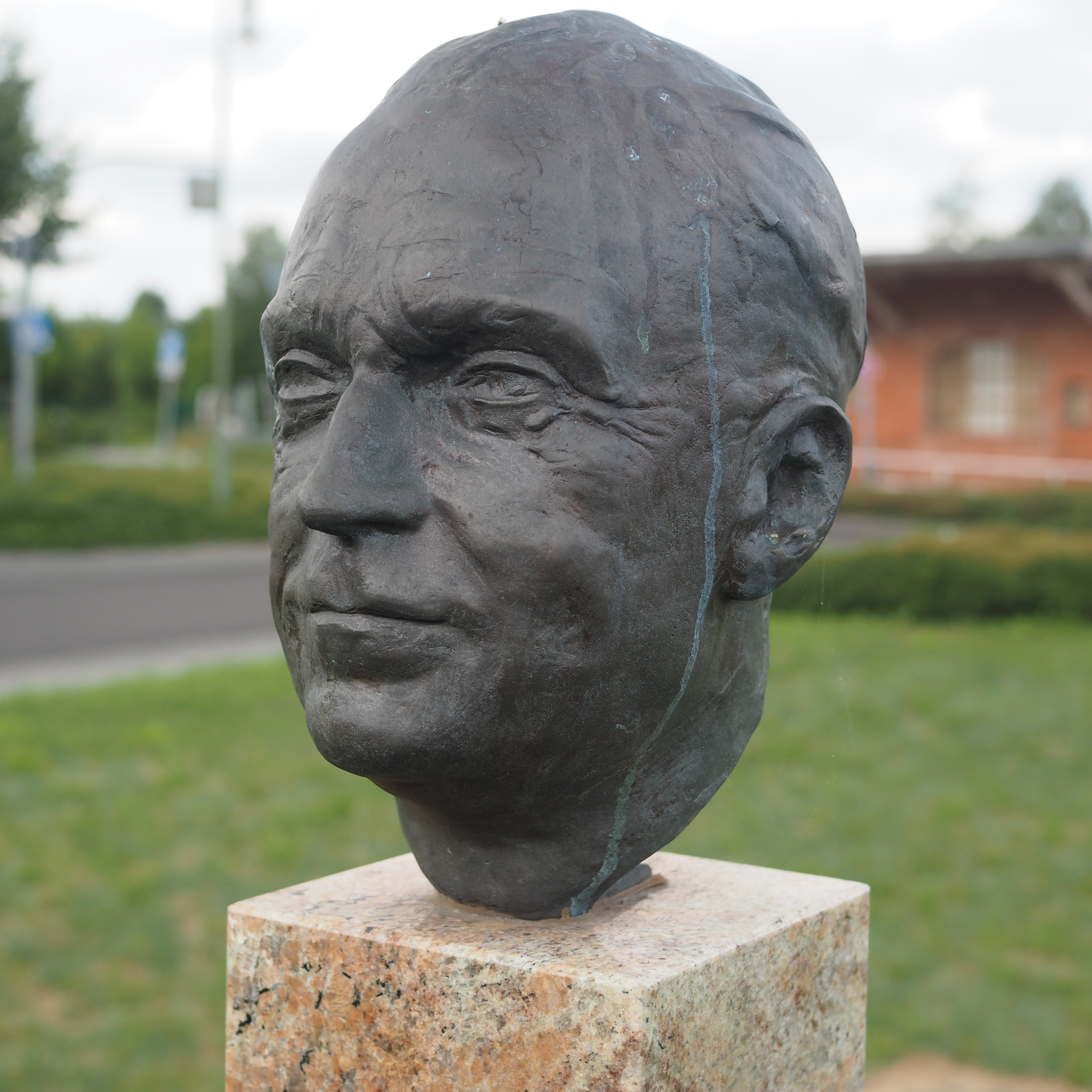
  Heinrich Grüber
- François Hotman (1524–1590), theologian. Key work: Francogallia.
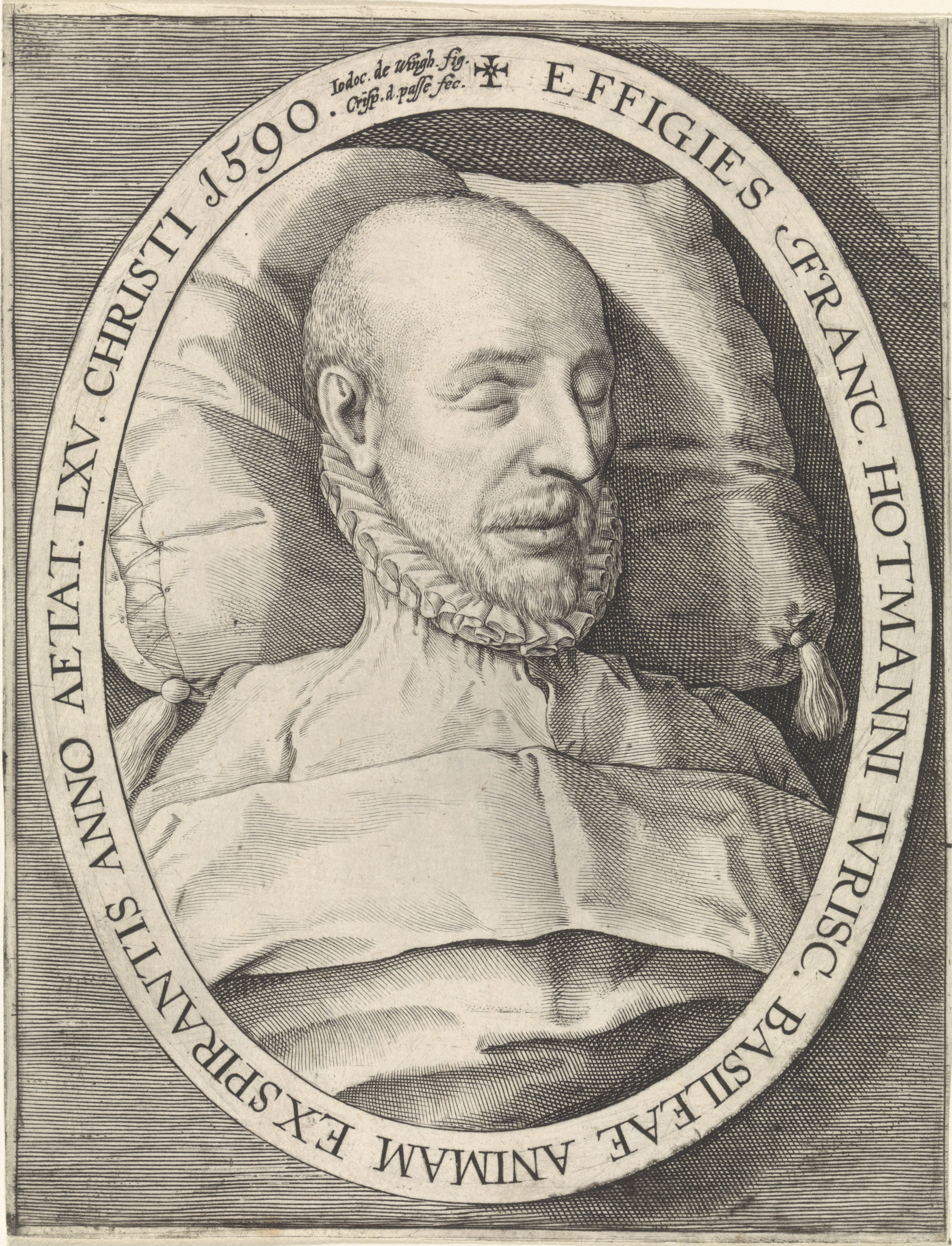
  François Hotman
- Pierre Jurieu, French pastor, orthodox Calvinist theologian and eschatologist. Key work: Pastoral Letters.
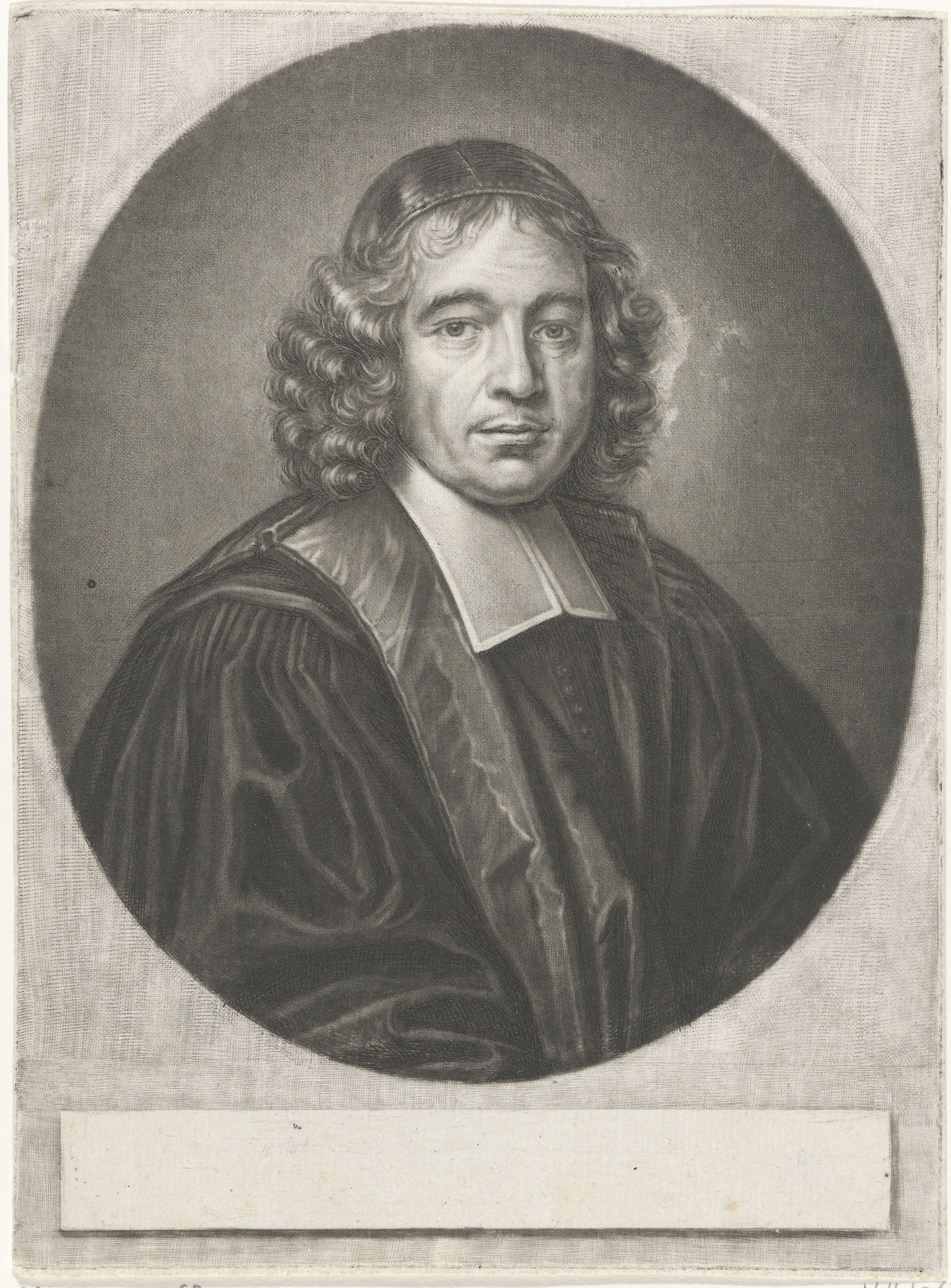
  Pierre Jurieu
- Isaac La Peyrère (1596–1676), theologian, writer and lawyer, forced to convert to Roman Catholicism, retract his writings and spend his final years in a monastery.
- Jean Lasserre (1908–1983), conservative, Biblically orthodox theologian, pastor and pacifist. Key work: War and the Gospel
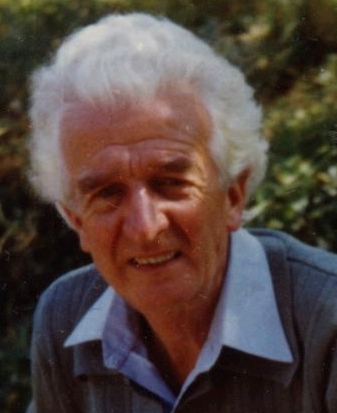
  Jean Lasserre
- Charles Layard (1750–1803), English clergyman.
- Auguste Lecerf (1872–1943), pastor, neo-Calvinist theologian, specialist on the thought of Jean Calvin, member of Association Sully, a now-defunct Protestant royalist movement. Key work: An Introduction to Reformed Dogmatics.
- Jean Le Clerc (1657–1736), theologian, journalist and man of letters.
- Robert Le Maçon seigneur de la Fontaine, pastor, Threadneedle Street.
- Andrew Le Mercier (1692–1764), pastor and writer.
- Paul Lorrain (died 1719), secretary to Samuel Pepys, ordinary of Newgate Prison
- Andrew Lortie, theologian.
- Francina Susanna Louw, missionary, linguist, sister of South African president C. F. Malan and descendant of Jacques Malan of Provence.
- Antoine Marcourt, pastor (the Posters Incident).
- Paul-Henri Marron (1754–1832), first pastor to work in Paris after Protestantism was legalised because of the French Revolution.
- Jacques Martin (1906–2001), pastor, pacifist, pioneer French conscientous objector, saviour of Jews in World War Two.
- Joseph Martin-Paschoud (1802–1873), liberal pastor, pacifist, supporter of Frédéric Passy's peace society, supporter of French Judaism.
- Basil Maturin, Anglican minister and writer who later converted to Roman Catholicism, Lusitania torpedoeing victim, grandson of Charles Maturin.
- Gabriel Maturin (1700–1746), Irish clergyman and philanthropist
- Jacques Maury (1920–2020), pastor, president of the French Protestant Federation.
- Pierre Maury (1890–1956), pastor.
- Pierre Merlin (died 1603), chaplain to Coligny, later pastor at La Rochelle and synod head.
- Eugène Ménégoz (1838–1921), symbolo-fideist,liberal theologian (French Lutheran), anti-pacifist and promoter of Just War Theory.
- Caesar de Missy (1703–1775), pastor, Savoy, London, chaplain to King George III.
- Adolphe Monod (1802–1856), pastor.
- Frédéric Monod (1794–1863), pastor.
- Wilfred Monod (1867–1943), liberal theologian, Social Christianity supporter, founder of the Order of Watchers, argued for rehabilitation of Marcion and for the removal of omnipotence and omnipresence from the conception of God.
- Pierre Mouchon (1733–1797), pastor and grandfather of journalist and social worker, Eugénie Niboyet.
- Andrew Murray, South African, pastor, teacher and writer, Huguenot descendant on his mother's side.
- Wolfgang Musculus (1497–1563), theologian.
- Beyers Naudé, South African anti-apartheid cleric.
- Jozua Francois Naudé (1873–1948), South African pastor, school founder and co-founder of the Afrikaner Broederbond.
- Elias Neau, Former galley slave, opponent of slavery in the United States, school founder.
- Samuel Nevill (1837–1921), the first Anglican Bishop of Dunedin and, later, Primate of New Zealand.
- Claude Pajon (1626–1685), pastor.
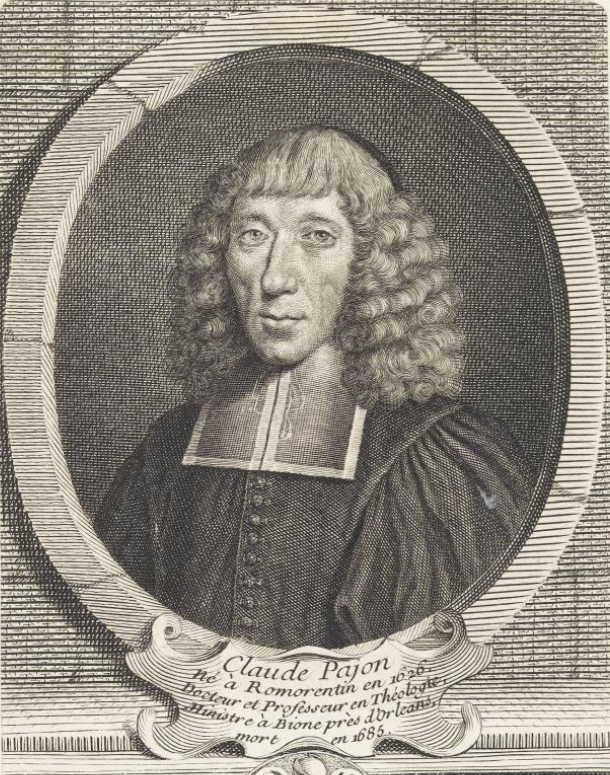
  Claude Pajon
- Elias Palairet (1713–1765), brother of Jean Palairet, pastor successively at the French church at Greenwich, Saint John's Church, Spitalfields, and the Dutch chapel at Saint James's, Westminster, classical and Biblical philologist.
- Félix Pécaut (1828–1898), pastor and educator.
- Simon Pelloutier (1694–1757), French pastor in Berlin.
- Jean Pradel, pastor.
- Samuel Provoost (1742–1815), American clergyman.
- Paul Rabaut (1718–1794), pastor.
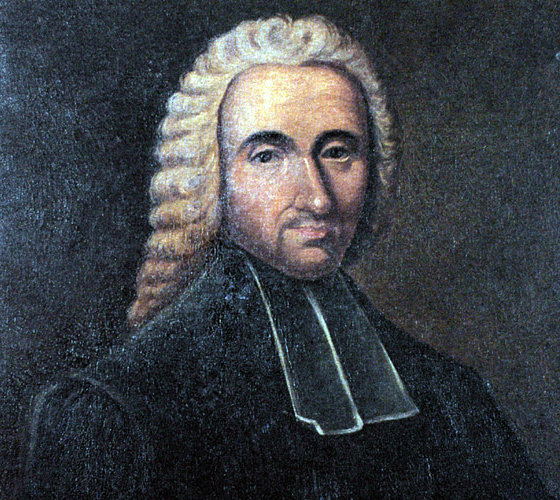
  Paul Rabaut
- Jacques Reclus (1796–1882), pastor.
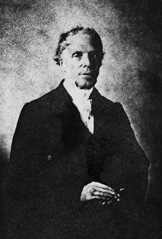
  Jacques Reclus
- Charles Renouvier, theologian.
- Cyril Restieaux (1910–1996), Former Ordinary of the Roman Catholic Diocese of Plymouth.
- Albert Réville (1826–1906), pastor, extreme liberal theologian, Dreyfus supporter.
- Pierre Richier (c. 1506–1580), French theologian and missionary.
- André Rivet (1572–1651), theologian.
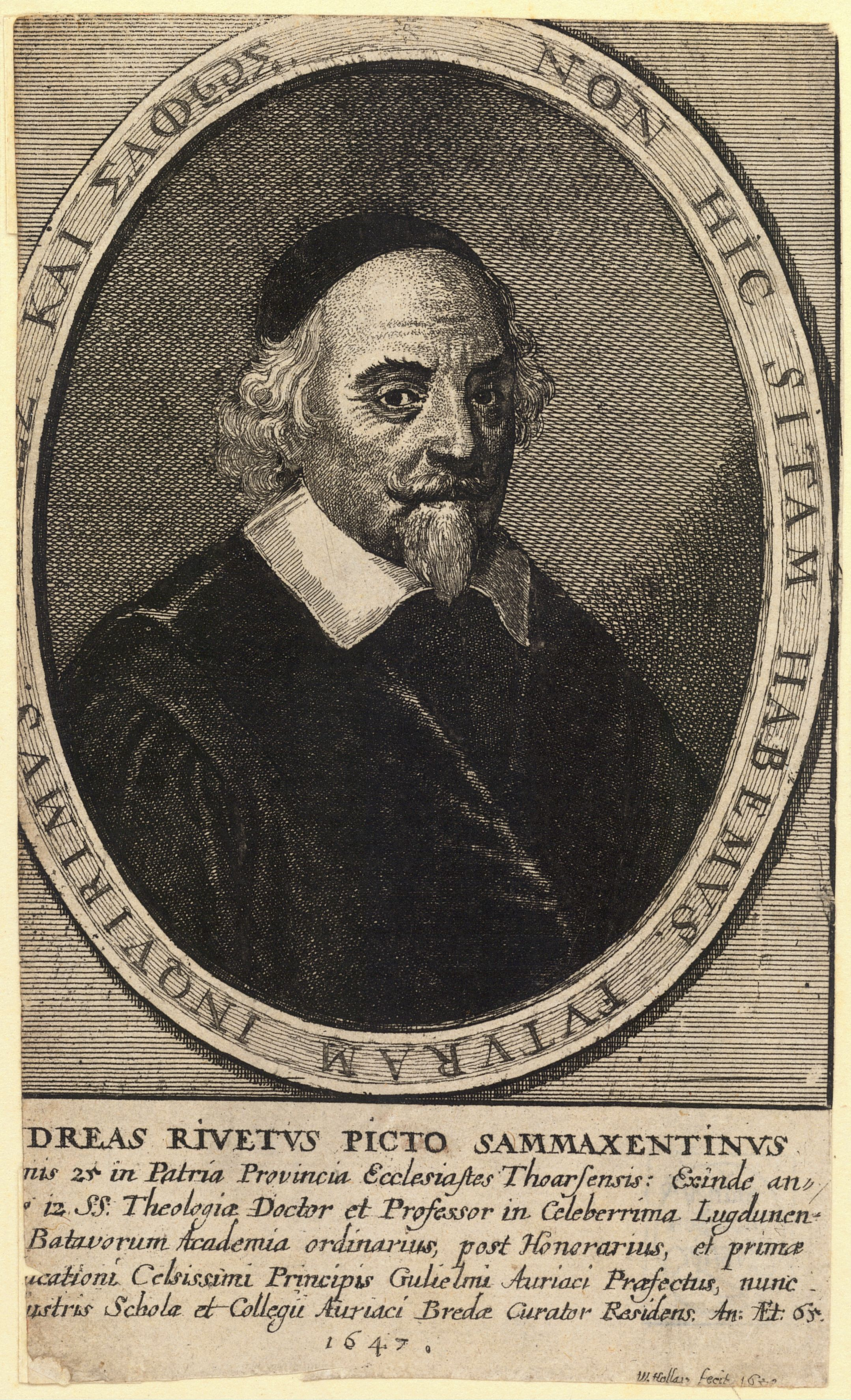
  André Rivet
- Albert Rivett (1855–1934), Australian Congregationalist minister and pacifist, father of the scientist, David Rivett.
- William Romaine (1714–1795), evangelical Anglican minister. Key work: The Life, Walk and Triumph of Faith.
- Pierre Roques (1685–1748), pastor.
- Auguste Sabatier (1839–1901), symbolofideist, called by some "the greatest French theologian since Calvin", expert on dogma and the links between theology and culture (French Lutheran).
- Jacques Saurin (1677–1730), pastor, Threadneedle Street and the Netherlands refugee communities, early advocate of religious tolerance. Key work: Sermons on Diverse Texts of the Scriptures.
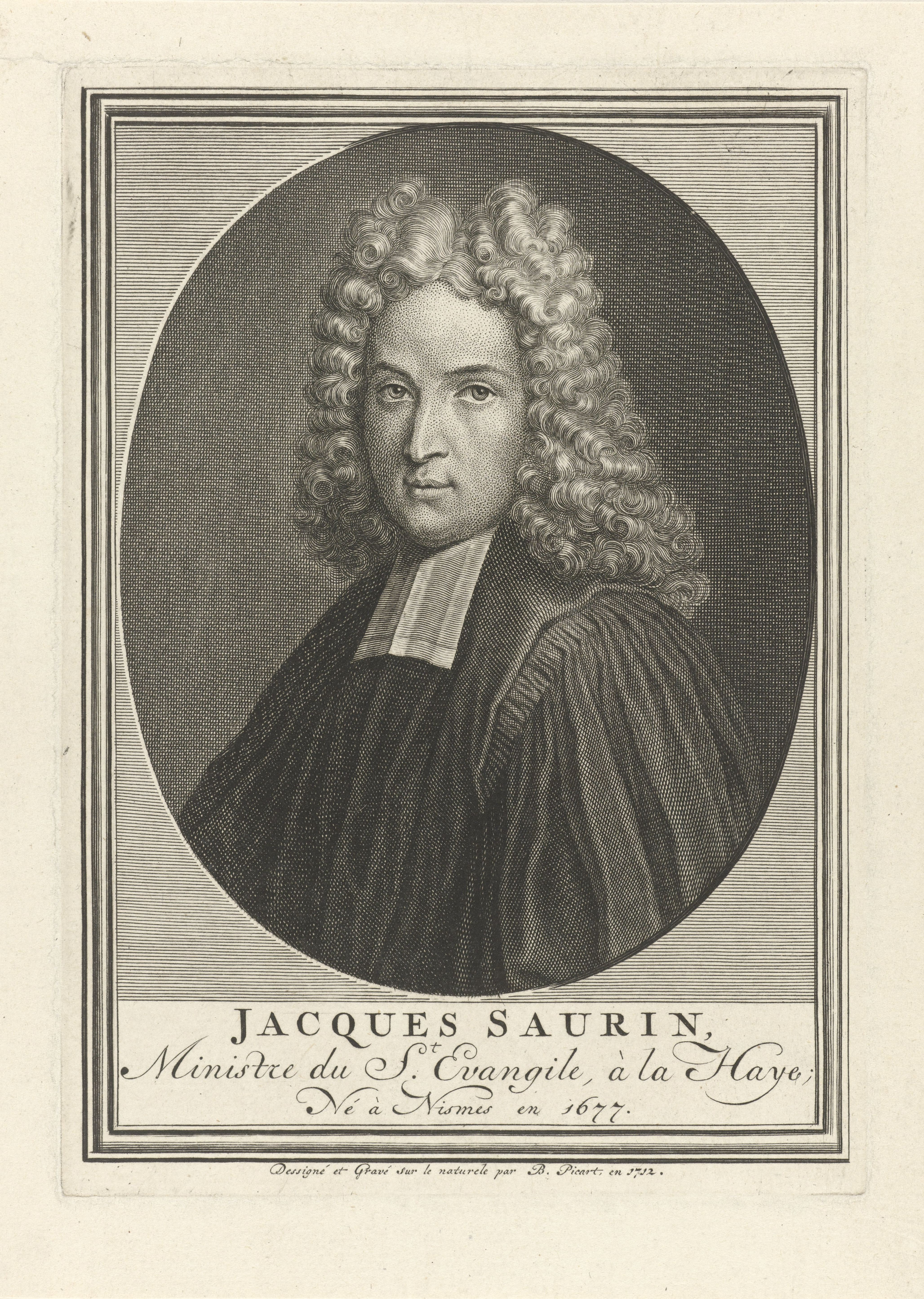
  Jacques Saurin
- Edmond Scherer (1815–1889), liberal theologian, agnostic.
- Laurent Schlumberger (1957–), first President of the United Protestant Church of France from 2013 to 2017.
- Albert Schweitzer (1875–1965), liberal/unorthodox theologian and pastor, missionary, hospital founder, organist, musicologist, writer, humanitarian, philosopher, physician, had pacifist leanings, Nobel Peace Prize winner 1953, Lutheran from Alsace.
- Jules Siegfried, pastor and pacifist.
- Sydney Smith (1771–1845), Essex-born Anglican minister and humorist, founder of the Edinburgh Review, lecturer at the Royal Institution and remembered for his comical rhyming recipe for salad dressing, descendant of Olier family.
- Charles Spurgeon (1834–1892), first pastor of the Metropolitan Tabernacle, founder of a theological college, almshouses and orphanage, writer.
- Charles Terrot (1790–1872), Scottish Episcopalian minister, theologian and mathematician.
- Albert Thibaudet, pastor, pacifist.
- Daniel Toussain (1541–1602), pastor, Basel.
- André Trocmé (1901–1971), French Biblically conservative but socially progressive pastor, Christian pacifist, saviour of Jews in World War Two and anti-nuclear campaigner. Key work: Jesus and the Nonviolent Revolution.
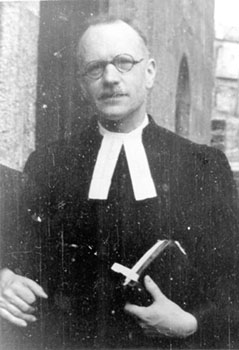
  André Trocmé
- Alexandre Vinet (1797–1847), theologian, considered the most important thinker of nineteenth century French-speaking Protestantism. Key work: Homiletics; or the Theory of Preaching.
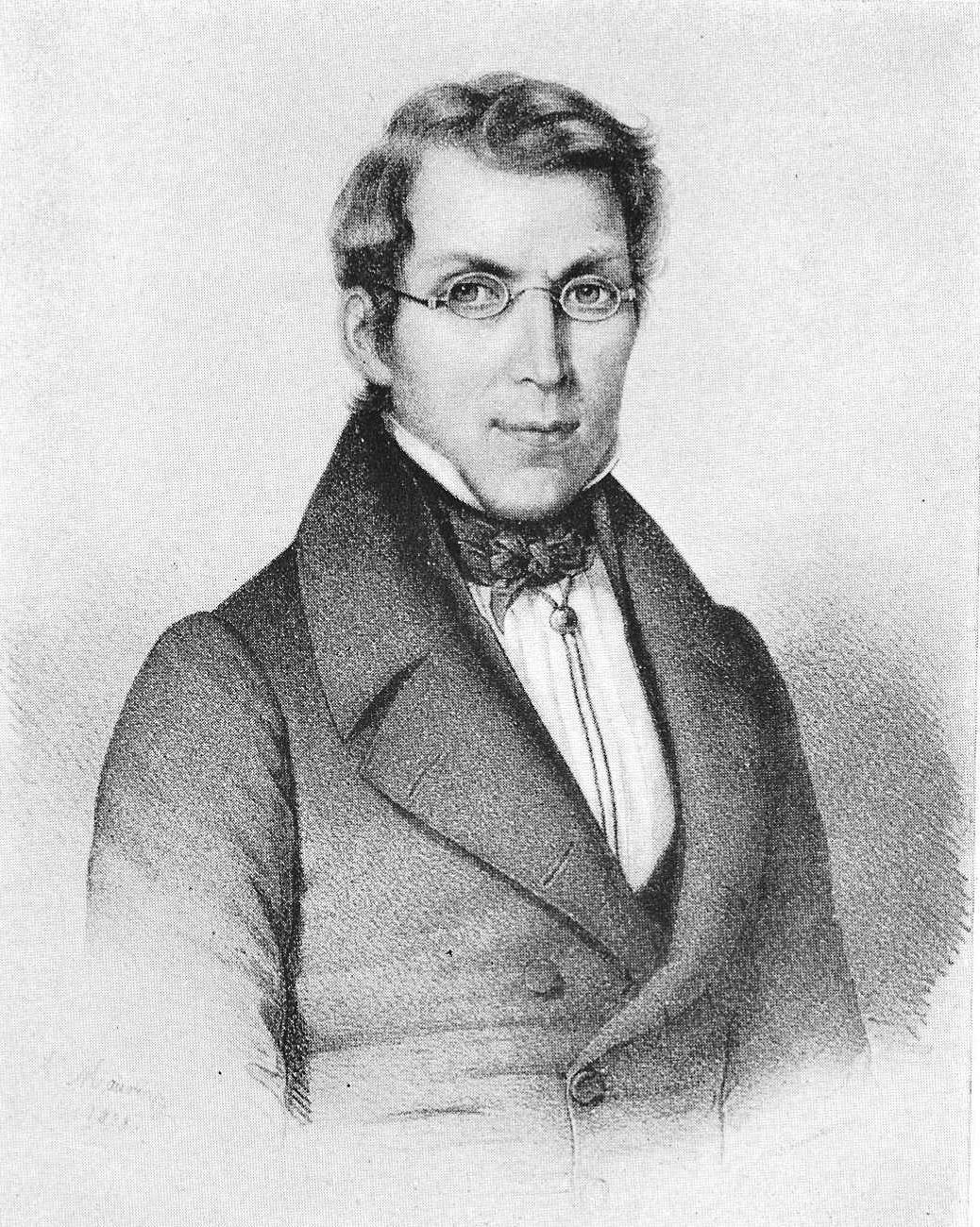
  Alexandre Vinet
- Pierre Viret (1511–1572), theologian. Key work: Thou Shalt Not Kill.
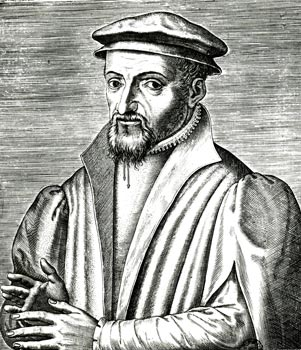
  Pierre Viret
- Charles Wagner (1852–1918), pastor, liberal theologian, Social Christianity advocate.
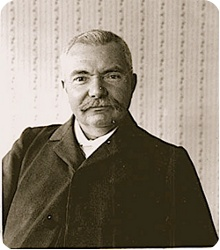
  Charles Wagner

== Philanthropists and charity workers ==
- Madeleine Barot (1909–1995), laywoman, saviour of Jews in World War Two, co-writer of the Pomeyrol Theses, evangelist, ecumenist, vice-president of Christian Action for the Abolition of Torture, general secretary of La Cimade.
- John Bost (1817–1881), pastor, musician and philanthropist, founder of La Famille (the Family) asylum at La Force in Dordogne for children, orphans, the disabled and incurables. It was followed by a number of other asylums, run today by the John Bost Foundation.
- Antoinette Butte (1898–1986), French Girl Scouts co-founder.
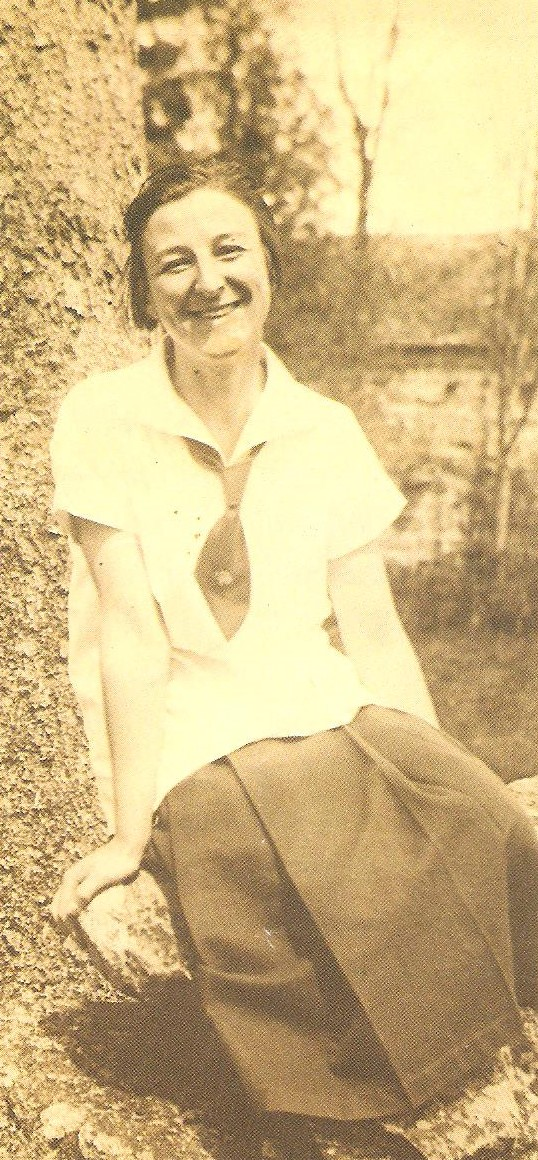
  Antoinette Butte
- Suzanne Curchod (1737–1794), hospital founder, writer and salonist, wife of Jacques Necker.
- Guillaume de Clermont, pastor and director of the John Bost Foundation.
- Jacques de Gastigny (died 1708), master of the royal buckhounds, philanthropist whose bequest was used to found the London French Hospital.
- Pierre de La Primaudaye, a governor of the London French Hospital.
- Malcolm Delevingne (1868–1950), Barnado's charity worker, occupational health and safety and anti-drug advocate, public servant.
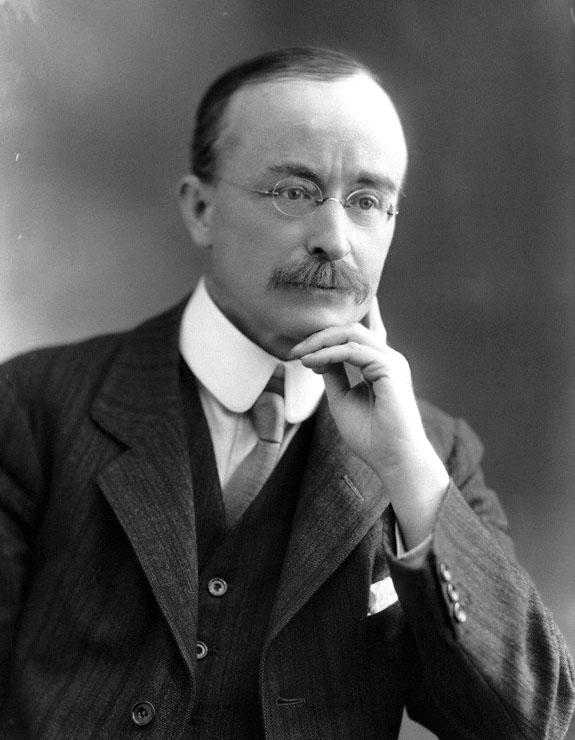
  Malcolm Delevingne
- Marguerite de Witt-Schlumberger (1853–1924), philanthropist and non-violent resistor to German rule in Alsace.
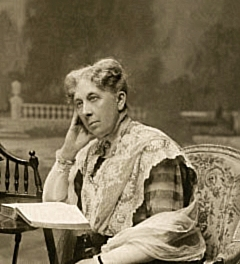
  Marguerite de Witt-Schlumberger
- Jenny d'Héricourt (1809–1875), French social activist and midwife.
- Henri Dunant (1828–1910), founder of the Red Cross, Nobel Peace Prize winner.
- Jane Franklin (1791–1875), wife of Sir John Franklin, First Lady of Tasmania, philanthropist, patron of the arts, descended from the Griffin and Guillemard silkweaving families.
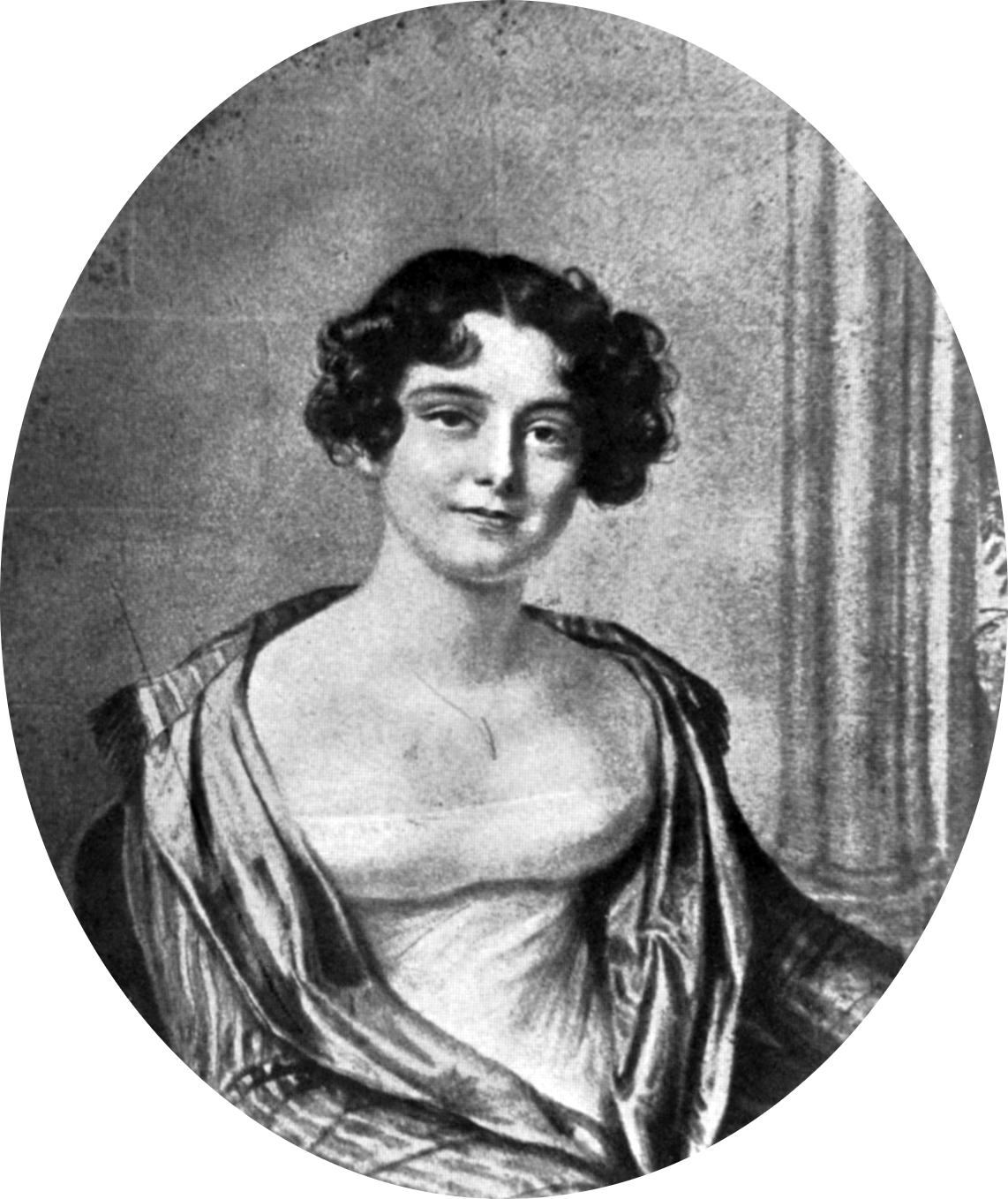
  Jane Franklin
- Daniel Legrand (1783–1858), philanthropist and industrialist, grandfather of Tommy Fallot.
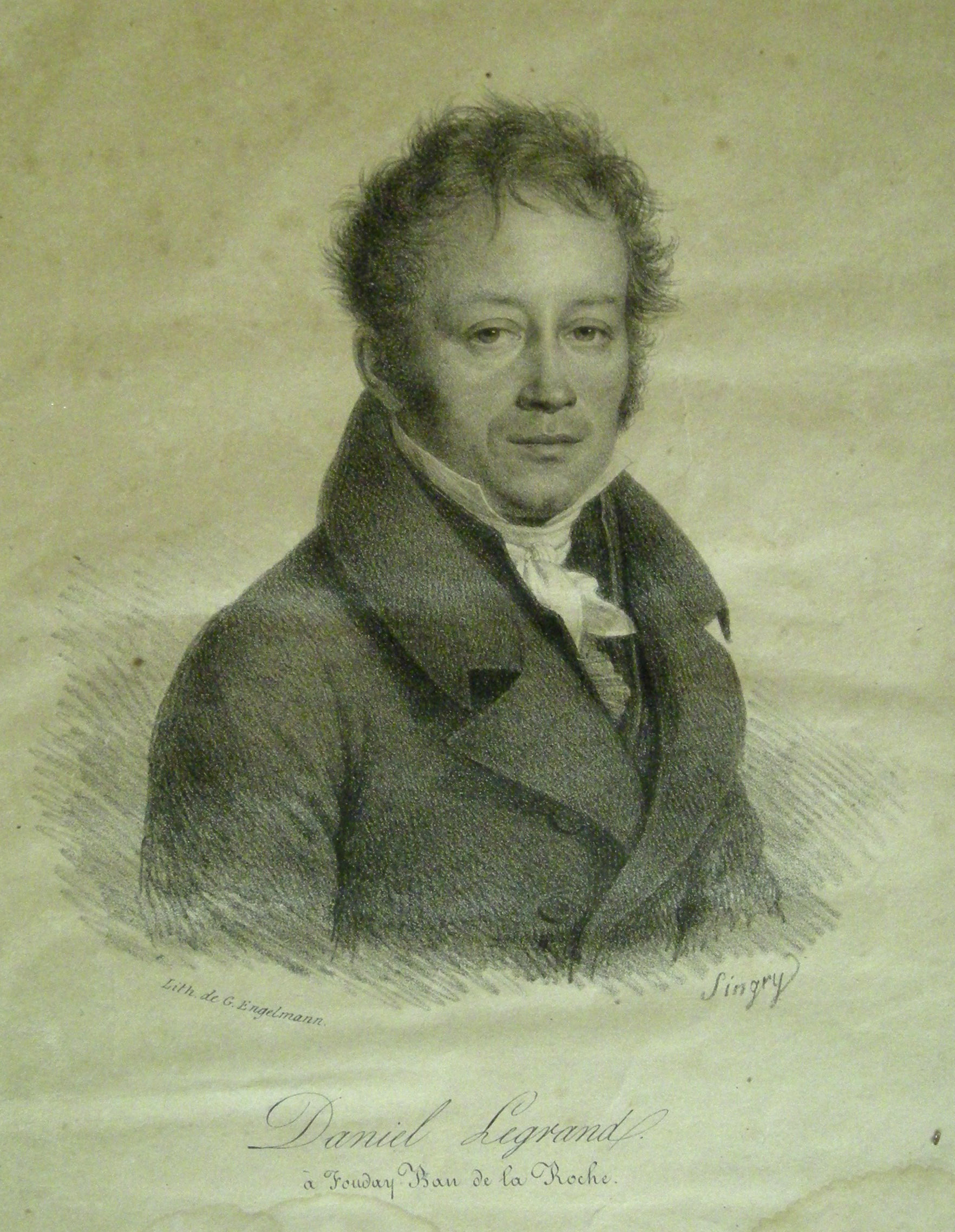
  Daniel Legrand
- Philippe Ménard, founder of the London French Hospital.
- Sarah Monod (1836–1912), philanthropist and feminist, daughter of Adolphe Monod.
- Felix Neff (1798–1829), pastor and philanthropist.
- Eugénie Niboyet (1796–1883), French social worker, journalist, founder of continental Europe's first avowedly pacifist newspaper, La Paix de Deux Mondes, granddaughter of pastor Pierre Mouchon and the physicist Georges-Louis Le Sage, philanthropist, feminist, imperialist and writer. Key work: De la nécessité d'abolir la peine de mort (The necessity to abolish the death penalty).
- J. F. Oberlin (1740–1826), pastor, philanthropist and social reformer (French Lutheran).
- Robert Lewis Roumieu (1814–1877), British architect, governor of the Foundling Hospital, London; honorary architect and director of the French Hospital, co-founder of the Huguenot Society of which he was treasurer and later president.
- Magda Trocmé (1901–1996), laywoman, wife of André Trocmé, saviour of Jews in World War Two, anti-nuclear activist.
- Randolph Vigne (1928–2016), South African, President of the Huguenot Society of Great Britain, editor of its publications, director and treasurer of the French Hospital of London, Huguenot researcher and contributor to various publications on Huguenot history.

== Philosophers ==
- Charles Andler (1866–1934), philosopher, pacifist.
- Pierre Bayle (1647–1706), French philosopher.
- Jean Cavaillés, philosopher, pacifist.
- Jacques Maritain (1882–1973), philosopher from Protestant family, converted to Roman Catholicism, drafter of Universal Declaration of Human Rights.
- James Martineau (1805–1900), English philosopher, educator, Unitarian minister, descended from Gaston Martineau, a Huguenot surgeon and refugee.
- Paul Ricœur (1913–2005), philosopher and pacifist.
- Jean-Jacques Rousseau (1712–1778), Swiss writer, philosopher, social and educational theorist, descended from Huguenot wine merchant, Didier Rousseau, Jean-Jacques converted to an unorthodox form of Calvinism himself, rejecting original sin and some other key tenets of mainstream Calvinist faith.
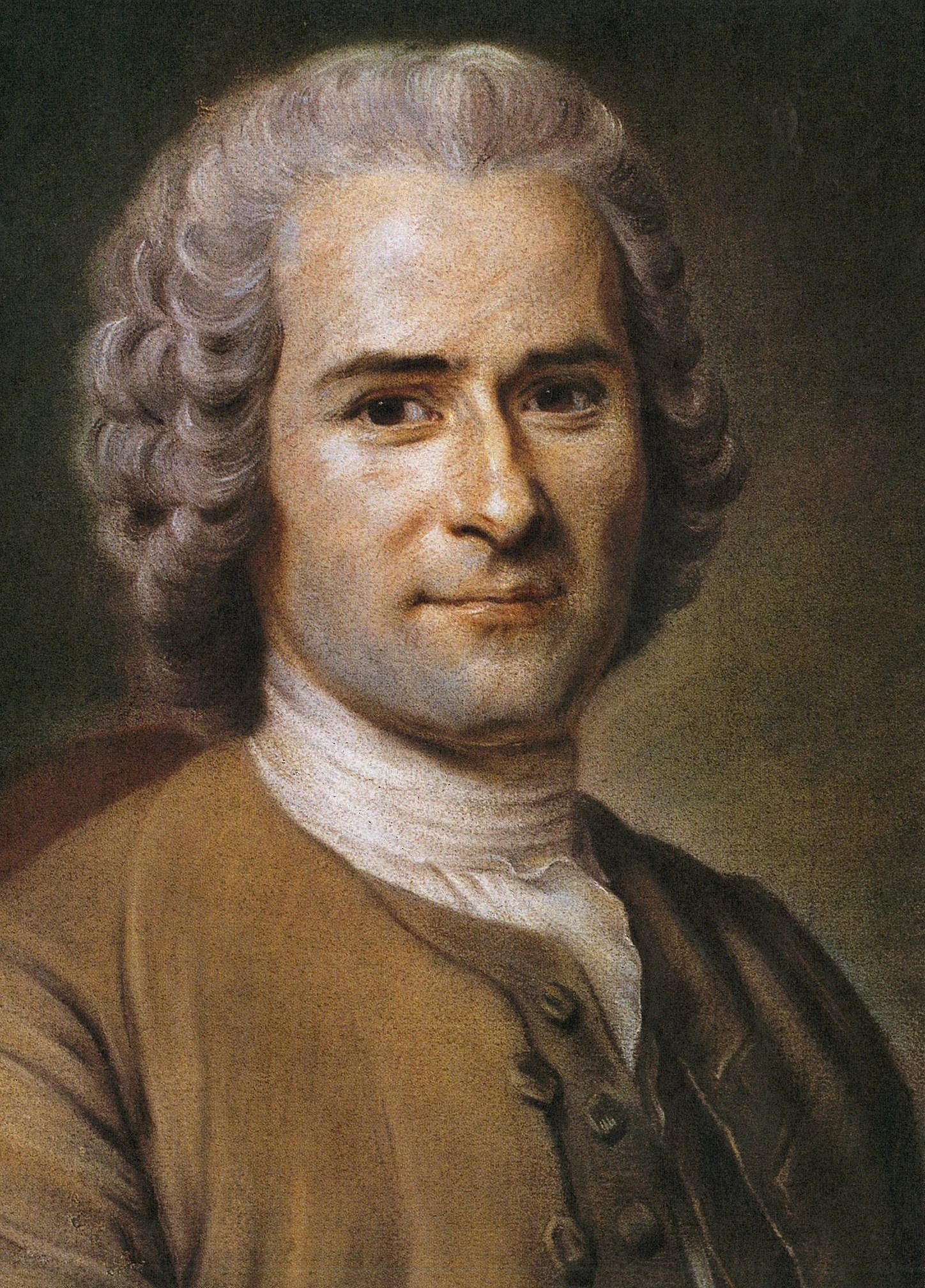
  Jean-Jacques Rousseau
- Théodore Eugène César Ruyssen (1868–1967), philosopher and pacifist, president of Peace Through Law.

== Pioneers and explorers ==
- Charles Bonney (1813–1897), Australian pioneer.
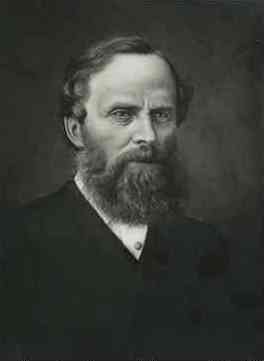
  Charles Bonney
- William Byrd I (1652–1704), early Virginia settler.
- Samuel de Champlain (1567–1635), French explorer, founded Québec City, born into a Huguenot family, died a Roman Catholic
- Guillaume Chartier, theologian, French Antarctique colonist.
- Louis Cordier (1777–1861), South African pioneer.
- Augustine Courtauld (1904–1959), British Arctic explorer.
- Davy Crockett (1786–1836), American folk hero and the descendant of one Monsieur de la Croquetagne, a captain in the Royal Guard of French King Louis XIV, whose family converted to Protestantism, fled France and settled in the north of Ireland.
- Philippe de Corguilleray, colonist, French Antarctique.
- Louis de Freycinet, French explorer.
- Louis Dubois (1626–1696), colonist to New Netherland, co-founded New Paltz, New York, ancestor of Hollywood actors Marlon Brando and Joan Crawford, from Artois.
- Pierre Du Gua, Sieur de Monts (1558–1628), French colonizer of Canada.
- Ralph Durand (1876–1945), explorer.
- Mareen Duvall (1625–1694), early Maryland settler originally from Nantes, ancestor of Wallis Simpson and actor Robert Duvall.
- Tobias Furneaux (1735–1781), British explorer, charted coastal areas of Tasmania.
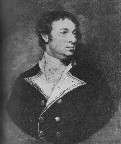
  Tobias Furneaux
- René Goulaine de Laudonnière (1529–1574), French explorer.
- Jean de Léry (1536–1613), pastor and explorer of Brazil. Key work: History of a voyage to the land of Brazil (1578).
- Meriwether Lewis (1774–1809), American explorer.
- Charles Marais, South African pioneer.
- Nicolas Martiau (1591–1657), American pioneer.
- Jacques Mouton, South African pioneer.
- Daniel Perrin (1642–1719), one of the first permanent European inhabitants of Staten Island, New York originally from Normandy, ancestor of American actress Valerie Perrine.
- Pierre Richier (1506–1580), pastor, French Antarctique colonist, later took lead role in turning La Rochelle into a leading Huguenot centre.
- Abraham Salle (1670–1719), immigrant and American colonist.
- Aaron Sherritt, Anglo-Irish Protestant of Huguenot descent, anti-Catholic, Australian colonial pioneer, victim of police manipulation, murder victim (Kelly Gang).
- Jedediah Smith, American explorer, mountain man
- Pierre de Villiers, South African pioneer.

== Politicians ==
- Thomas Henry Barclay, American Loyalist during the American Revolutionary War and pre-Confederation Nova Scotian politician.
- Antoine Barnave (1761–1783), French revolutionary, tried to establish a French constitutional monarchy, member of the Feuillants.
- Isaac Barré, British politician, gave his name to Wilkes-Barre, Pennsylvania; Barre, Massachusetts; and Barre, Vermont.
- Ruth Bascom, American politician, mayor of Eugene, Oregon.
- Paul Bastide, politician, former member of the Constitutional Council.
- James A. Bayard, US Congressman.
- John M. Berrien, United States senator from Georgia and Andrew Jackson's Attorney General.
- Christian Blanc (1942–), centre-right politician (UDF Party), prefect.
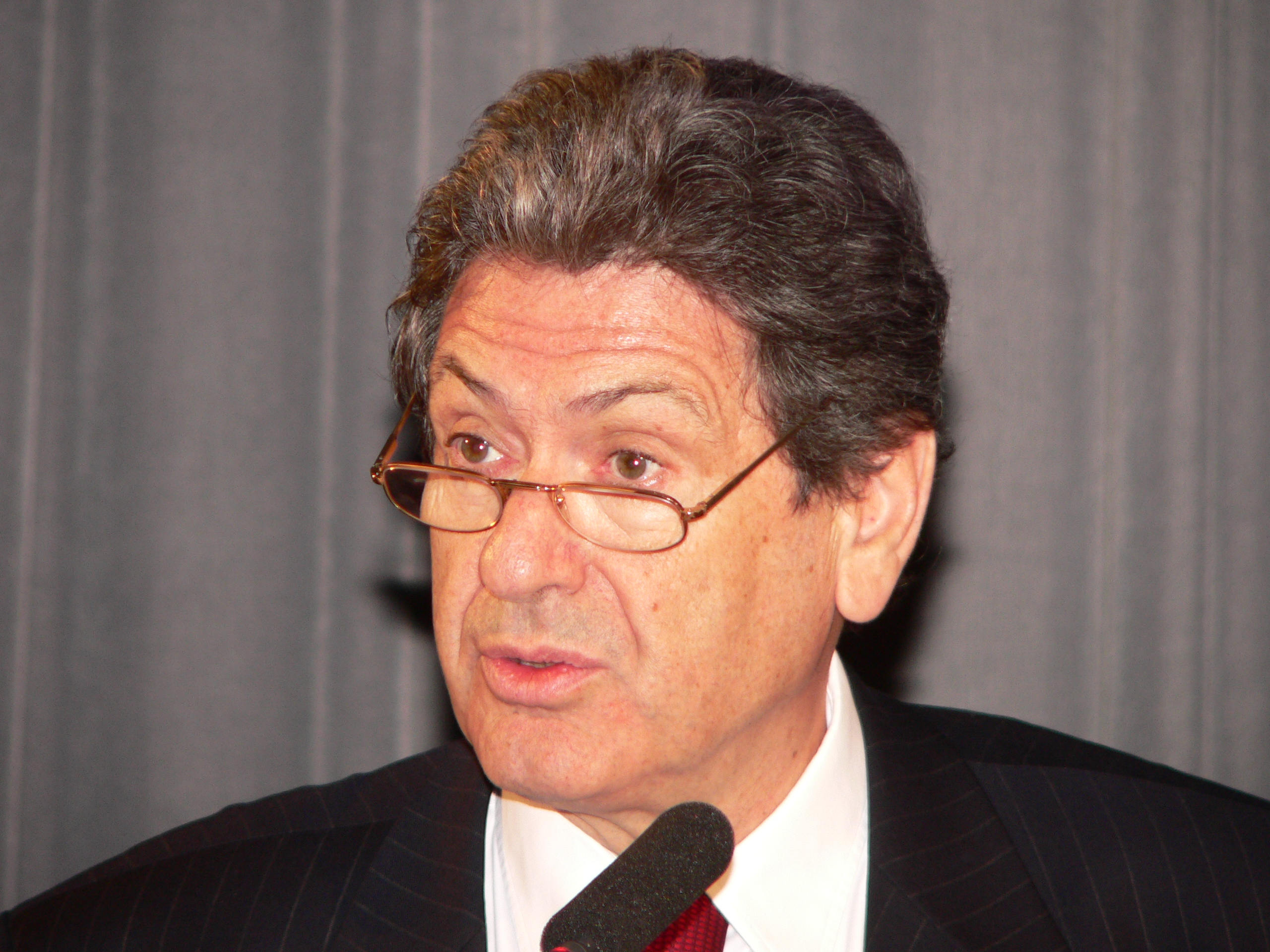
  Christian Blanc
- Alain Bombard (1924–2005), Socialist Party politician.
- Charles Bosanquet (1769–1850), merchant, colonial official, governor, son of Samuel Bosanquet.
- Jacob Bosanquet (1755–1828), English politician, opponent of Napoleon Bonaparte, grandson of David Bosanquet who had taken refuge from Languedoc.
- Jessie Boucherett, English campaigner for women's rights.
- Elias Boudinot (1740–1821), president of the American Continental Congress, descended from the Boudinot family of Marans, Aunis, France.
- James Bowdoin, Governor of Massachusetts.
- James Bowdoin III, American statesman, philanthropist, benefactor of Bowdoin College.
- Bryant Butler Brooks, Governor of Wyoming.
- Jean Bude, councillor, Household of the King.
- Marie Byles (1900–1979), Australian environmentalist, feminist and Buddhist, solicitor, descended from the Beuzeville family of Normandy.
- Pierre-Joseph Cambon (1756–1820), French revolutionary, opponent of Robespierre, advocate of the separation of church and state, member of the Feuillants.
- François Caron (1600–1673), French Director-General of the Dutch East India Company and the French East Indies Company.
- Victor Cazalet (1896–1943), British Conservative Party politician, supporter of Zionism, grandson of Edward Cazalet, godson of Queen Victoria, Huguenot ancestors were from Languedoc.
- Winston Churchill (1874–1965), British prime minister, descendant of Timothy Chauncey Jerome.
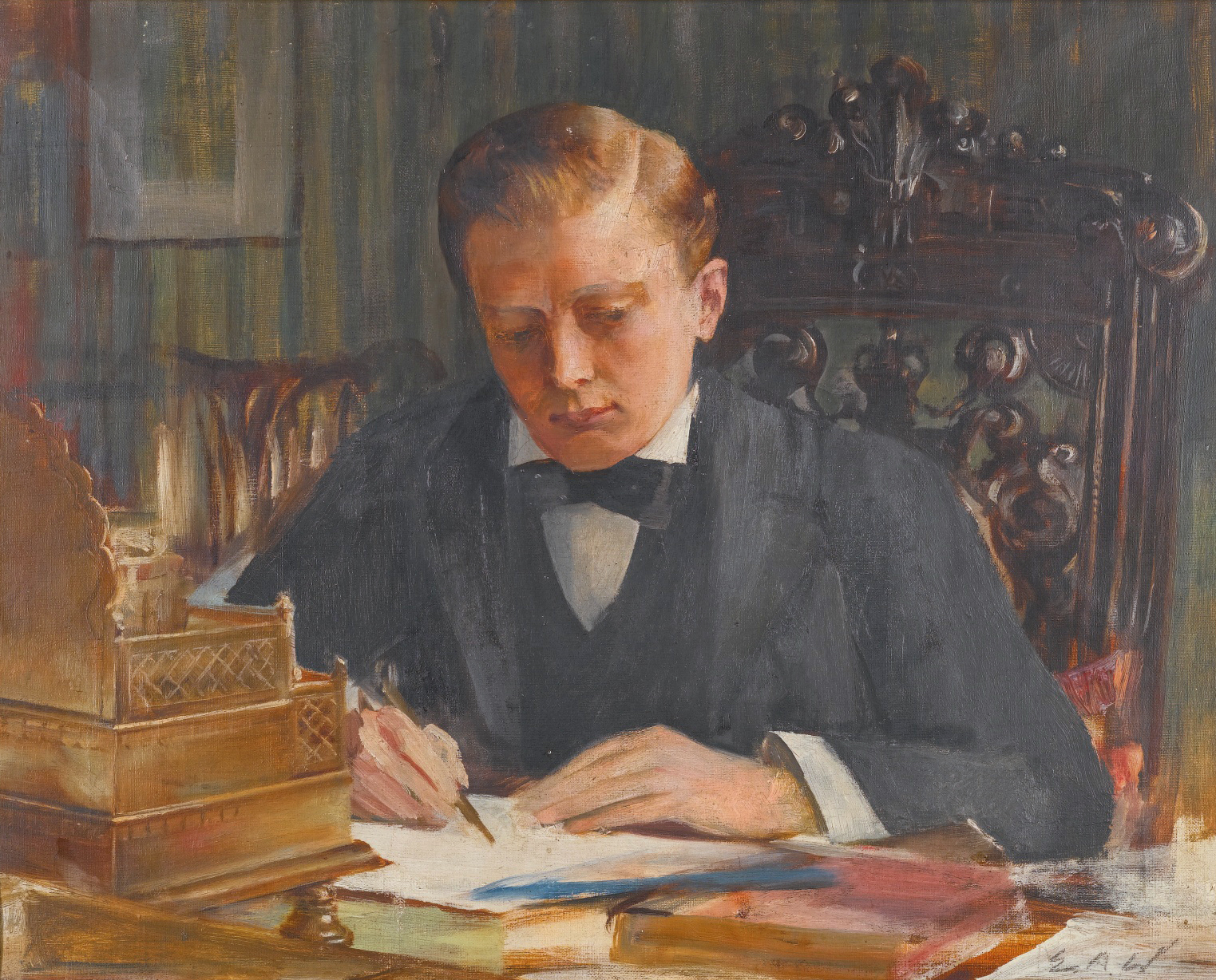
  Winston Churchill
- Sarel Cilliers, Boer Voortrekker.
- Georges Clemenceau (1841–1929), centrist politician, French prime minister, mother was a Huguenot descendant.
- Jean-Pierre Cot (1937–), Socialist Party politician.
- François Boissy d'Anglas (1756–1826), French revolutionary.
- Richard Walther Darré (1895–1953), NSDAP Reich Agricultural Minister.
- Gaston Defferre (1910–1986), Socialist Party politician, mayor of Marseille.
- Charles de Freycinet, French statesman.
- Thomas-Augustin de Gasparin (1754–1793), French revolutionary.
- Frederik Willem de Klerk (1936–2021), President of the Republic of South Africa, September 1989 – May 1994, Nobel Prize laureate.
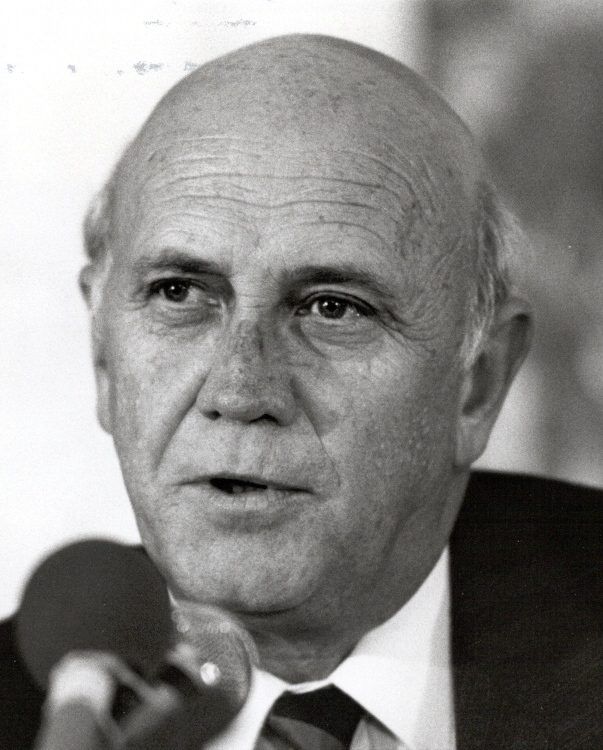
  Frederik Willem de Klerk
- James DeLancey, Governor of New York.
- Jean-François de la Roque de Roberval (1495–1560), first lieutenant governor of French Canada.
- Marie de La Tour d'Auvergne (1601–1665), French noblewoman.
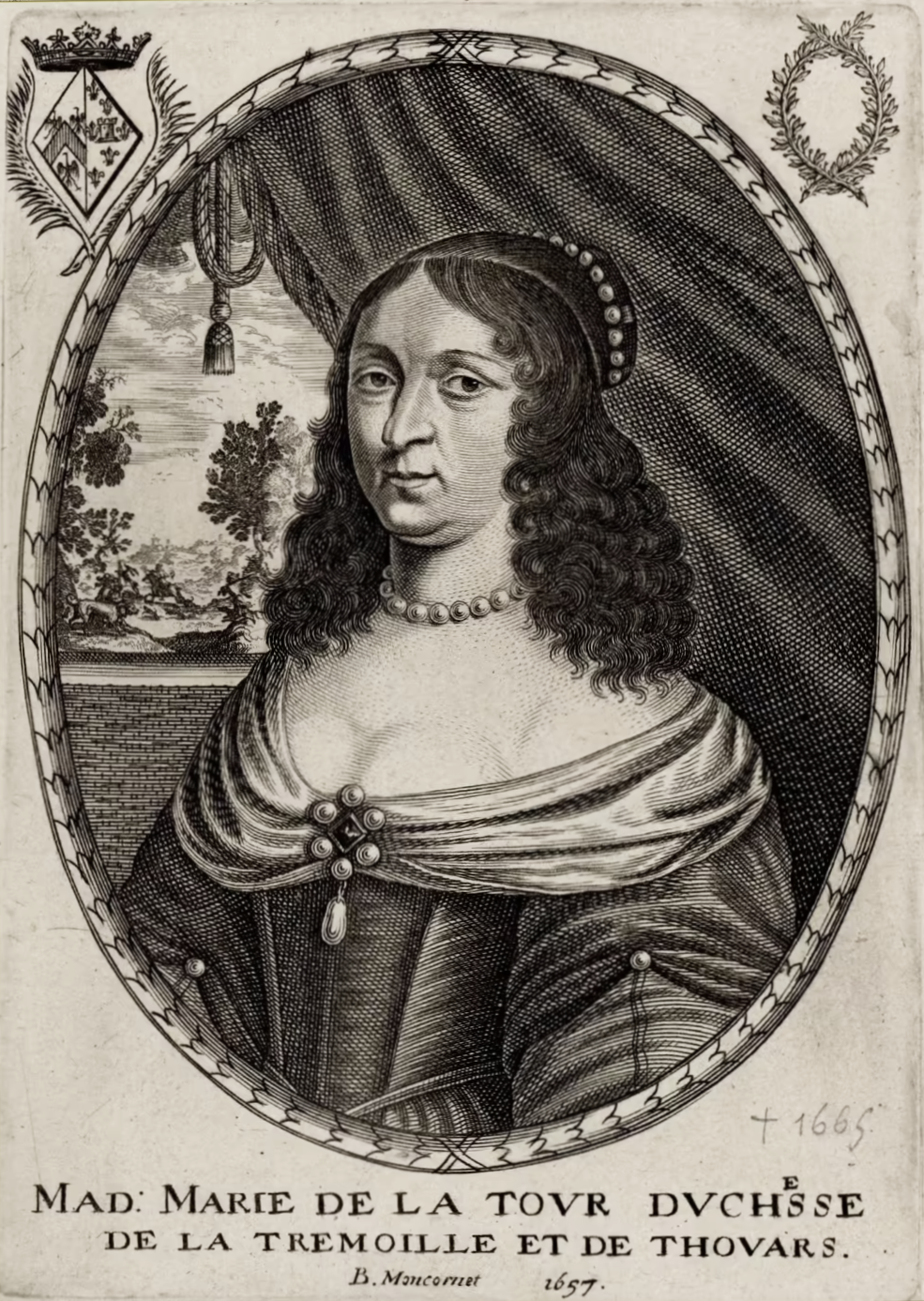
  Marie de La Tour d'Auvergne
- Gabriel de Lorges comte de Montgomery, French nobleman, responsible for accidental death of King Henri II.
- Lothar de Maizière (1940–), German Christian Democrat politician.
- Thomas de Maizière (1954–), German Christian Democrat politician, cousin of Lothar de Maizière.
- Maurice Couve de Murville (1907–1999), right-wing (UDR party), French Prime Minister.
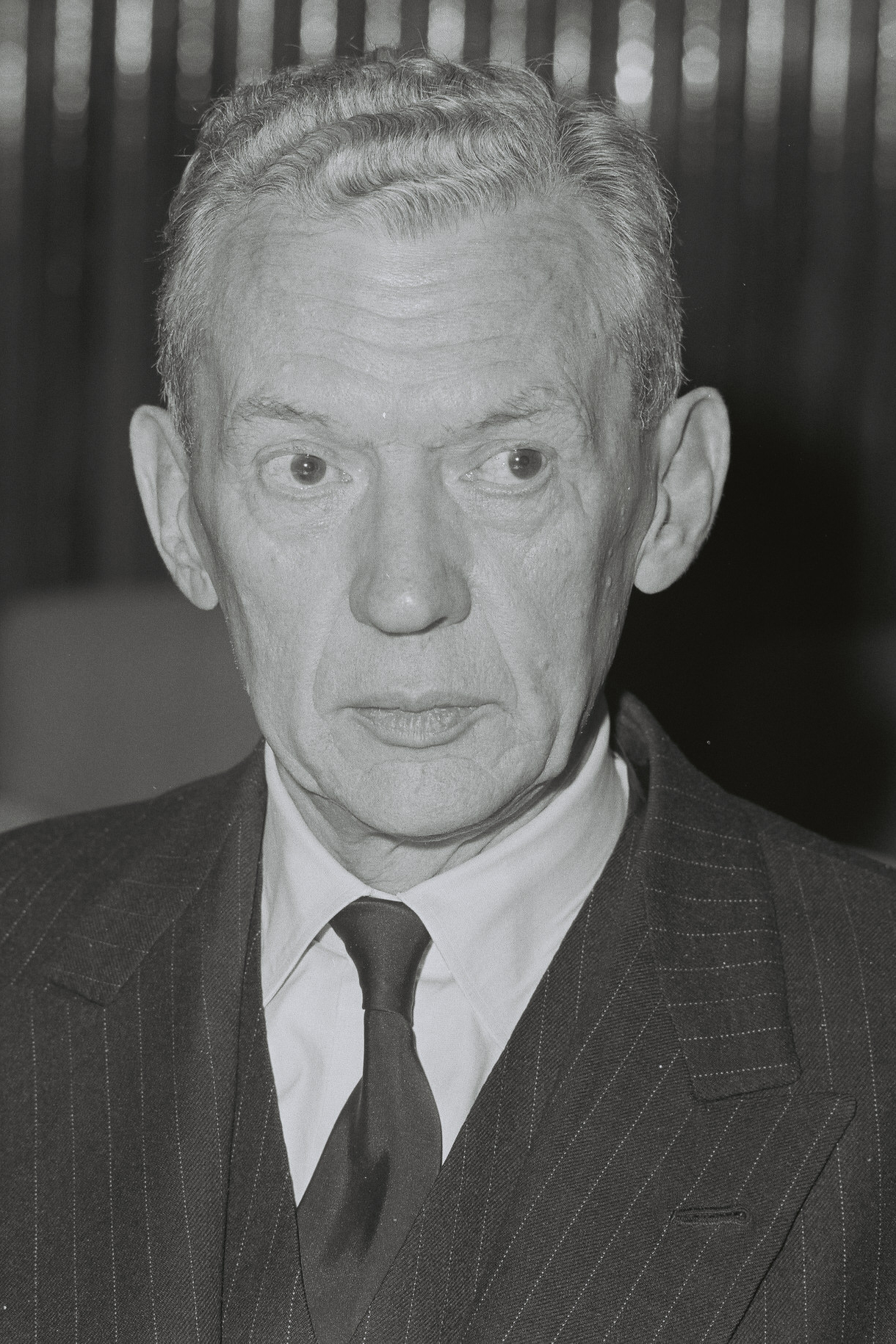
  Maurice Couve de Murville
- Francis de Pressensé (1853–1914), one of the founders and first president of the Human Rights League, Dreyfus supporter.
- Isaac De Riemer (1675–1739), Mayor of New York City.
- Georgina Dufoix (1942–), Socialist Party politician.
- Clifford Dupont (1905–1978), the first president of Rhodesia, 1970–1976.
- Pierre Samuel du Pont de Nemours (1739–1817), French writer, economist, government official.
- Du Pré Alexander, 2nd Earl of Caledon, Governor of the Cape of Good Hope, 1806–1811
- D. F. du Toit, co-founder of Afrikaans language movement Society of Real Afrikaners.
- S. G. du Toit, co-founder of Afrikaans language movement Society of Real Afrikaners.
- Stephanus Jacobus du Toit (1847–1911), co-founder of Afrikaans language movement Society of Real Afrikaners.
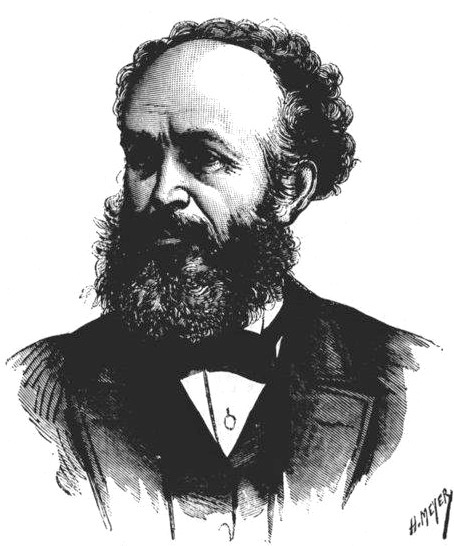
  Stephanus Jacobus du Toit
- Friedrich Engels (1820–1895), Marxist, possibly descended from a Huguenot named L'Ange, Engels was raised as a Calvinist before exploring pandeism and then becoming an atheist.
- Nigel Farage (1964–), British politician, former leader of UKIP.
- Geoffrey FitzClarence, British Conservative politician.
- Peter Force (1790–1868), American politician, archivist.
- Gerald Ford, President of the United States (Republican Party).
- Jacobus Johannes Fouché (1898–1980), President of South Africa.
- Alonzo Garcelon, Governor of Maine.
- Innocent Gentillet (1535–1588), politician and lawyer, opponent of Machiavellianism. Key work: Anti-Machiavelli.
- Marie Goegg (1826–1899), pacifist.
- Al Gore, former vice-president of the United States, environmentalist.
- Hermann Göring, German politician, military leader, leading member of the NSDAP.
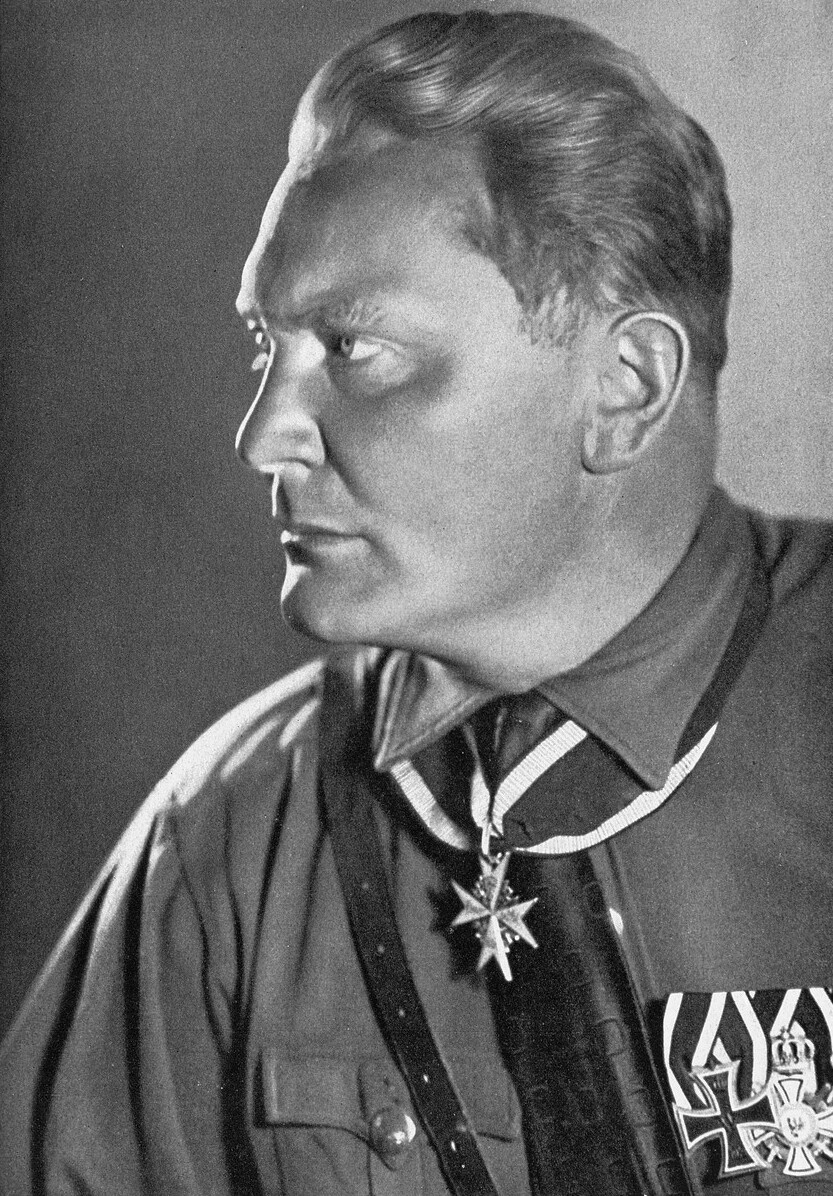
  Hermann Göring
- Pierre-Paul Guieysse (1841–1914), French Minister of the Colonies, pacifist.
- Alexander Hamilton (1755–1804), American Secretary of the Treasury, mother was a Huguenot refugee living in the West Indies.
- Georges-Eugène Haussmann (1809–1891), politician, redesigned Paris (French Lutheran).
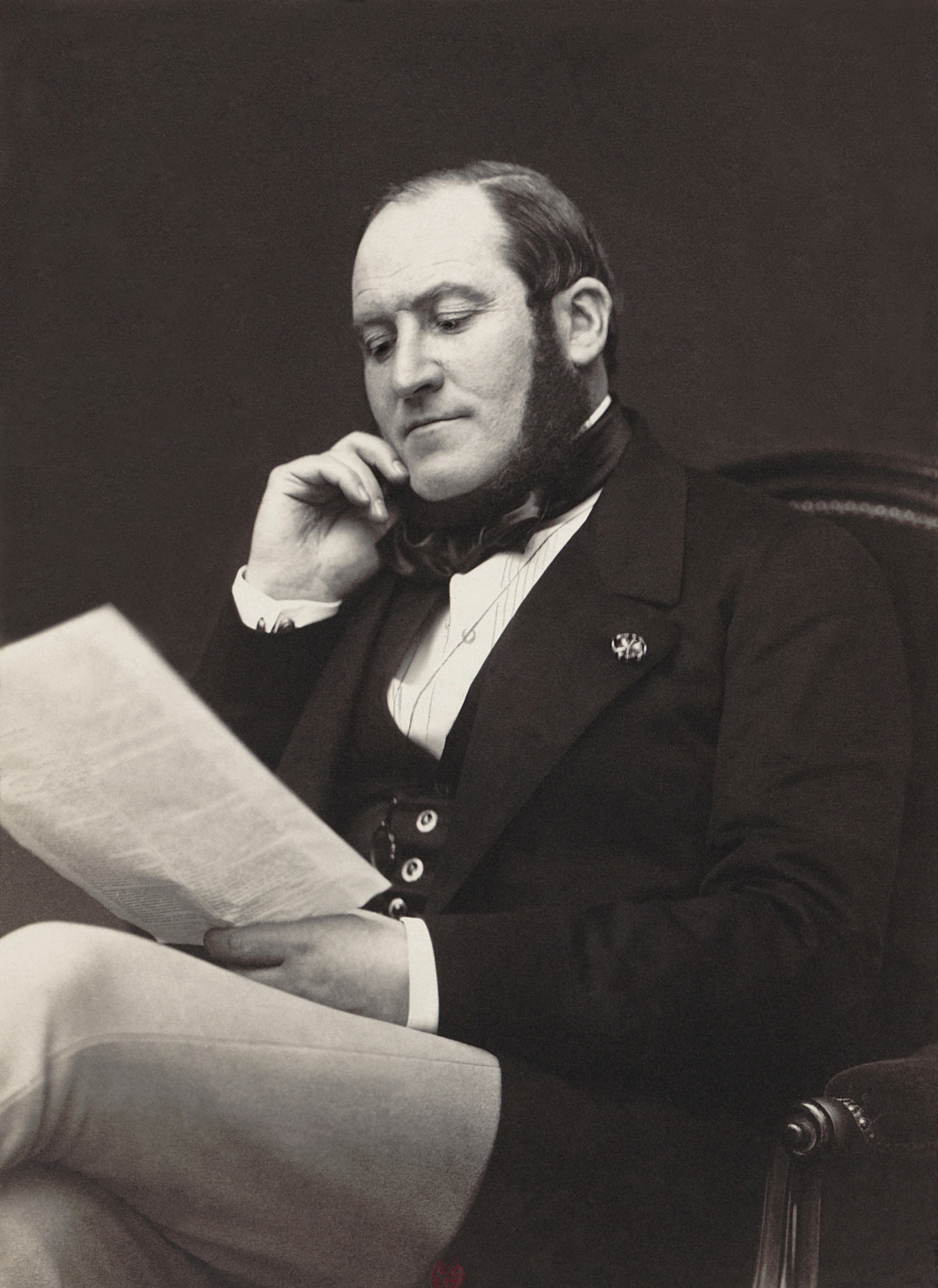
  Georges-Eugène Haussmann
- James Francis Helvetius Hobler, Chief Clerk to the Lord Mayors of London.
- Sir James Houblon, merchant, Member of Parliament.
- Sir John Houblon, First Governor of the Bank of England.
- Jules Humbert-Droz (1891–1971), pastor, secretary of the Communist International.
- George Izard, Major General and Governor of Arkansas.
- Ralph Izard, US Senator, President pro tempore of US Senate
- Lyndon B. Johnson (1908–1973), President of the United States (Democrat Party)>.
- Lionel Jospin (1937–), Socialist Party politician, French prime minister.
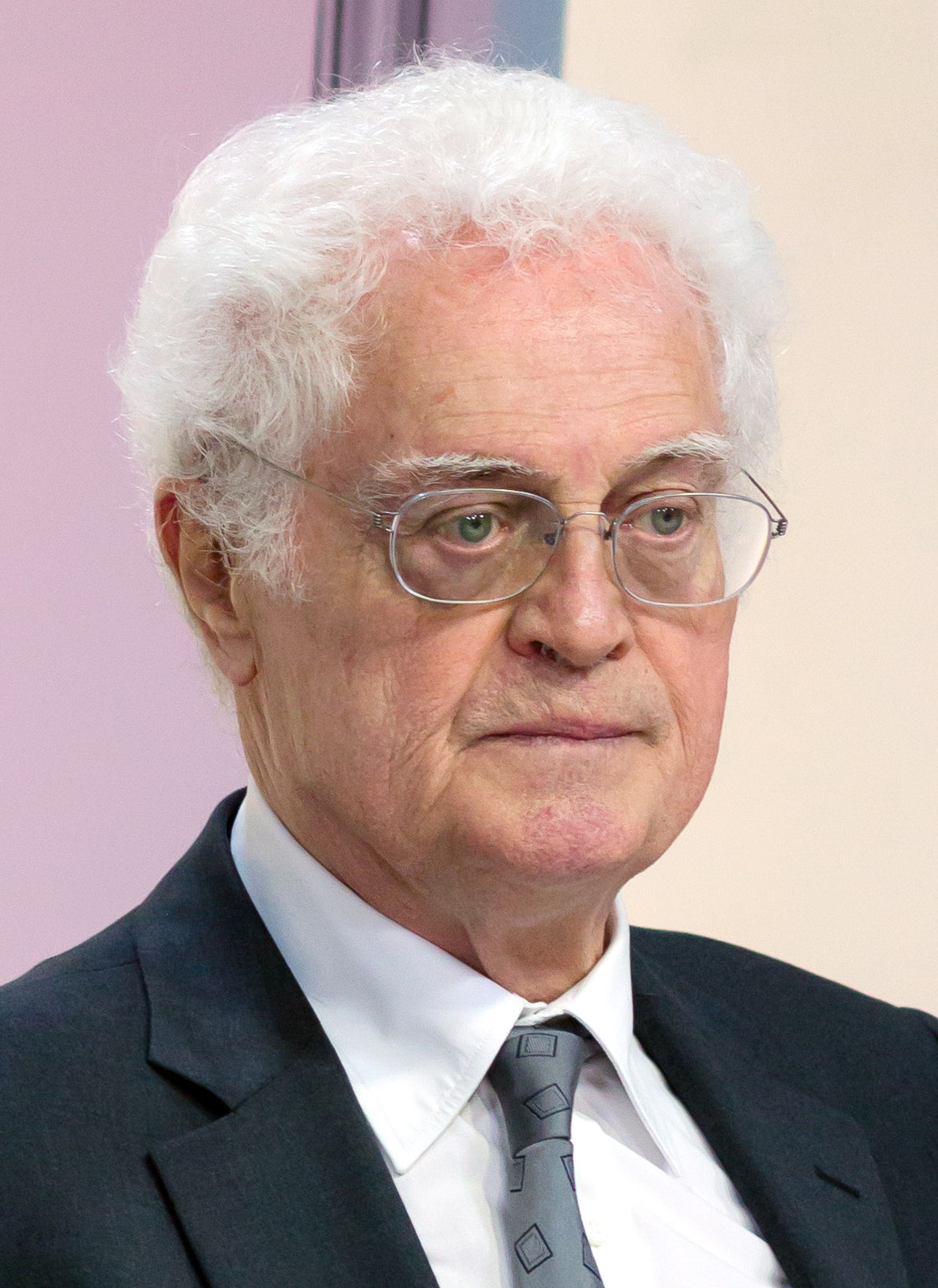
  Lionel Jospin
- Pierre Joxe (1934–), Socialist Party politician, Minister for the Interior and for Religion.
- Julien of Toulouse (1750–1828), French revolutionary, pastor.
- Jacques Lafleur (1932–2010), leader of the Caledonian Right.
- Robert M. La Follette (1855–1925), Senator from Wisconsin, co-founder of the Progressive Party.
- Catherine Lalumière (1935–), Socialist Party politician.
- Hubert Languet (1518–1581), French diplomat and reformer.
- Charles La Trobe (1801–1875), first lieutenant-governor of the state of Victoria, Australia, descendant of Jean Latrobe, linen weaver from Montauban, formerly in Languedoc, who fled to Ireland.
- Henry Laurens (1724–1792), president of the American Continental Congress.
- Charles Peter Layard (1806–1893), first mayor of Colombo.
- John Henry Lefroy (1817–1890), Governor of Tasmania, cousin of Thomas Langlois Lefroy.
- Thomas Langlois Lefroy (1776–1869), Irish politician and judge, suitor of Jane Austen, opponent of Irish Catholic emancipation, ancestors from Cambrai.
- Ezra L'Hommedieu (1734–1811), American statesman.
- Daniel François Malan (1874–1959), South African Prime Minister, elected on Apartheid platform, descendant of Jacques Malan from Provence.
- Gideon Malherbe, co-founder of an Afrikaans language movement named the Society of Real Afrikaners.
- Jean-Paul Marat (1743–1793), physician, French revolutionary, journalist, deist, father was a Protestant.
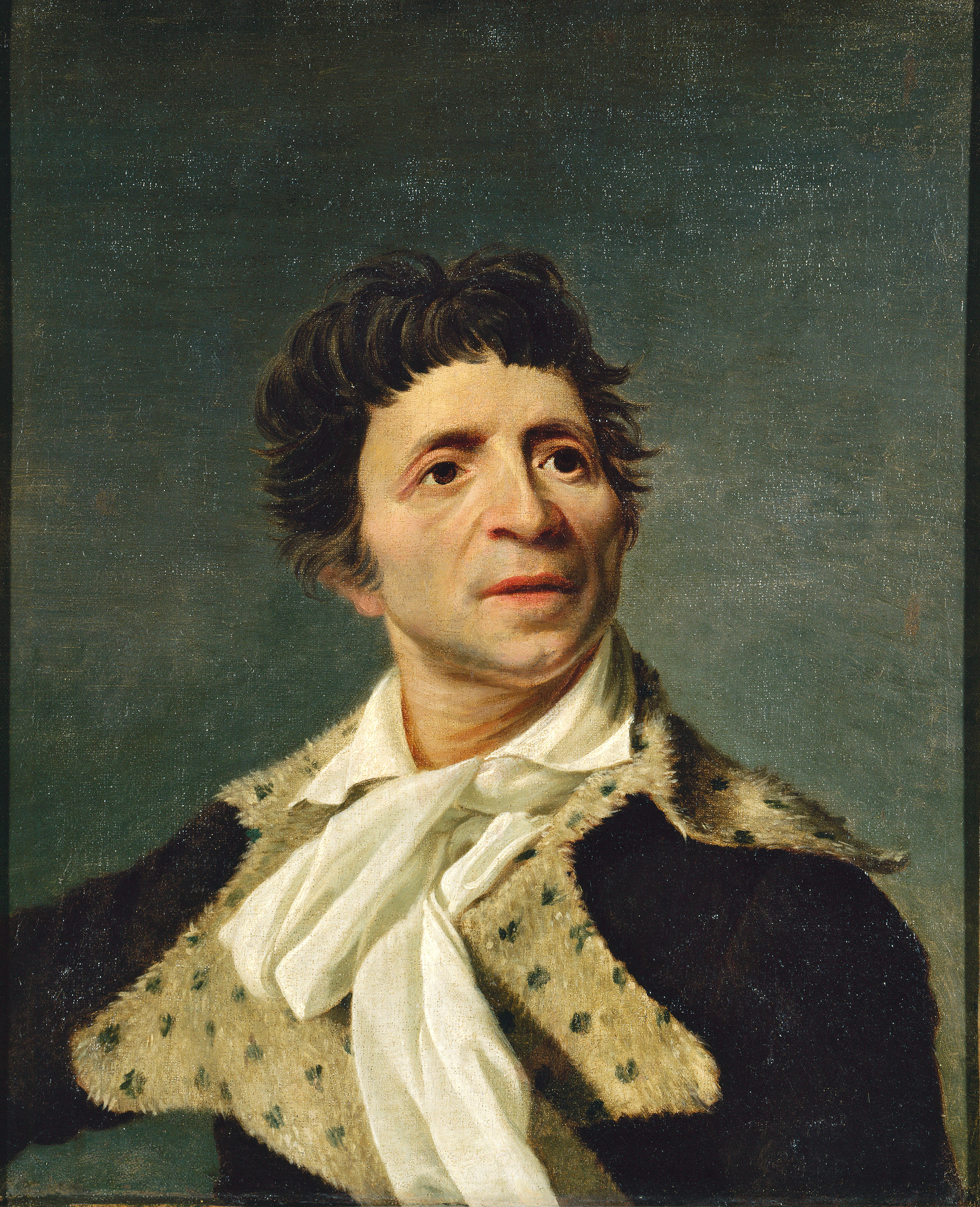
  Jean-Paul Marat
- Jan Masaryk, Czech diplomat and politician, descended from Garrigue family.
- Louis Mermaz (1931–), Socialist Party politician, President of the National Assembly under Mitterrand.
- Gabriel Minvielle, French-born early mayor of New York.
- Robert Morier (1826–1893), British diplomat.
- Gouverneur Morris, American statesman, represented Pennsylvania in the Constitutional Convention.
- Jozua "Tom" Naudé (1889–1969), acting President of South Africa from 1967 to 1968.
- Hilbrand Nawijn (1948–), Dutch politician and lawyer.
- Jacques Necker (1732–1804), finance minister.
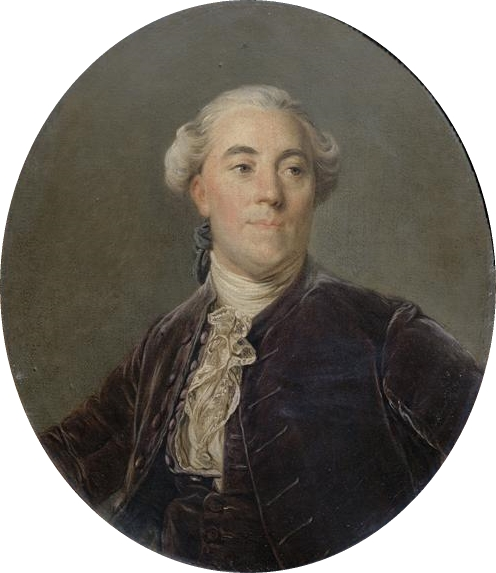
  Jacques Necker
- Barack Obama, American president, descendant of Mareen Duvall.
- Sarah Palin, American politician, Governor of Alaska, US vice presidential candidate.
- Philip Oxenden Papillon (1826–1899), British politician.
- George Poindexter, US Congressman.
- Pierre Poujade (1920–2003), populist politician, small business spokesman.
- Archibald Primrose, 5th Earl of Rosebery (1847–1929), British Liberal Party prime minister.
- David Provoost (1611–1656), Head of the Nine Men in New Amsterdam 1652, Notary Public, first sheriff of Breukelen (Brooklyn), counselor and attorney, descended from Prévost family.
- Nicole Questiaux (1930–), Socialist Party politician.
- Jacques Antoine Rabaut-Pommier (1744–1820), Girondist, French revolutionary, pastor, supporter of Napoleon Bonaparte, vaccination advocate, brother of Jean-Paul Rabaut Saint-Étienne.
- Jean-Paul Rabaut Saint-Étienne (1743–1793), Girondist, French revolutionary, pastor, obtained formal recognition of Protestant civil rights from Louis XVI, son of Pastor Paul Rabaut.
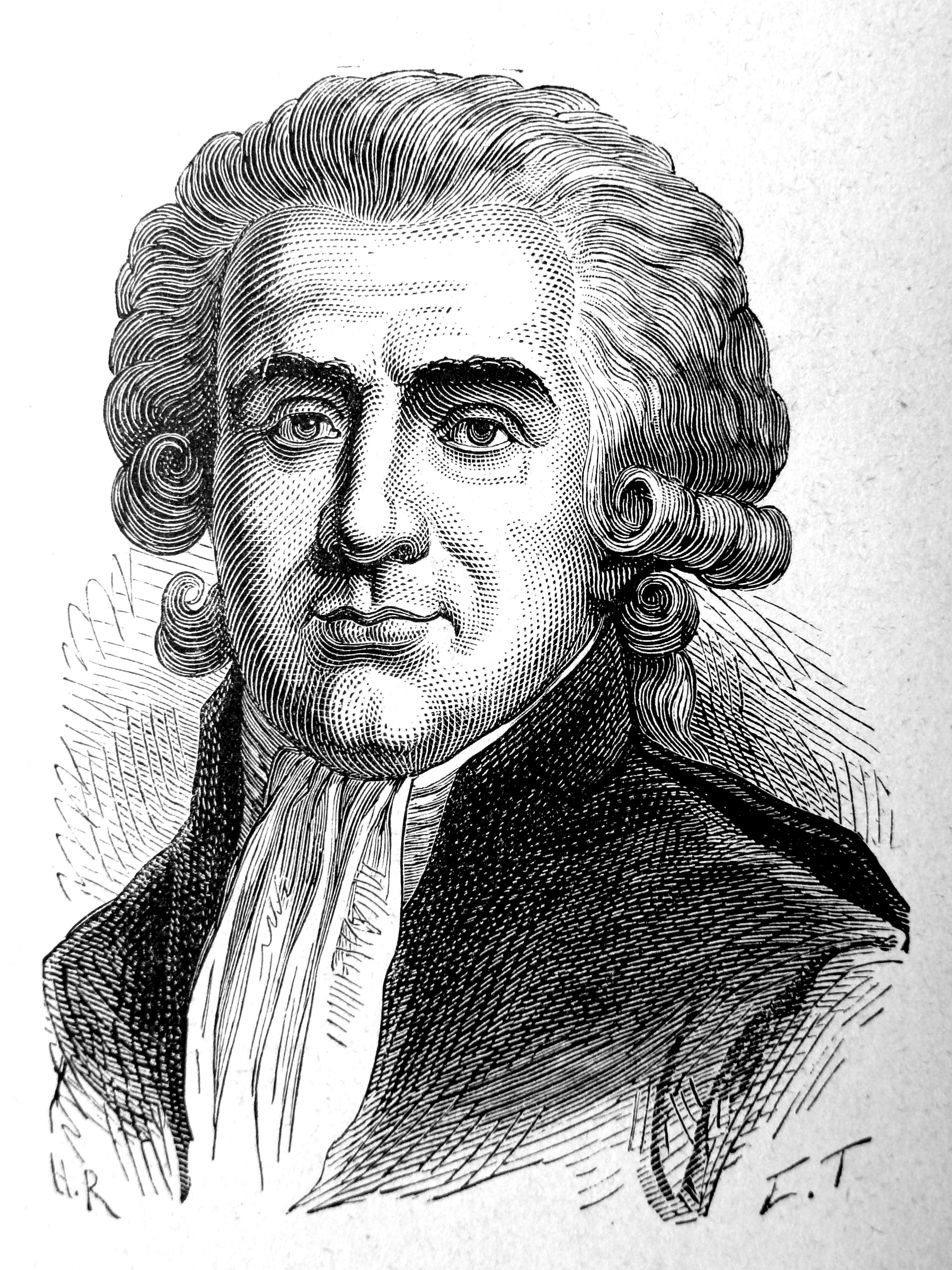
  Jean-Paul Rabaut Saint-Étienne
- Timothy Raison, MP for Aylesbury and member of the Thatcher Government.
- Piet Retief, Boer Voortrekker.
- Daniel Roberdeau, Congressman, militia general.
- Michel Rocard (1930–2016), Socialist Party prime minister, Protestant descendant on his mother's side.
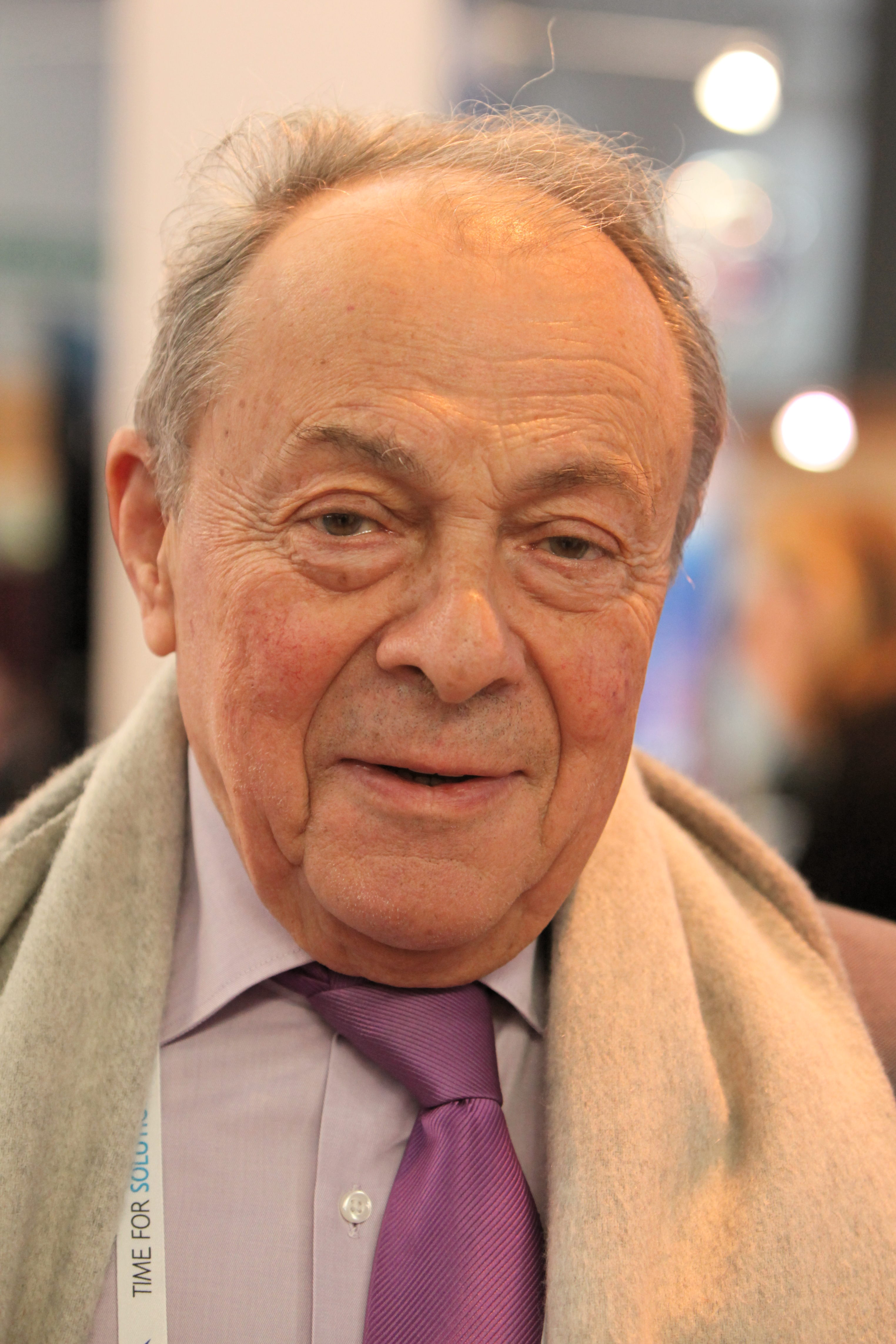
  Michel Rocard
- Esmond Romilly, British socialist, anti-fascist
- Samuel Romilly (1757–1818), English legal reformer, Member of Parliament, whose family came from Montpellier.
- Franklin D. Roosevelt, 32nd President of the United States, descendant of Philippe de La Noye.
- Sara Roosevelt, mother of Franklin D. Roosevelt, descendant of Philippe de La Noye.
- Theodore Roosevelt, President of the United States (Republican Party).
- Theodore Runyon, American lawyer, politician, Civil War general, New Jersey court judge, first US ambassador to Germany.
- William Nelson Runyon, American lawyer, politician, Governor of New Jersey.
- Jeanbon Saint-André (1749–1813), French revolutionary politician and pastor, Jacobin, member of the Committee for Public Safety.
- Thilo Sarrazin, German economist, formerly politician and member of the executive board of the Deutsche Bundesbank.
- Christian Sautter (1940–), Socialist Party politician, General Secretary under Mitterrand, son of a pastor.
- Joseph Savory (1843–1921), Lord Mayor of London.
- Auguste Scheurer-Kestner (1833–1899), French Republican political leader and Dreyfus supporter, chemist, industrialist and politician. A republican, he was opposed to the empire of Napoleon III.
- John Sevier, first governor of Tennessee.
- Julie Siegfried (1848–1922), political activist.
- Jacques Soustelle (1912–1990), politician, supporter of "French Algeria", ethnologist.
- Sir John Stokes (1917–2003), British Conservative Party politician.
- William Taft, President of the United States (REpublican Party).
- Eugène Terre'Blanche (1941–2010), South African nationalist political activist.
- Charles Tupper (1821–1915), Canadian father of Confederation, Premier of Nova Scotia (1864–1867), 7th Prime Minister of Canada (1896) was reputed to be a Huguenot descendant.
- Robert Vernon, 1st Baron Lyveden (1800–1873), was a British Whig and then Liberal Party politician and nephew of Sydney Smith.
- Jean-Henri Voulland (1751–1801), French revolutionary, member of the Committee of General Security, opponent of Robespierre and the Committee of Public Safety, involved in the overthrow of Robespierre.
- George Washington (1732–1799), American revolutionary and the first President of the United States, descendant of Nicholas Martiau.
- Jean Zay (1904–1944), French anti-fascist politician.

== Printers and booksellers ==
- Conrad Badius (1462–1535), printer.
- Henri Estienne (1528–1598), printer, son of Robert Estienne and father-in-law of Isaac Causabon.
- Robert Estienne (1503–1559), Genevan printer.
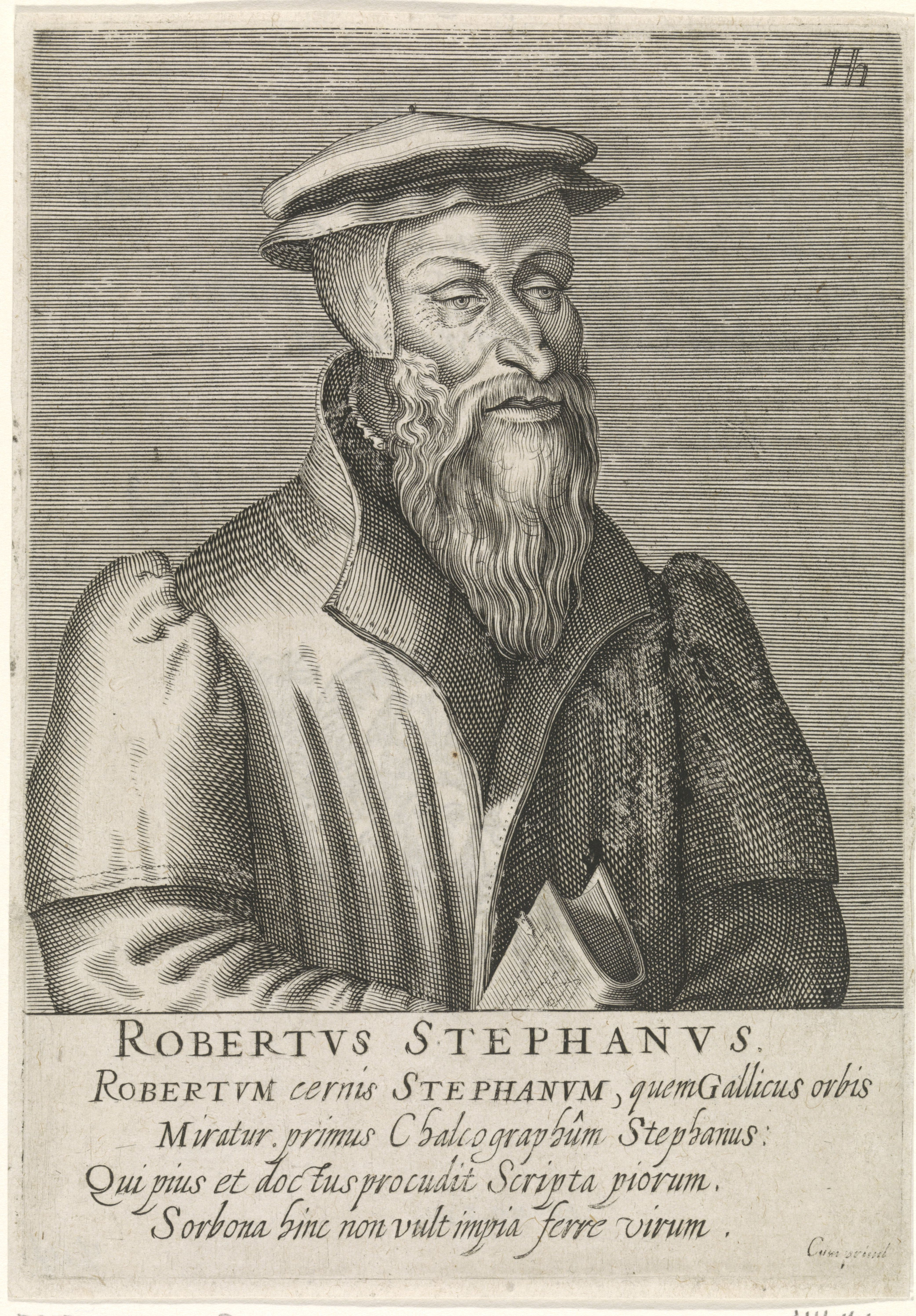
  Robert Estienne
- Thomas Vautrollier (died 1587), printer.

== Privateers ==
- Nicolas Brigaut (1653–1686), privateer.
- William II de La Marck (1542–1578), privateer.
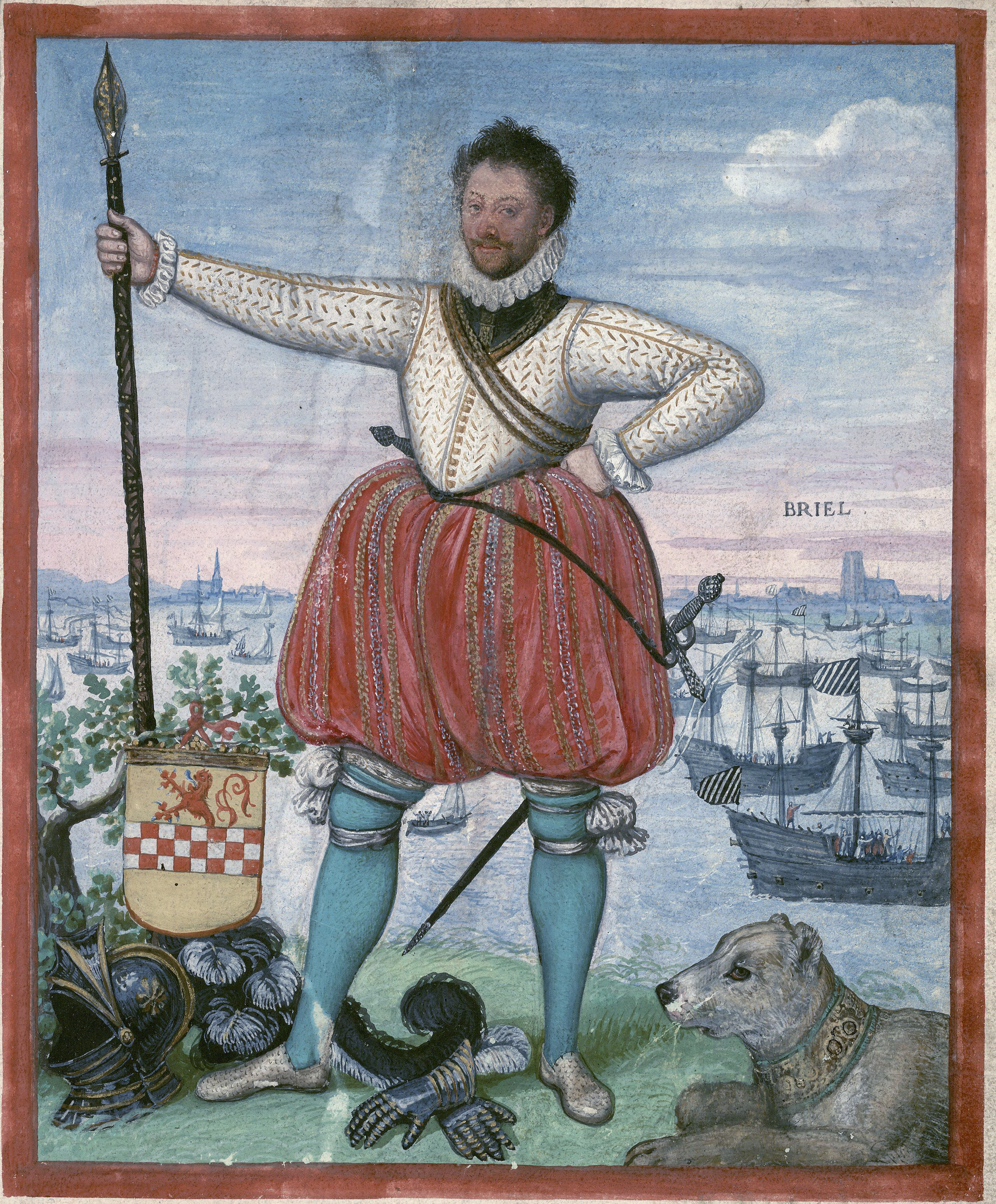
  William II de La Marck
- Jacques de Sores ("The Exterminating Angel"), privateer.
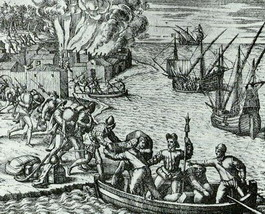
  Jacques de Sores
- Jean-Baptiste du Casse (1646–1715), privateer, son of Pastor Gaillard Ducasse.
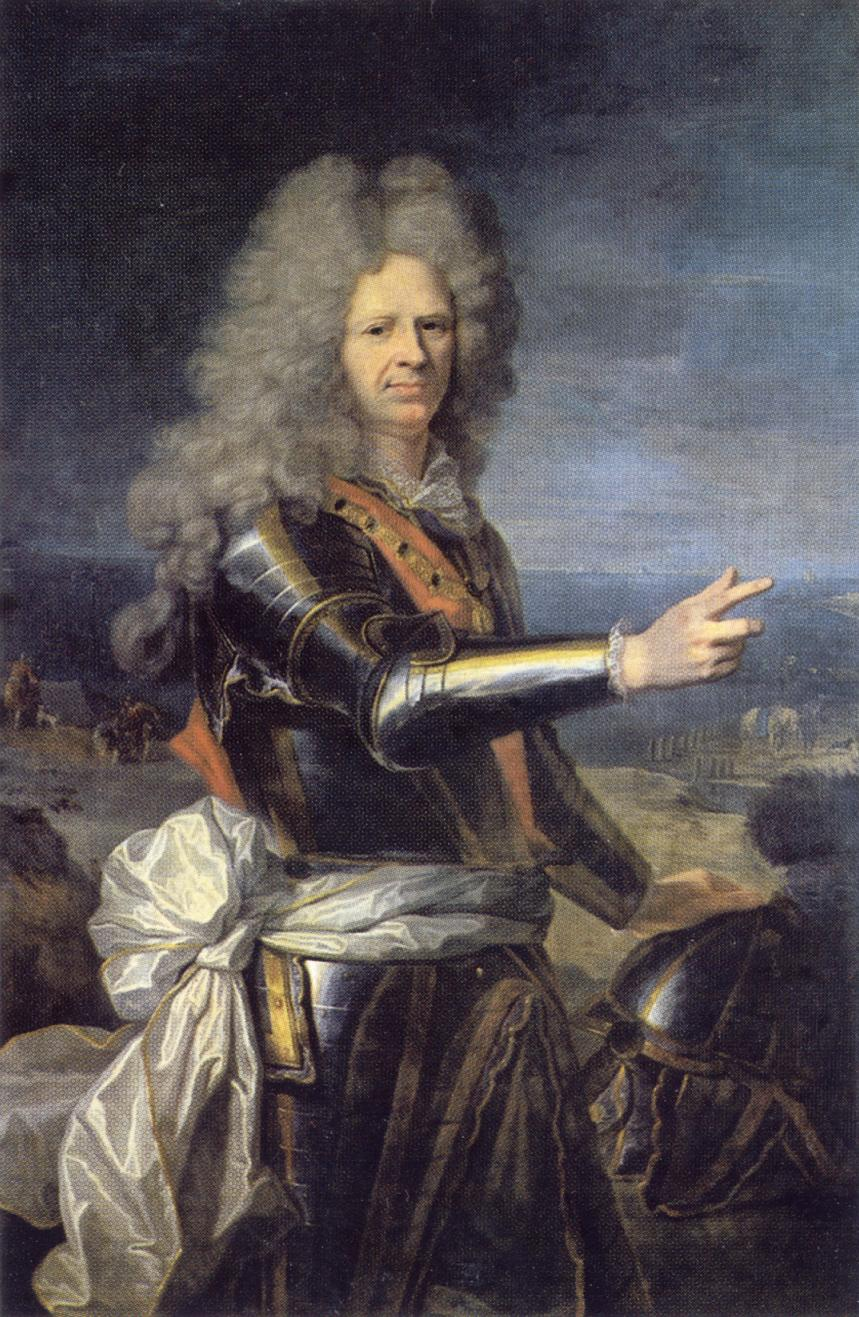
  Jean-Baptiste du Casse
- Alexandre Olivier Exquemelin (1645–1707), privateer, historian.
- Jean Fleury (died 1527), privateer.
- François le Clerc known as Jambe de Bois (or Wooden Leg) (died 1563), privateer.
- Guillaume Le Testu, privateer.

== Royalty ==
- Catherine, Princess of Wales (1982–), one line of her family is descended from the Martineaus.
- Catherine of Bourbon (1559–1604), Navarrese regent princess and writer of sonnets, daughter of Queen Jeanne d'Albret and sister of King Henri IV of France.
- Constant d'Aubigné (1585–1647), French nobleman, son of Agrippa d'Aubigné, father of Madame de Maintenon, second wife of Louis XIV, convert to Roman Catholicism, convicted counterfeiter.
- Charles III (1948–), British monarch, descended from the Bourbon Montpensier, Coligny, d'Olbreuse, Rohan and Ruvigny families.
- Diana, Princess of Wales (1961–1997), descended from the Bourbon Vendome, Bulteel, Guinand, Navarre, Rochefoucauld, Ruvigny, Schomberg, and Thellusson families.
- Elizabeth II (1926–2022), British monarch, descended from the Bourbon Montpensier, Coligny, d'Olbreuse, Rohan and Ruvigny families.
- Francis, Duke of Anjou, suitor of Elizabeth I of England, French heir, Huguenot sympathiser but not a convert.
- Frederick the Great of Prussia (1712–1786), son of Sophia Dorothea of Hanover and nephew of George II of Great Britain was matrilineally descended from Alexander II d'Esmiers, Marquis d'Olbreuse, a Huguenot.
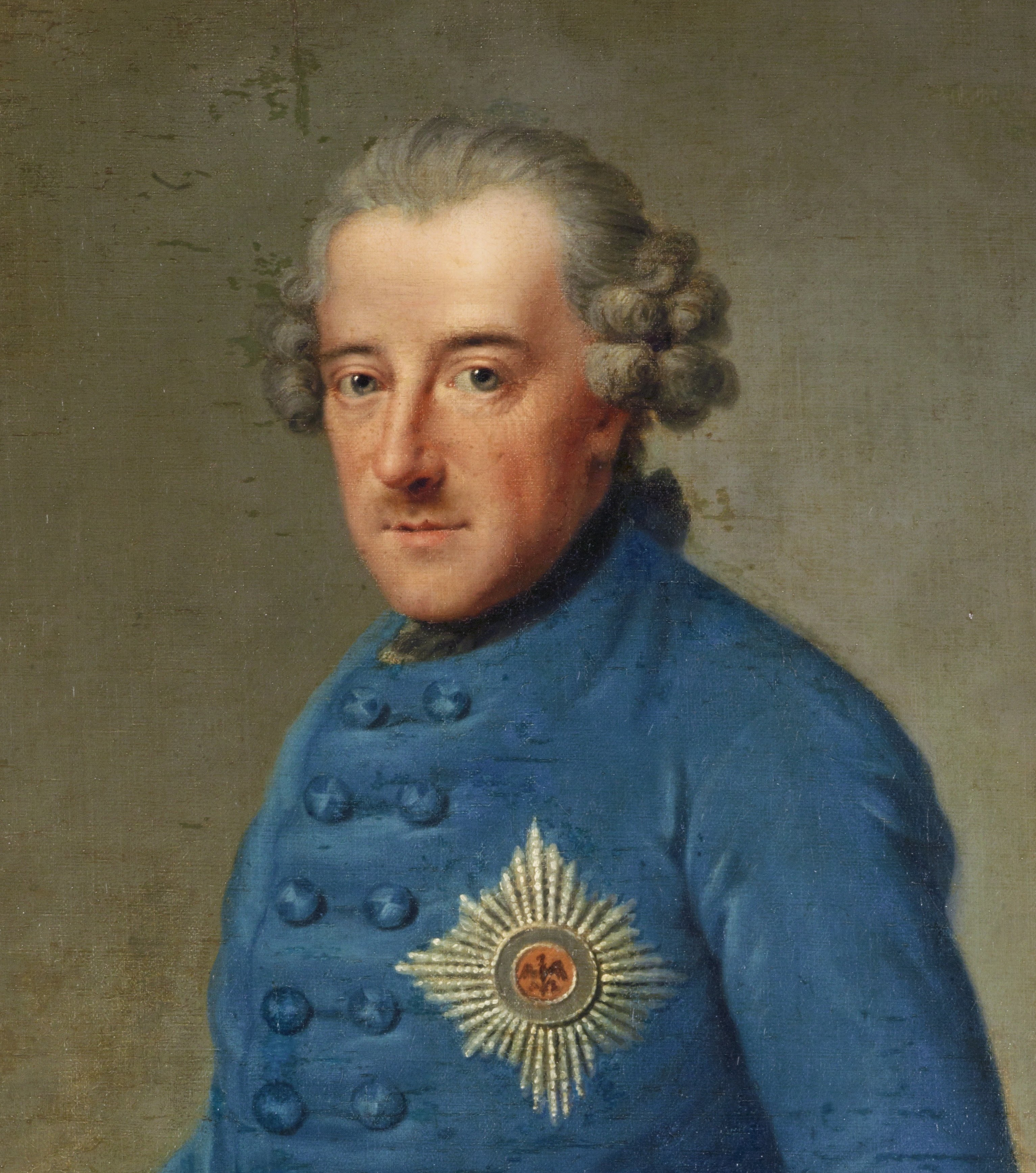
  Frederick the Great
- George II of Great Britain (1683–1760), son of Sophia Dorothea of Celle was matrilineally descended from Alexander II d'Esmiers, Marquis d'Olbreuse, a minor member of the French nobility and a Huguenot.
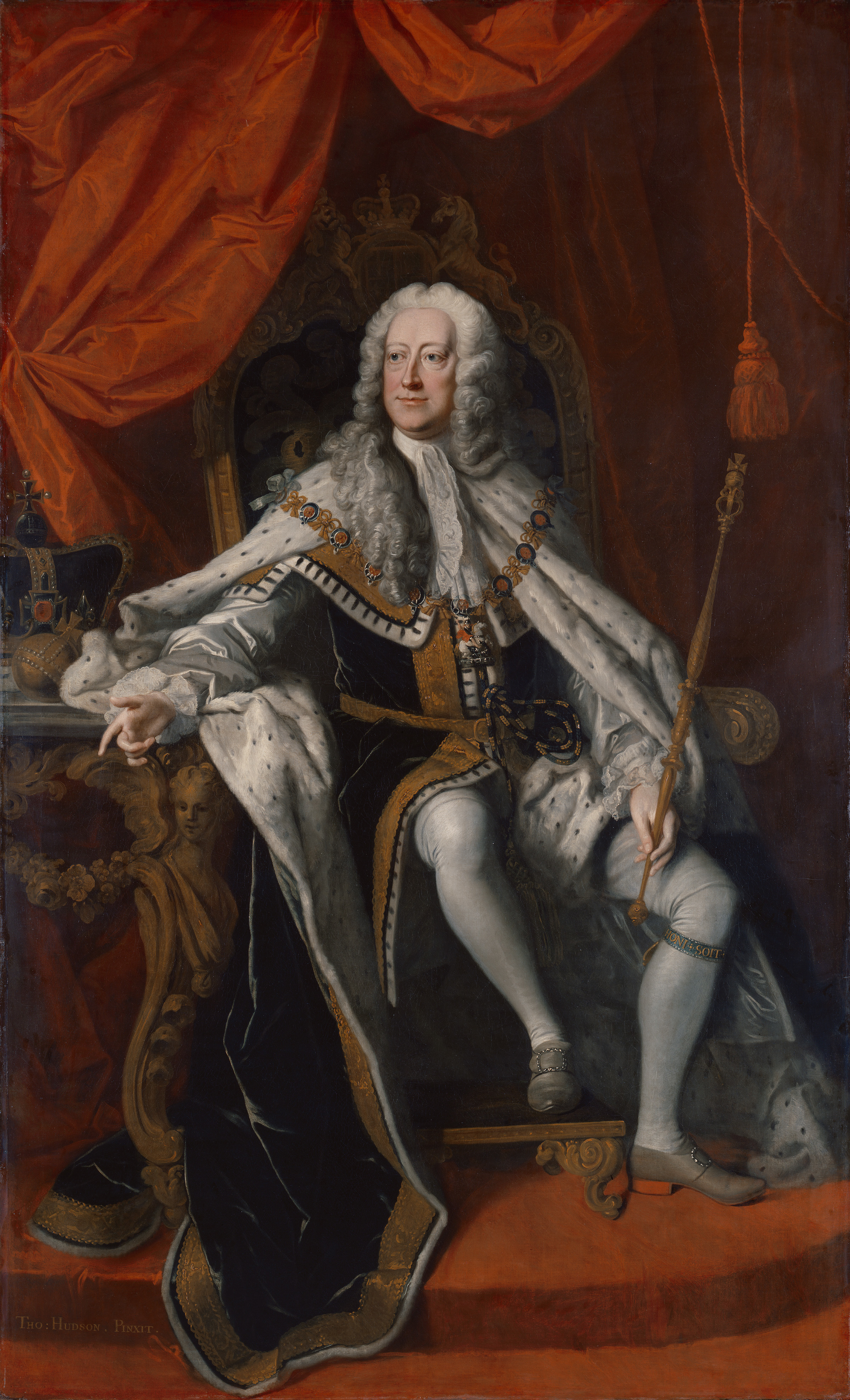
  George II of Great Britain
- George William (1624–1705), Duke of Bunswig.
- Henry IV of France, king of France.
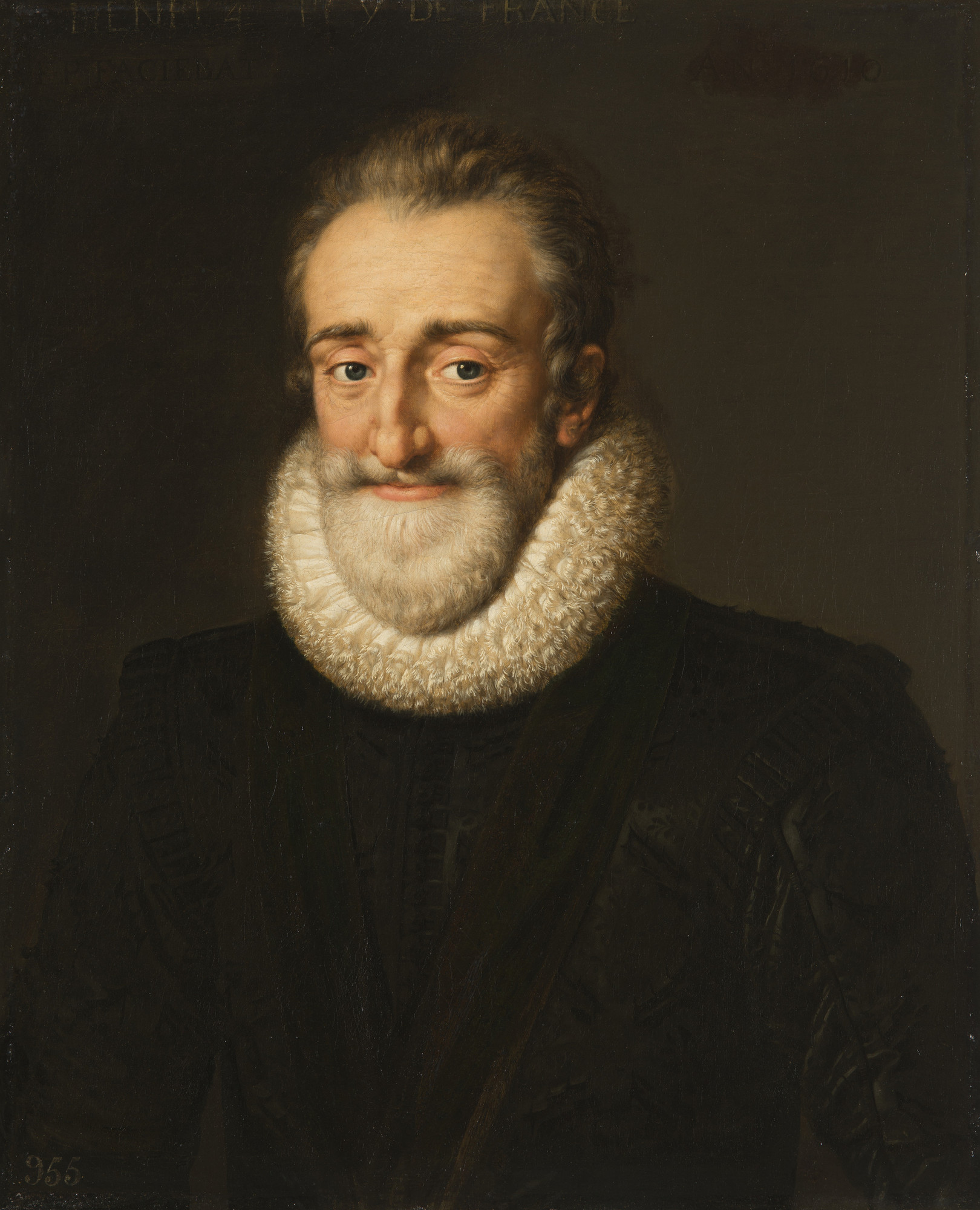
  Henry IV of France
- Louise de Coligny (1555–1620), wife of William the Silent, daughter of Gaspard de Coligny and Charlotte de Laval.
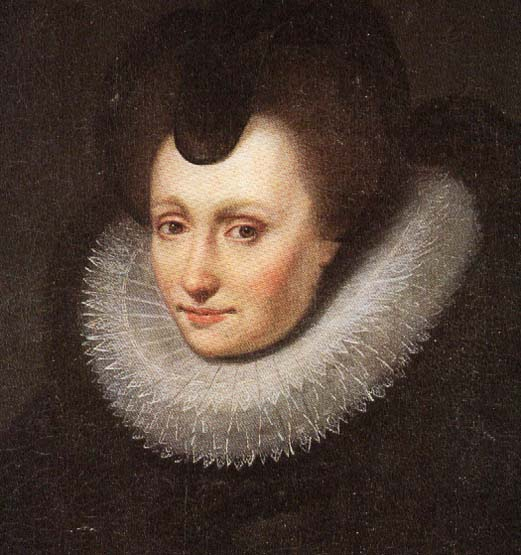
  Louise de Coligny
- Renée de France (1510–1575), member of the royal family.
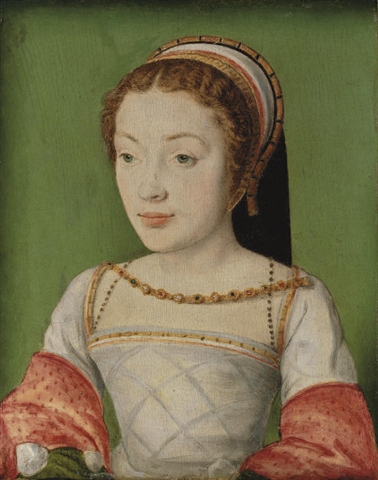
  Renée de France
- Jeanne d'Albret (1528–1572), ruler, mother of Henri IV.
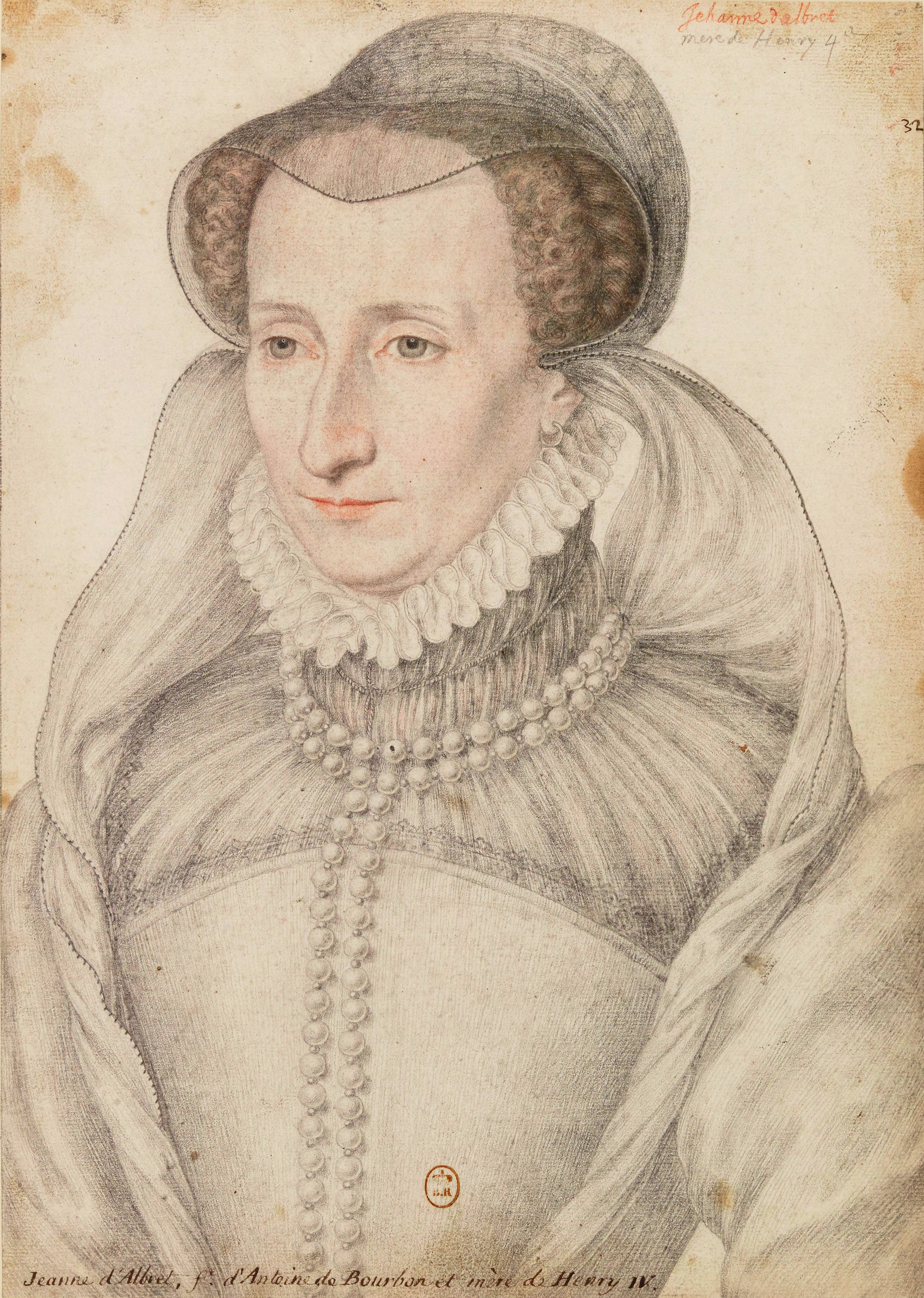
  Jeanne d'Albret
- Margaret of Valois-Angoulême (1492–1549), Queen of Navarre, short story writer (The Heptaméron) and patron of the arts.
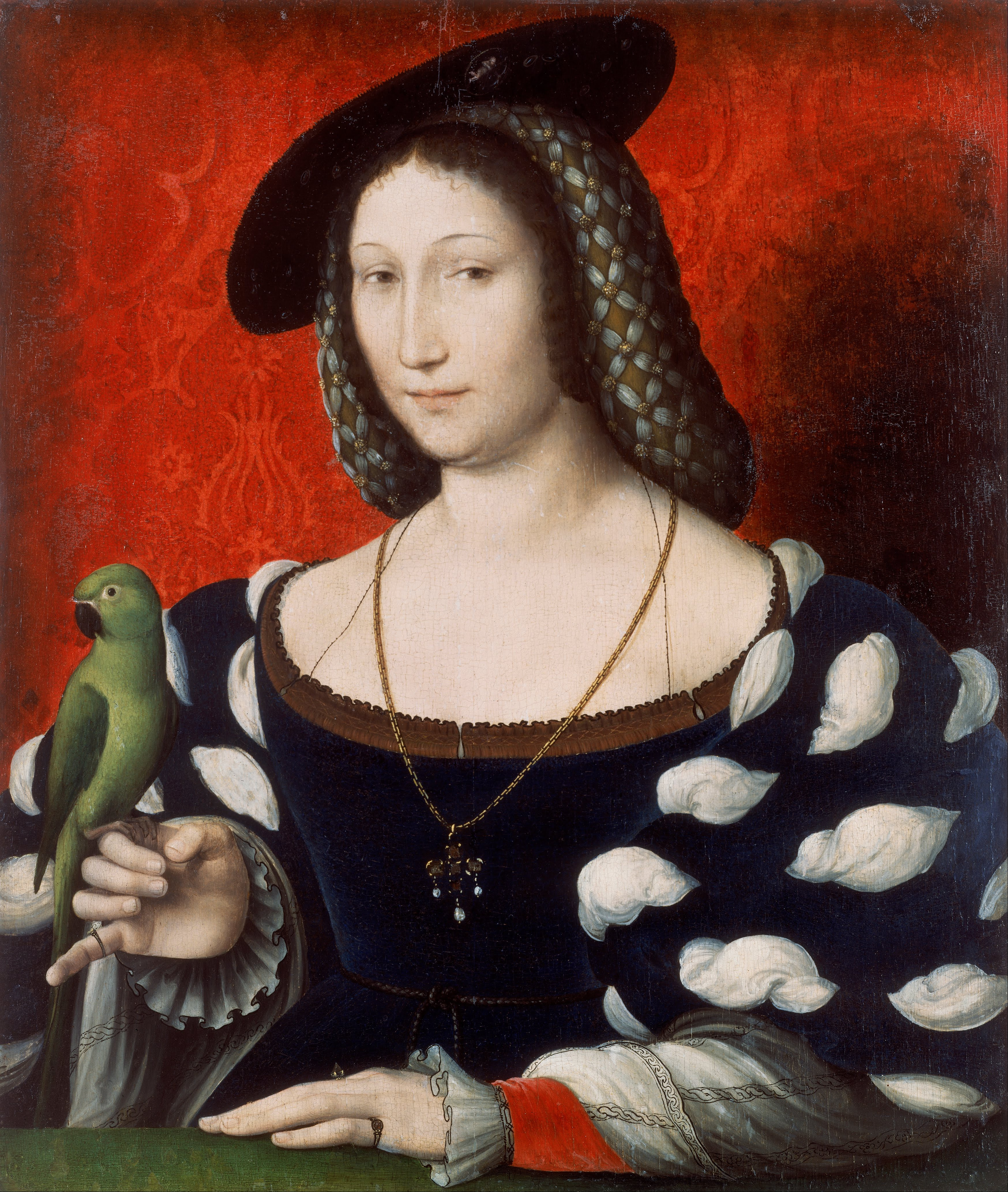
  Margaret of Valois-Angoulême
- Eleonore d'Esmier d'Olbreuse (1639–1722), Countess of Wilhelmsburg, grandmother of King George II of Great Britain.
- Wallis Simpson (1896–1986), wife of Edward VIII, descendant of Mareen Duvall.
- Queen Victoria (1819–1901), Queen of the United Kingdom, Empress of the British Empire, had Huguenot ancestry via King George II.
- Wilhelm II, German Emperor (1859–1941), descended from Admiral Coligny and the Prince of Orange.
- William, Prince of Wales (1982–), heir to the British throne, has Huguenot ancestors on both sides of his family, including William of Orange, Charlotte de Bourbon Montpensier, the Marquis de Ruvigny, Viscount de Rohan, Gaspard de Coligny, Duke de Schonberg and the Rochefoucaulds.

== Scientists and engineers ==
- Joseph Bazalgette (1819–1891), London sewer engineer.
- Paul D. Boyer (1918–2018), American chemist, Nobel Prize winner.
- Isambard Kingdom Brunel (1806–1859), engineer.
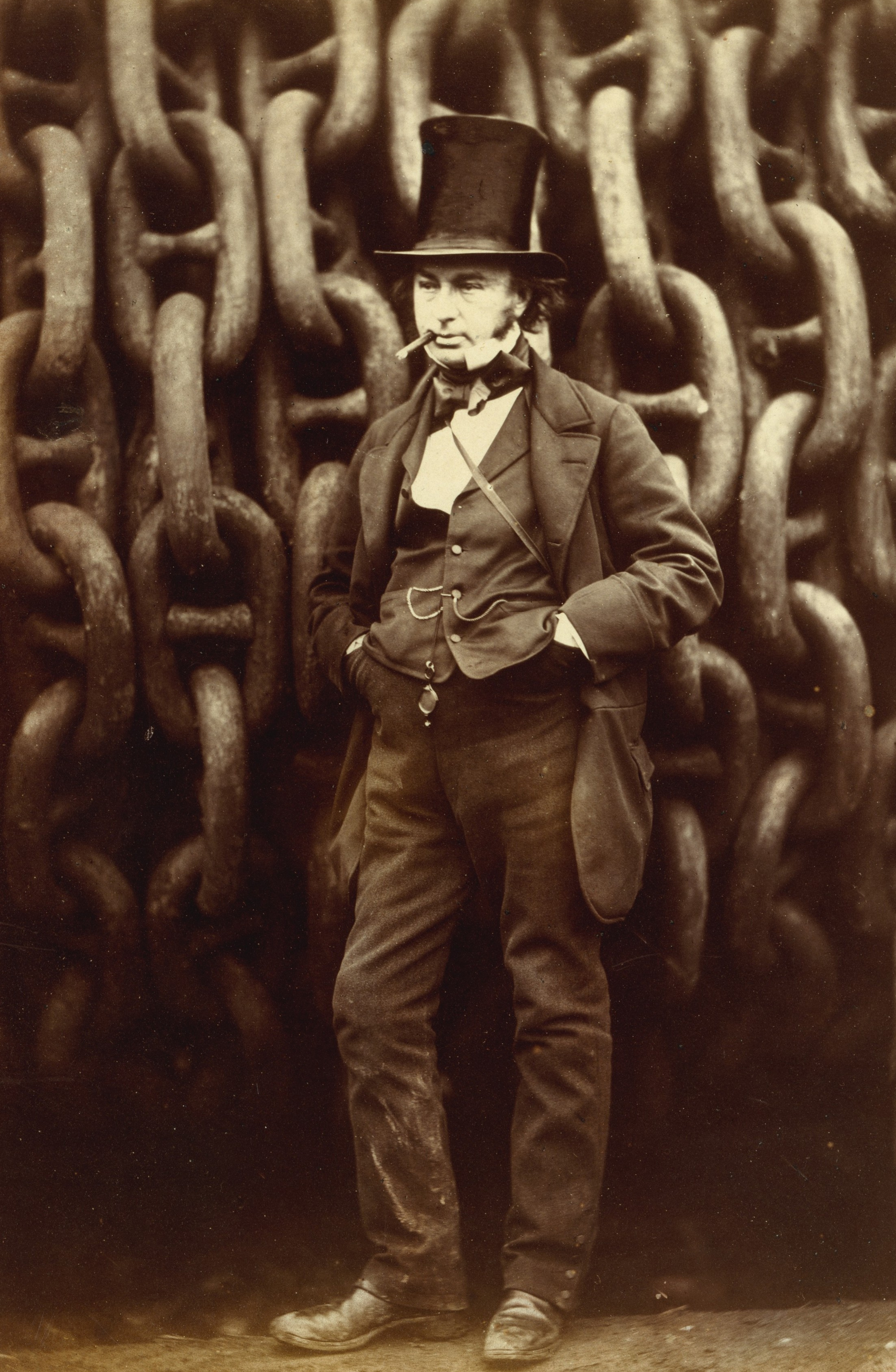
  Isambard Kingdom Brunel
- Georges Cuvier (1769–1832), French naturalist and zoologist, founder of paleontology, opponent of evolutionary theory, proponent of the theory of catastrophism, creationist.
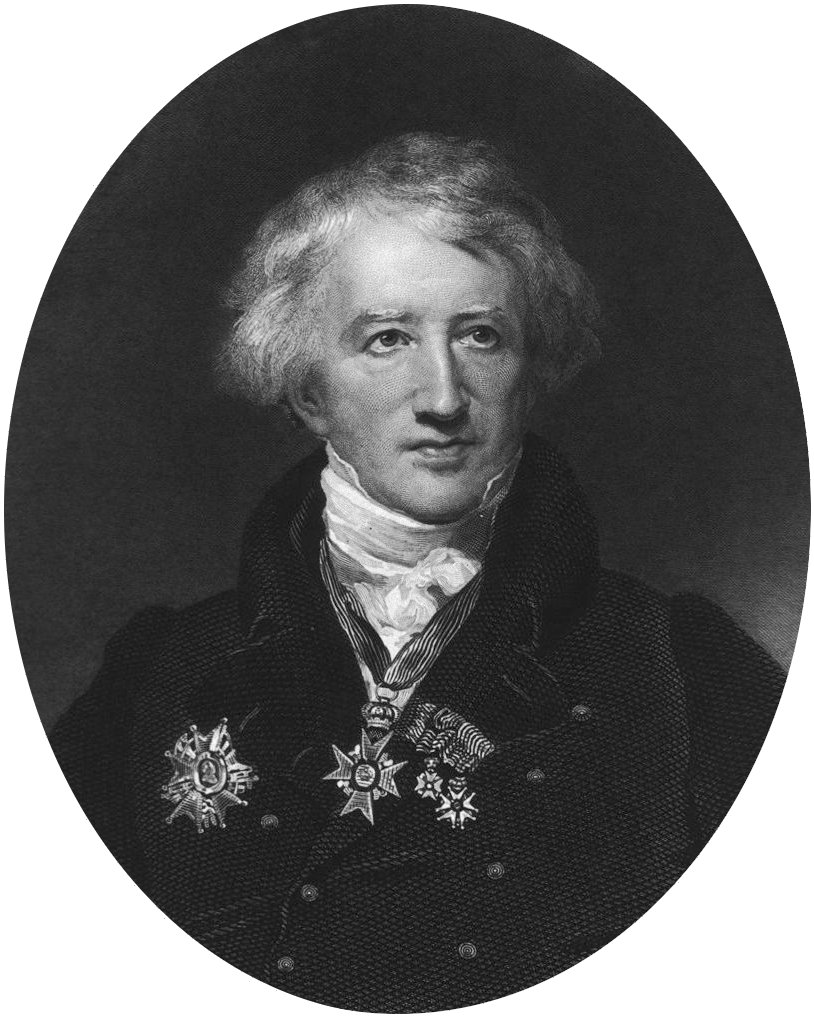
  Georges Cuvier
- Augustin Pyramus de Candolle, Swiss botanist.
- Abraham de Moivre (1667–1754), French mathematician (de Moivre's Formula and Binet's Formula), insurance industry founder, member of the Royal Society of London, friend of Isaac Newton and Edmund Halley, imprisoned for his faith after the Revocation of the Edict of Nantes before fleeing to London.
- Augustus De Morgan, British mathematician.
- Pierre Jean Édouard Desor (1811–1882), German naturalist.
- Emil du Bois-Reymond (1818–1896), German physiologist.
- Alexander du Toit (1878–1948), South African geologist.
- Daniel du Toit (1917–1981), South African astronomer.
- Paul J. Flory (1910–1985), American chemist, Nobel Prize winner
- Édouard Gruner, engineer, first president of the Protestant Federation of France, pacifist.
- Danie G. Krige (1919–2013), South African mining engineer.
- Charles Labelye, engineer.
- Thomas Laby (1880–1946), Australian scientist.
- Georges-Louis Le Sage (1724–1803), scientist.
- Matthew Fontaine Maury, father of modern oceanography and naval meteorology
- Jacques Monod (1910–1976), biologist, Nobel Prize winner, atheist from Huguenot family.
- Théodore Monod (1902–2000), naturalist, explorer, activist.
- Denis Papin (1647–1713), inventor of the pressure cooker and an early type of steam boat.

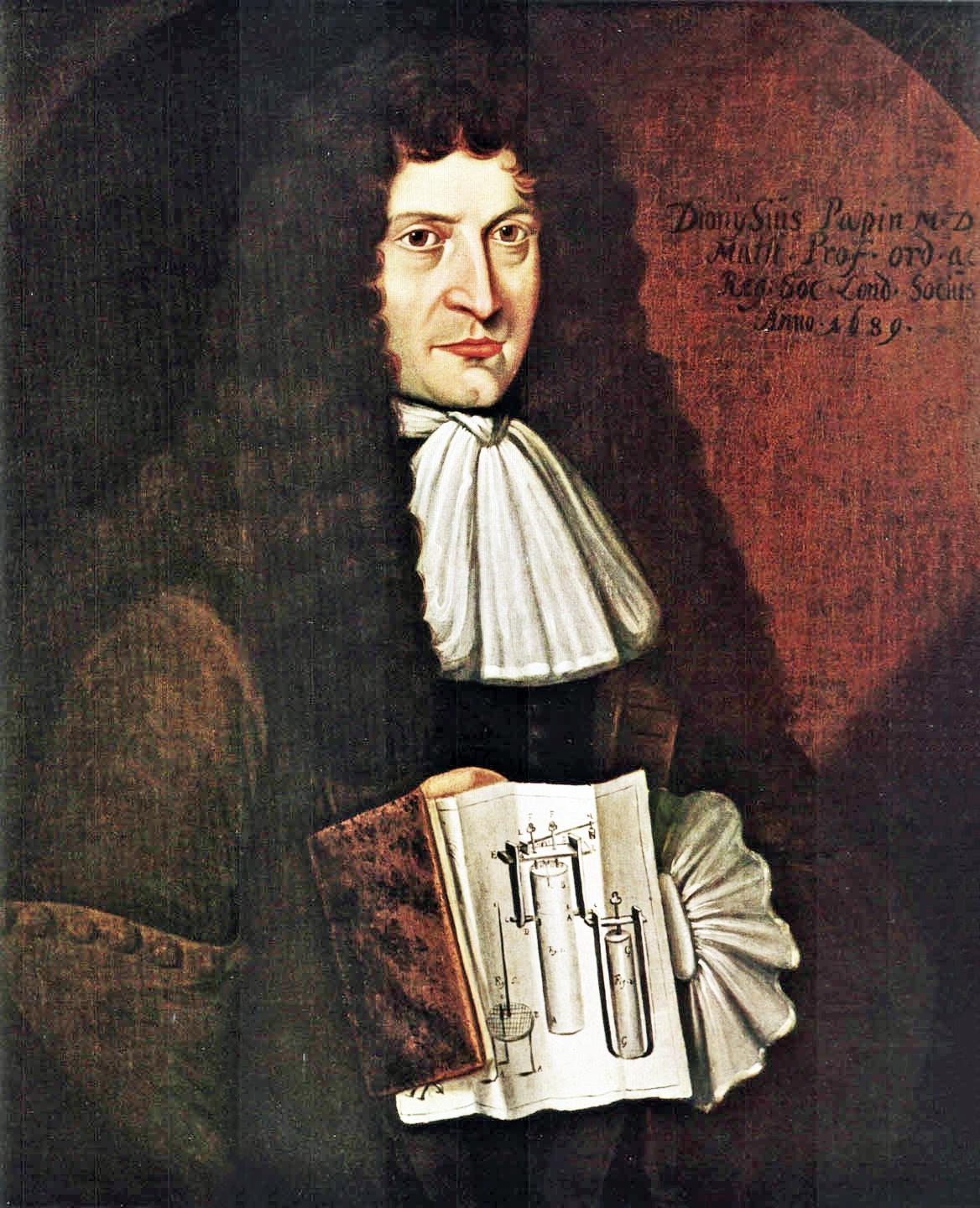
Denis Papin

- Arthur Alcock Rambaut, Royal Astronomer of Ireland, Radcliffe Observer at the Radcliffe Observatory, Oxford University
- Roger Revelle, one of the first scientists to study global warming and tectonic plates
- David Rivett (1885–1961), Australian scientist, helped found the CSIRO, son of a Congregationalist minister.
- Francis Peyton Rous (1879–1970), American virologist, Nobel Prize winner.
- Conrad Schlumberger (1878–1936), geophysicist.
- Marcel Schlumberger (1884–1953), geophysicist.
- Alexander von Humboldt (1769–1859), German naturalist.
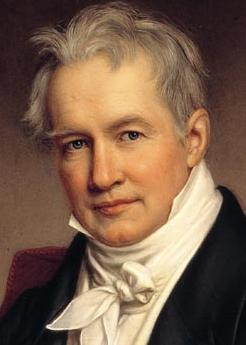
  Alexander von Humboldt
- Philipp von Jolly (1809–1884), German physicist and mathematician.
- The Wright Brothers, American inventors and aviation pioneers, descended from the Huguenot Gano family of New Rochelle, New York.

== Sportspeople ==
- Richie Benaud (1930–2015), Australian cricketer, commentator.
  Richie Benaud
- Andy Blignaut (1978–), Zimbabwean cricketer.
- Bernard Bosanquet (1877–1936), English cricketer.
- Roy Cazaly (1893–1963), Australian Rules footballer.
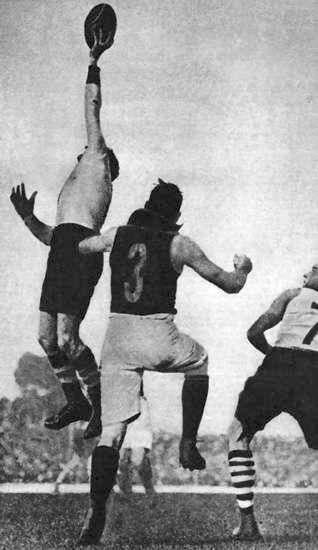
  Roy Cazaly
- Brandi Chastain (1968–), US soccer player.
- Ross Chastain (1992–), NASCAR driver
- Tony Cottee (1965–), West Ham United and England footballer.
- Piers Courage (1942–1970), English racing driver
- Hansie Cronje (1969–2002), South African cricketer.
- Phil de Glanville (1968–), England rugby union international
- AB De Villiers (1984–), South African cricketer, practising Christian.
- Dawie de Villiers (1940–2022), South African rugby union player, pastor and politician.
- Fanie de Villiers (1964–), South African cricketer.
- Jean de Villiers (1981–), South African rugby player.
- Peter de Villiers (1957–), South African rugby coach.
- Pieter de Villiers (1982–), South African hurdler.
- Pieter de Villiers (1972–), South African rugby player.
- Freda Du Faur (1882–1935), Australian mountaineer.
- Faf du Plessis (1984–), South African cricketer.
- Morné du Plessis (1949–), South African rugby player.
- Frik du Preez (1935–), South African rugby player.
- Mignon du Preez (1989–), South African cricketer.
- Hempies du Toit (1953–), South African rugby player and winemaker.
- Francois du Toit Roux (1939–), South African rugby player.
- Olivier Giroud (1986–), French footballer.
- Jürgen Hahn (1950–), German handball player.
- Marius Joubert (1979–), South African rugby player.
- Marnus Labuschagne (1994–), South African-born Australian cricketer.
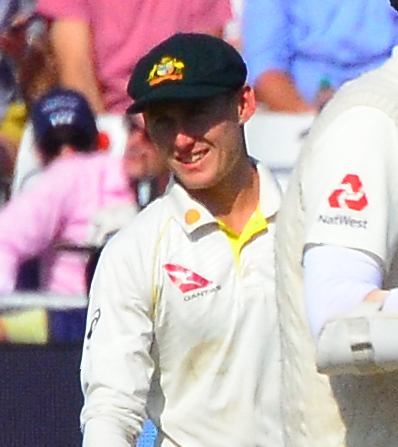
  Marnus Labuschagne
- Frederick Le Roux (1882–1963), South African cricketer.
- Garth Le Roux (1955–), South African cricketer.
- Paul Michael Levesque (1969–), American pro wrestler famous under pseudonym of Triple H
- Andre Nel (1977–), South African cricketer.
- Roland Peugeot, member of the management committee of the French Golf Federation (French Lutheran).
- François Pienaar (1967–), South African rugby player; captain of the first Springboks team to win the Rugby World Cup in 1995.
- Elfrida Pigou (1911–1960), Canadian mountaineer
- Rilee Rossouw (1989–), South African cricketer.
- Michel Seydoux (1947–), head of Lille football club (LOSC) and film producer.
- Juan "Rusty" Theron (1985–), South African cricketer.
- Henry Vigne (1817–1898), English cricketer and clergyman.

== Translators ==
- Sarah Austin (1793–1867), translator of German language books who did much to make Germany familiar to English readers.
- Pierre Coste (1668–1747), translator, member of the Rainbow Coffee House Group.
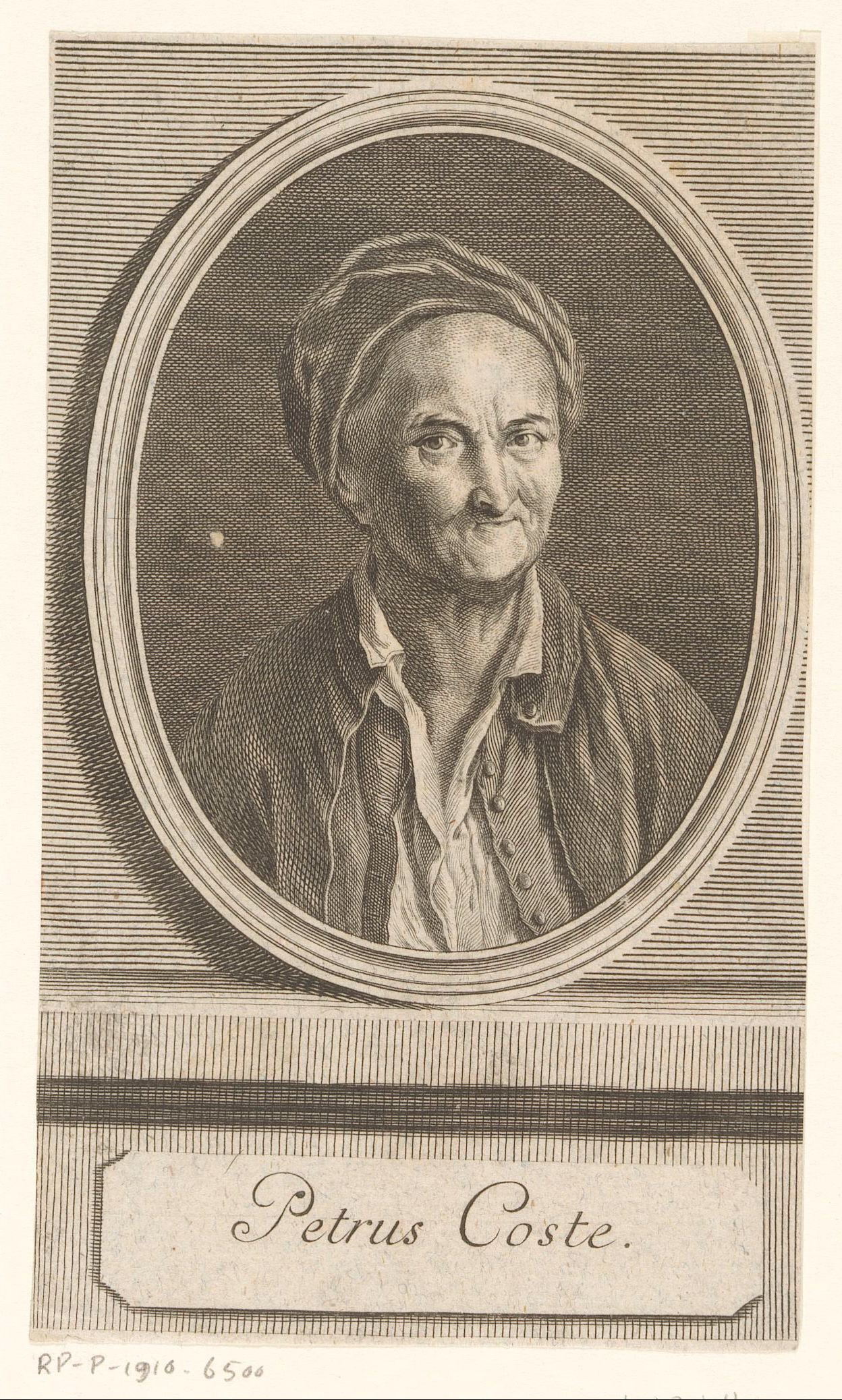
  Pierre Coste
- Marie De Cotteblanche (1520–1583), French noblewoman known for her skill in languages and translation of works from Spanish to French.
- John Theophilus Desaguliers (1683–1744), translator, major figure in British Freemasonry, natural philosopher, clergyman, engineer, was elected to the Royal Society in 1714 as experimental assistant to Isaac Newton, born in La Rochelle.
- Claudius Hollyband (1534–1594), translator, from Moulins.
- Peter Anthony Motteux (1663–1718), translator, journalist and dramatist.
- Lewis Page Mercier (1820–1875), British translator of Jules Verne into English, reverend, grandson of a Louis Mercier who was pastor at Threadneedle Street.

== Weavers and textile manufacturers ==
- Joseph André, inventor of denim.
- George Courtauld, weaver.
- Charles Dalbiac (1726–1808), Spitalfields weaver, brother of James Dalbiac.
- Auguste Marie Fabre (1839–1922), French silk manufacturer and pacifist.
- Christophe-Philippe Oberkampf (1738–1815), printed fabric manufacturer.
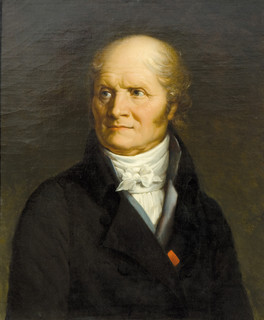
  Christophe-Philippe Oberkampf
- Daniel Pilon, Spitalfields master weaver.

== Writers ==
- Alfred Ainger (1837–1904), English writer and humorist, evangelical Anglican minister, honorary chaplain to Queen Victoria.
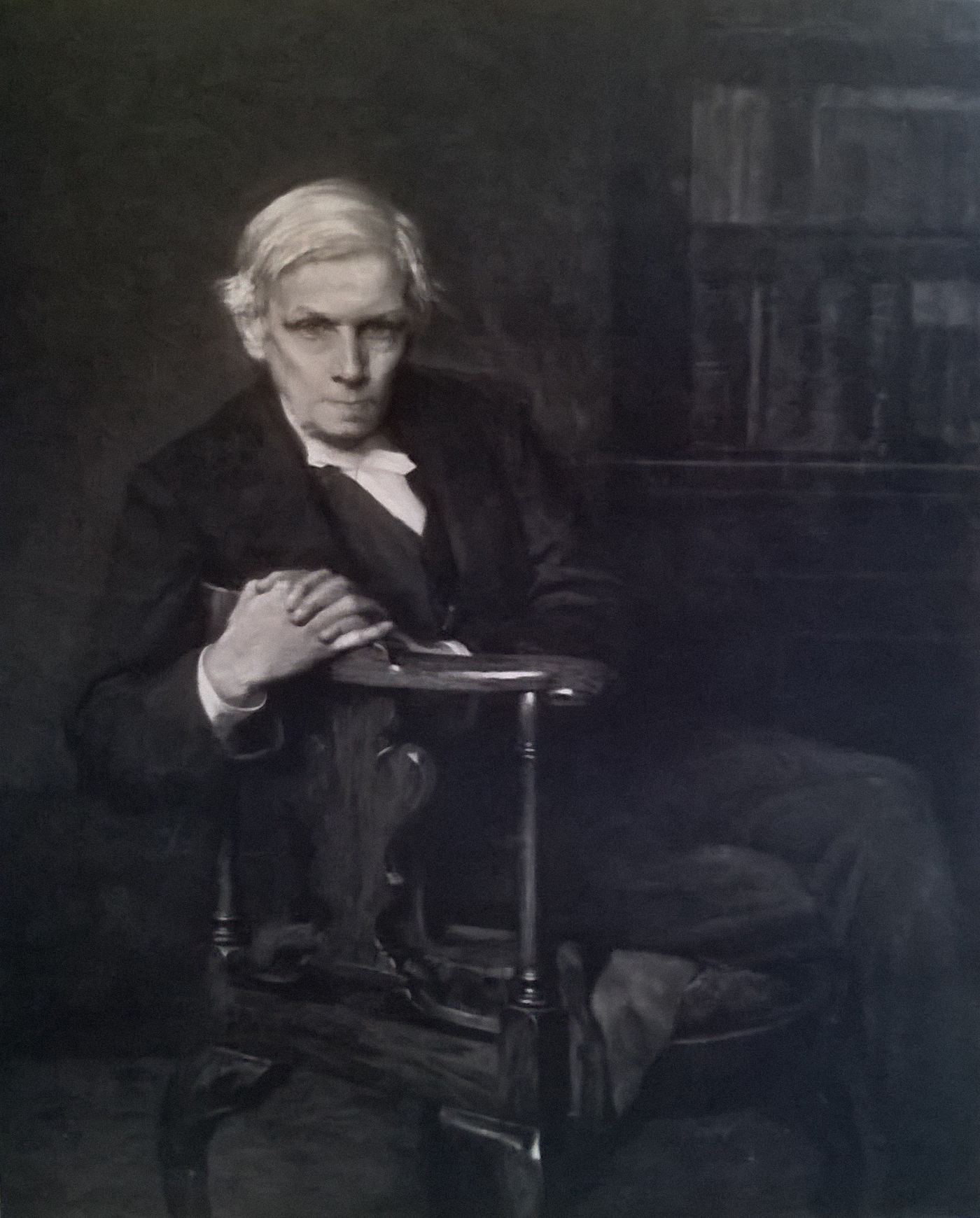
  Alfred Ainger
- Willibald Alexis (1798–1871), German writer. Key work: Der Werwulf.
- Samuel Beckett (1906–1989), Irish novelist and playwright. Key work: Waiting for Godot.
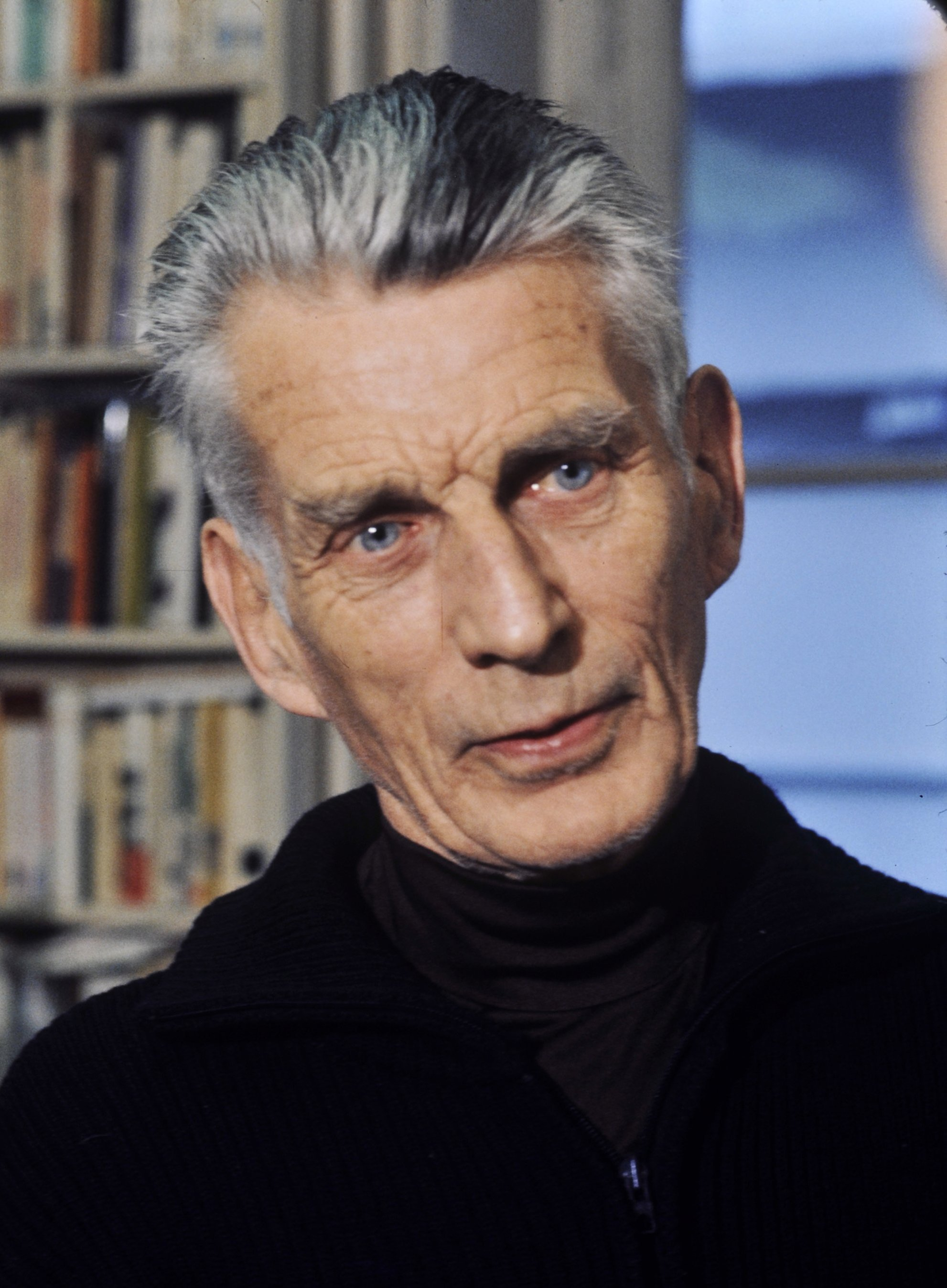
  Samuel Beckett
- Enid Barraud (1904–1972)
- John Bulteel (c. 1627–1692), writer.
- Jan F. E. Celliers, South African poet, essayist, dramatist and reviewer.
- Frederick Chamier (1796–1870), British novelist. Key work: Ben Brace.
- George Chamier, Australian author.
- André Chamson (1900–1983), novelist and pacifist, President of PEN International from 1956 to 1959. Key work: Roux le Bandit.
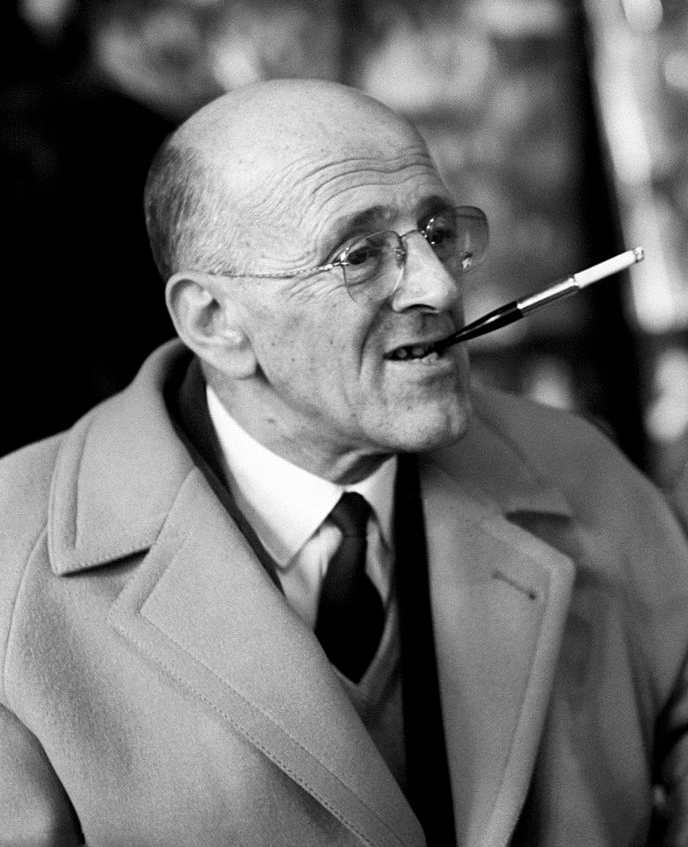
  André Chamson
- Samuel Chappuzeau (1625–1701), French author, poet and playwright. Key work: Le Cercle des Femmes.
- Jacques Chardonne (real name Jacques Boutelleau) (1884–1968), writer. Key work: Les Destinées Sentimentales.
- Tracy Chevalier (1962–), American-British novelist. Key work: Girl with a Pearl Earring.
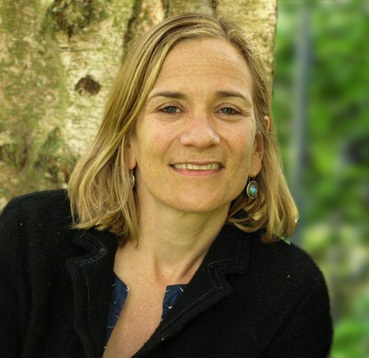
  Tracy Chevalier
- Valentin Conrart (1603–1675), writer.
- Charles J. Fourie
- Benjamin Constant (1767–1830), Swiss writer. Key work: Adolphe.
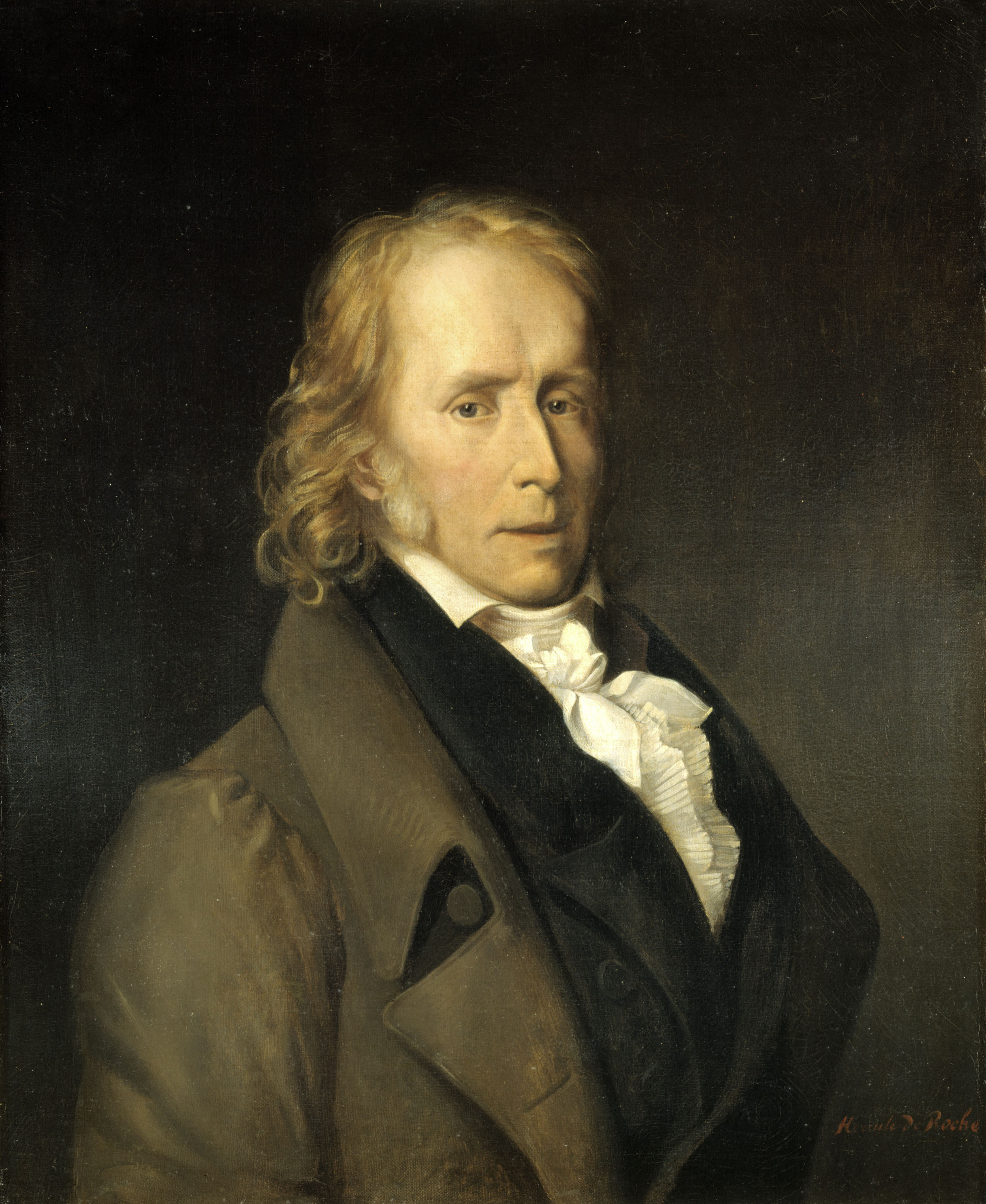
  Benjamin Constant
- Agrippa d'Aubigné (1552–1630), French poet.
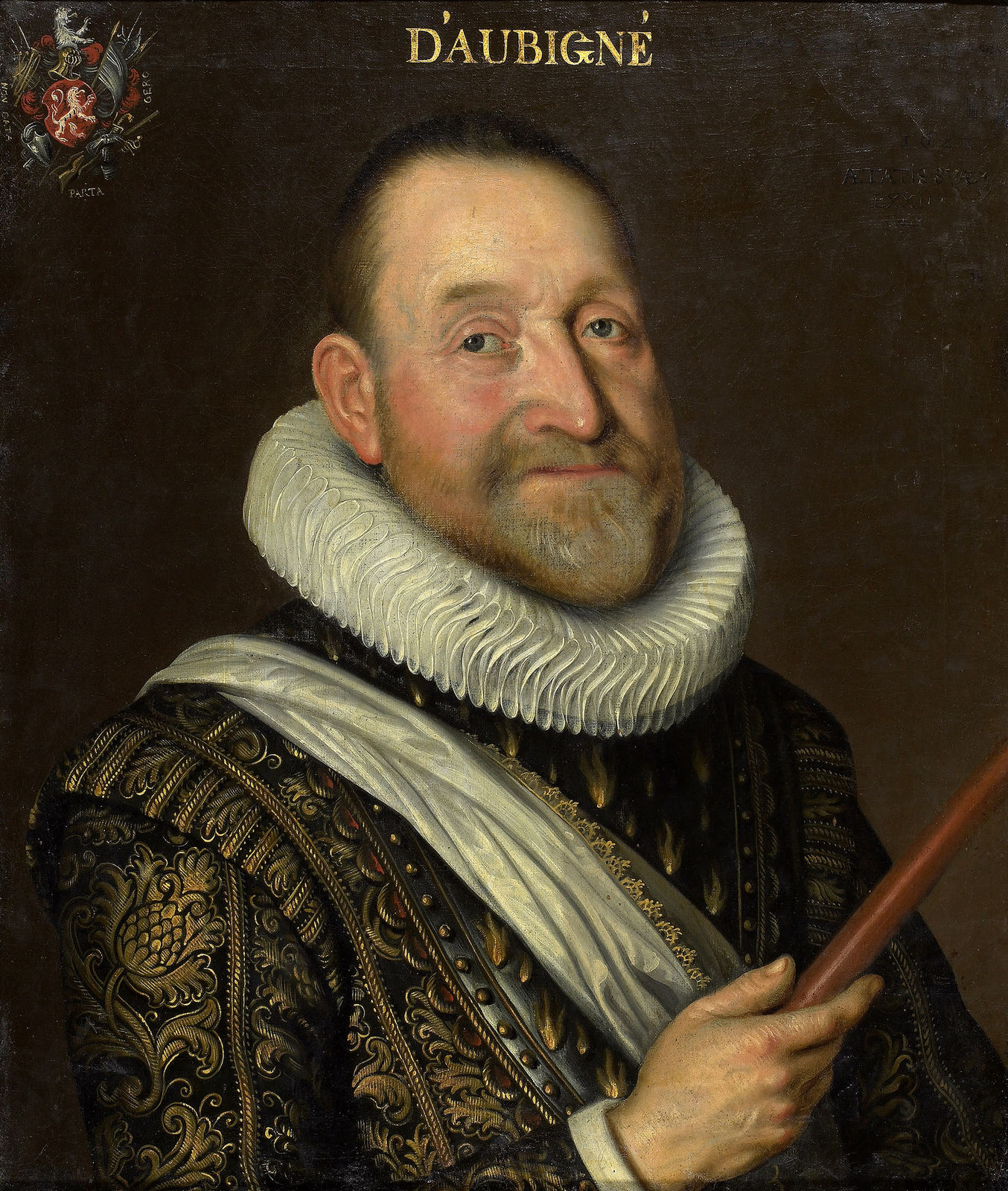
  Agrippa d'Aubigné
- Eustorg de Beaulieu, writer. Key work: Songs and coats of arms.
- Louis de Bernières, English writer. Key work: Captain Corelli's Mandolin.
- Gabriel de Foigny, French writer. Key work: Terres Australes.
- Evalena Fryer Hedley (1865–1943), journalist, editor, and author
- Walter De La Mare (1873–1956), English poet and novelist. Key work: The Return.
- Friedrich de la Motte Fouqué (1777–1843), German author, grandson of Heinrich August de la Motte Fouqué. Key work: Undine.
  Friedrich de la Motte Fouqué
- Pierre de La Primaudaye (1546–1619), French writer. Key work: L'Academie Française.
- François de La Rochefoucauld (1613–1680), author. His great-grandfather François III, count de La Rochefoucauld, was killed in the St. Bartholomew's Day massacre. Key work: Maxims.
- Anne de La Roche-Guilhem (1644–1707), novelist.
- Jean de La Taille, playwright. Key work: From the Art of Tragedy.
- Georgette de Montenay (1540–1607), poet.
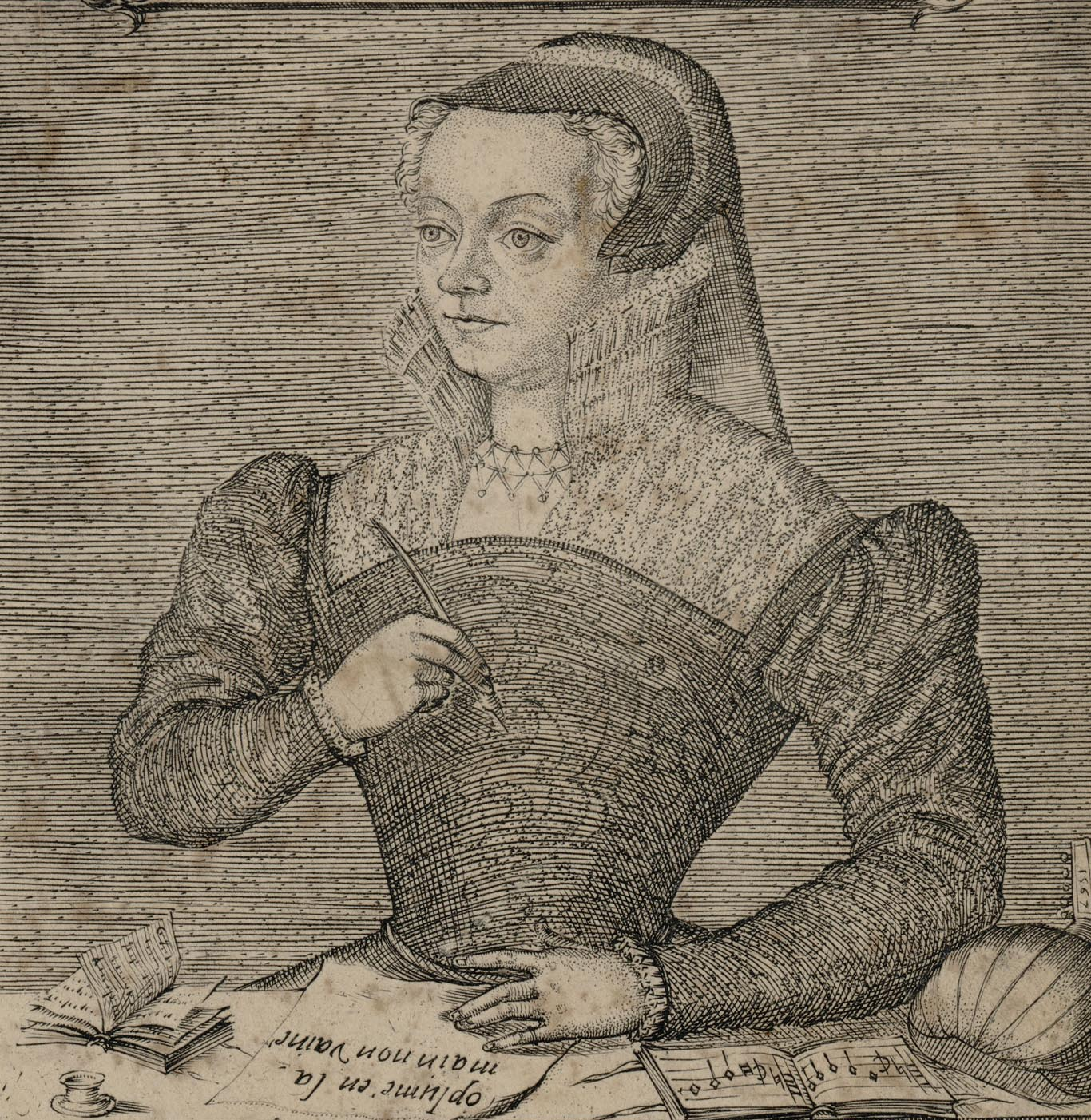
  Georgette de Montenay
- Marie Dentière (1495–1561), writer, theologian.
- Catherine de Parthenay (1554–1631), poet, playwright and mathematician, mother of Henri de Rohan.
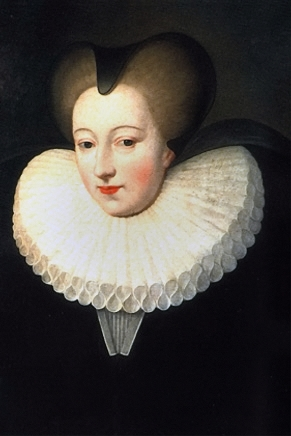
  Catherine de Parthenay
- Guillaume de Salluste Du Bartas (1544–1590), French poet and courtier.
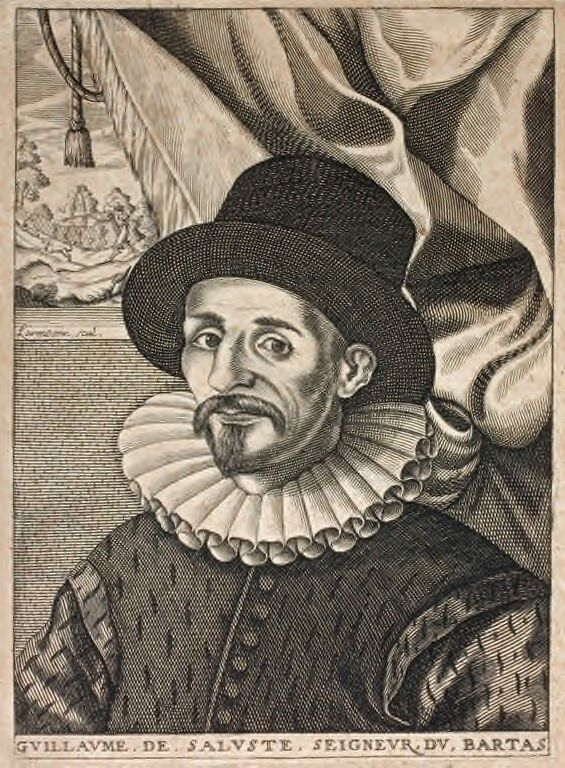
  Guillaume de Salluste Du Bartas
- Pierre des Maizeaux (1666–1745), author and translator, member of the Rainbow Coffee House Group.
- Jean de Sponde (1557–1595), poet, later converted to Roman Catholicism.
- Germaine de Staël (1766–1817), writer, daughter of Jacques Necker.
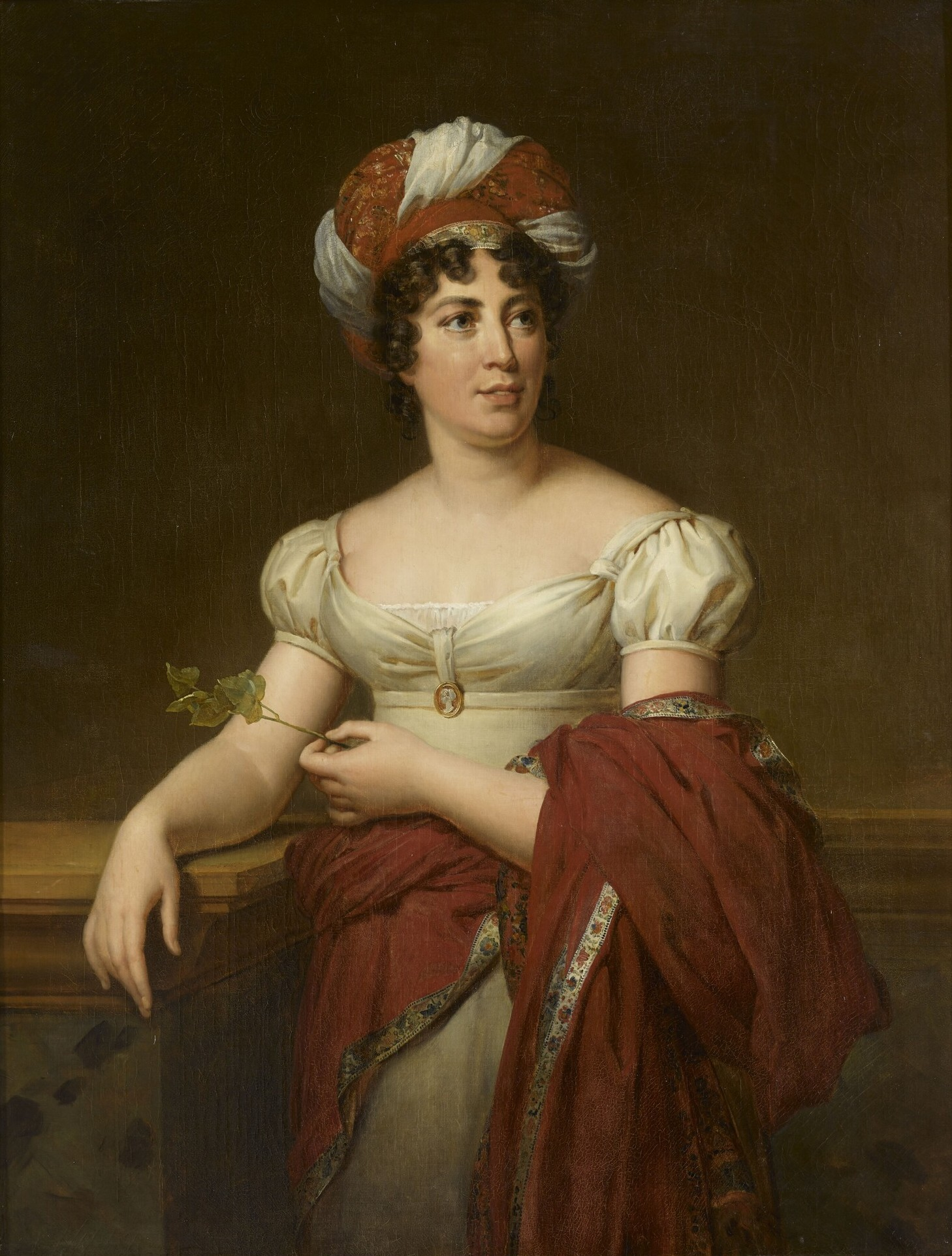
  Germaine de Staël
- Théophile de Viau (1590–1626), poet, playwright, convicted blasphemer, atheist born to a Huguenot family, committed suicide.
- Daphne du Maurier (1907–1989), English writer. Key work: Rebecca.
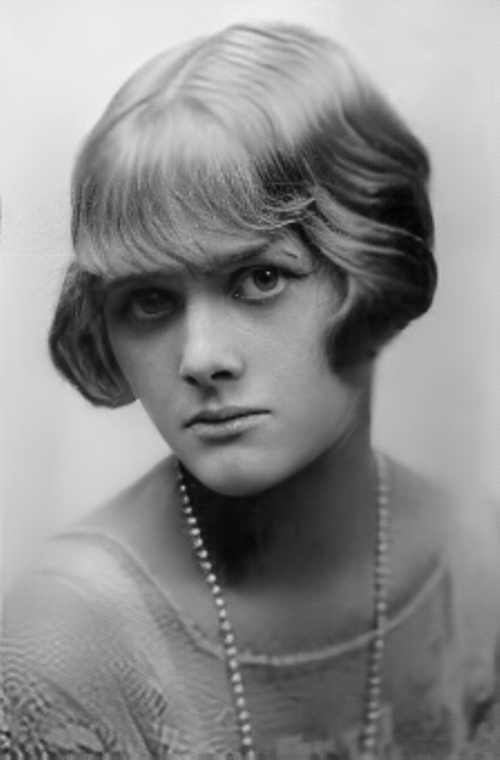
  Daphne du Maurier
- George du Maurier (1834–1896), English author, Punch cartoonist. Key work: Trilby.
- Guy du Maurier (1865–1915), playwright, son of George du Maurier and uncle of Daphne du Maurier.
- I. D. du Plessis (1900–1981), South African poet, member of the Dertigers group.
- Totius (poet) (Jacob Daniël du Toit) (1877–1953), South African poet, Apartheid advocate.
- Wilhelmina FitzClarence (1830–1906), English author.
- Ian Fleming (1908–1964), British writer, Huguenot ancestry on his mother's side.
- Theodor Fontane (1819–1898), German novelist, poet. Key work: Effi Briest.
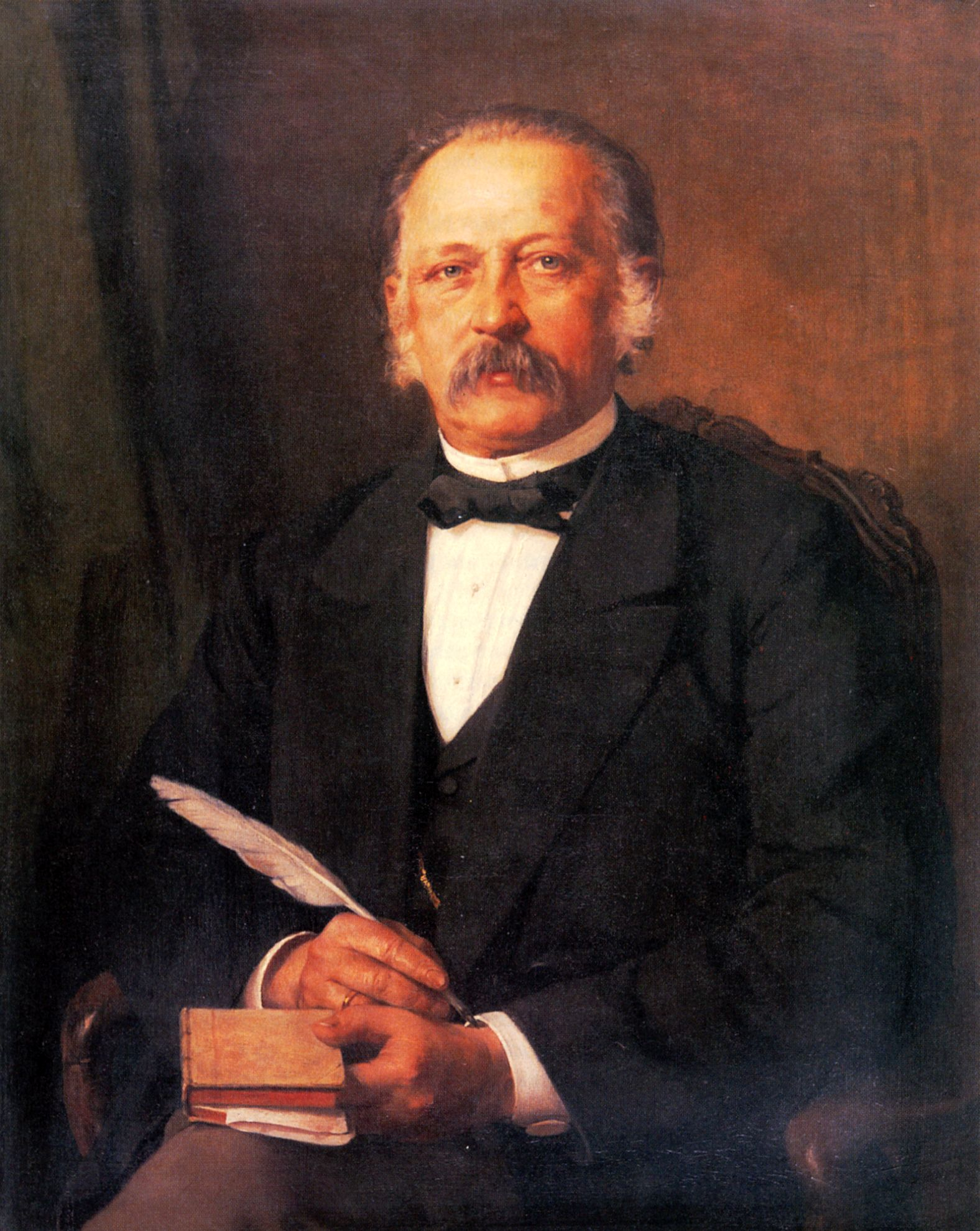
  Theodor Fontane
- Philip Morin Freneau, American poet
- André Gide (1869–1951), French author, Nobel Prize winner. Key work: La Symphonie Pastorale.
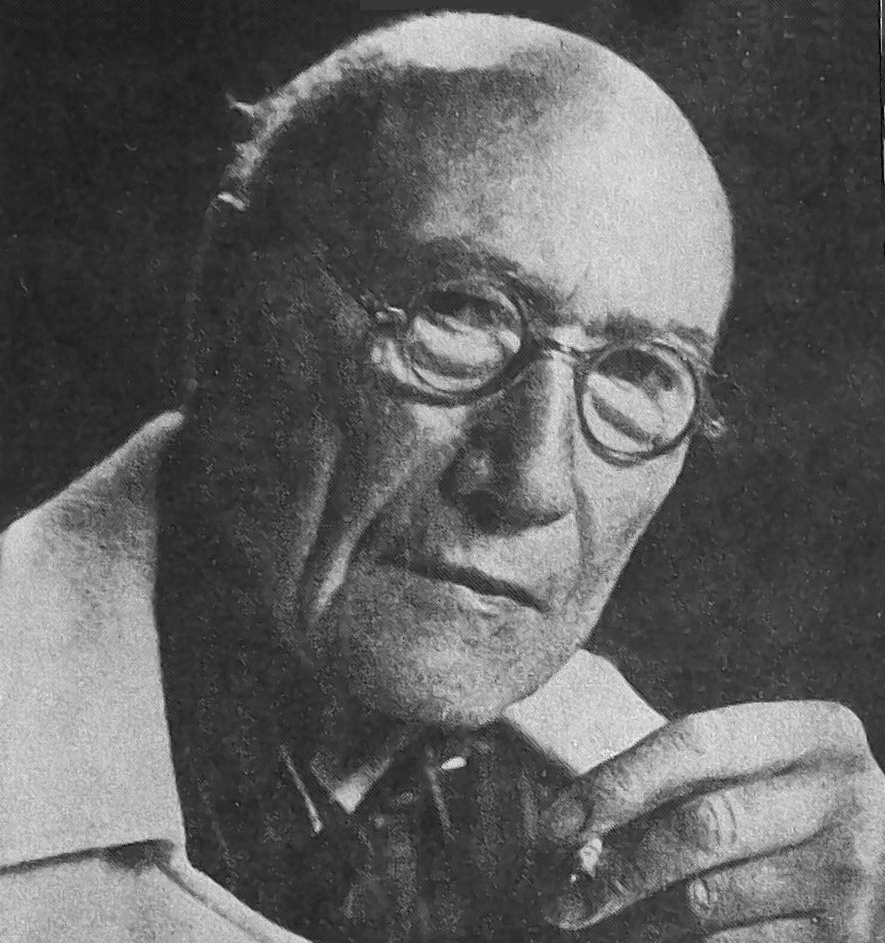
  André Gide
- Christian Giudicelli (1942–2022), French novelist and literary critic, mother was a Protestant from Nîmes.
- Henriette Guizot de Witt (1829–1908), novelist, daughter of François Guizot. Key work: Légendes et récits pour la jeunesse.
- Dashiell Hammett (1894–1961), American author, Marxist, descended from the De Schiells family. Key work: The Maltese Falcon.
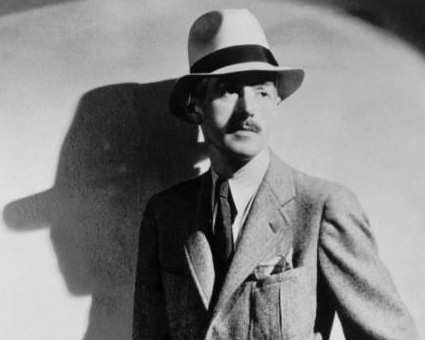
  Dashiell Hammett
- Maurice Hewlett (1861–1923), British novelist.
- DuBose Heyward (1885–1940), American novelist, playwright, librettist.
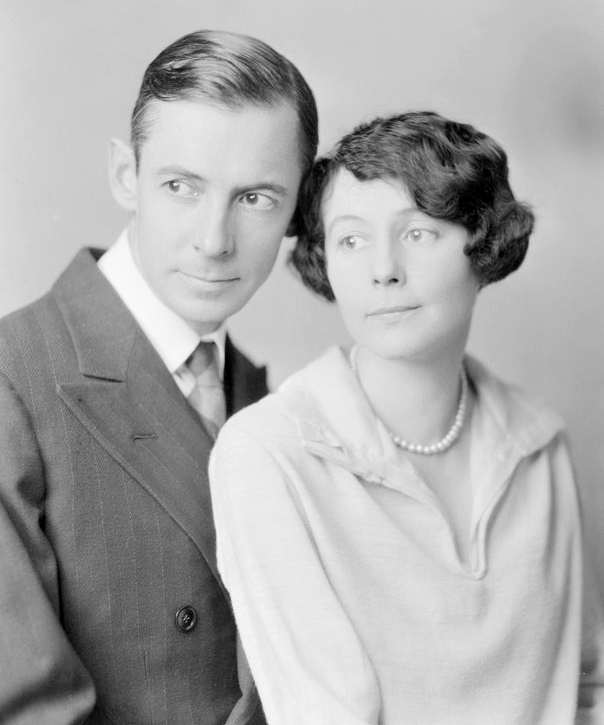
  DuBose Heyward
- Françoise Marguerite Janiçon (1711–1789), writer.
- Elsa Joubert, South African novelist.
- William Larminie, Irish poet.
- Sheridan Le Fanu (1814–1873), Irish writer, Le Fanu family from Caen in Normandy. Key work: Uncle Silas.
- Madeleine L'Engle, American author. Key work: A Wrinkle in Time.
- Henry Wadsworth Longfellow, American poet
- Pierre Loti (real name Louis Marie Julian Viaud) (1850–1923), French Orientalist writer. Key work: An Iceland Fisherman.
- D. F. Malherbe, South African novelist.
- Harriet Martineau (1802–1876), English novelist and travel writer, educational and economic reformer, sociologist, atheist and advocate of Darwinian evolution, descended from a Huguenot family.
- Charles Maturin (1780–1824), Irish Gothic writer and Church of Ireland clergyman, descendant of Huguenot and crippled Bastille prisoner, Gabriel Maturin. Key work: Melmoth the Wanderer.
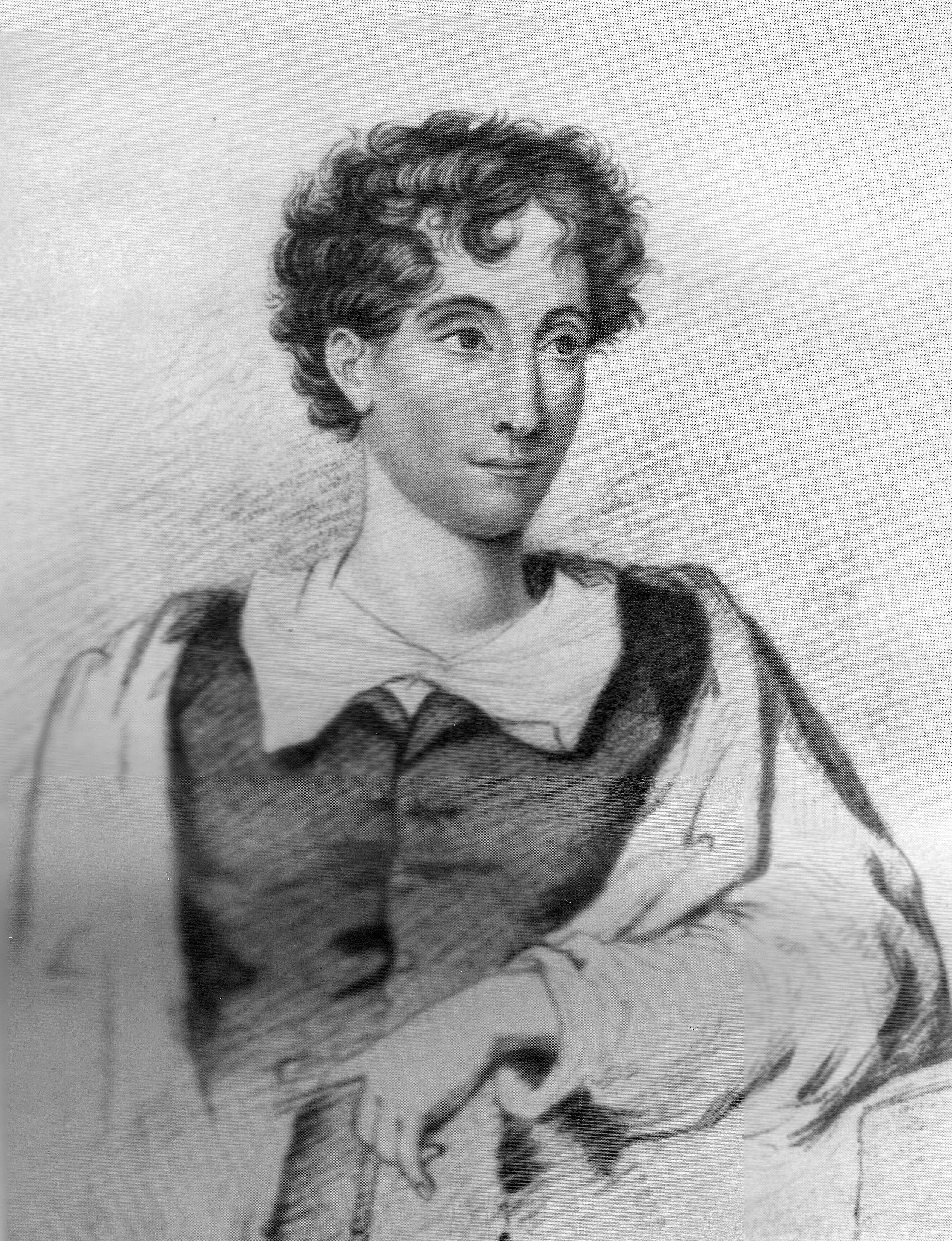
  Charles Maturin
- Edward Maturin (1812–1881), writer, son of Charles Maturin.
- Kate Mosse, English author. Key work: The Burning Chambers.
- Edith Olivier (1872–1948), British novelist, Christian, Conservative Party activist, opponent of Suffragette movement, founder of Wiltshire branch of Women's Land Army in 1916, daughter of the Dean of Wiltshire and related to Sir Laurence Olivier. Key work: The Love Child.
- Tom Paulin, British poet, critic.
- James Planché, British dramatist, officer of arms
- Damon Runyon (1880–1946), American author. Key work: Guys and Dolls.
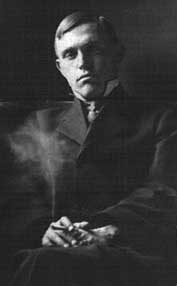
  Damon Runyon
- Lou Andreas Salomé (1861–1937), Russian novelist and psychoanalyst.
- Jean-Paul Sartre (1905–1980), author and philosopher, atheist born to Huguenot family. Key work: The Age of Reason.
- Jean Schlumberger (1877–1968), French novelist. Key work: The Unfaithful Friend.
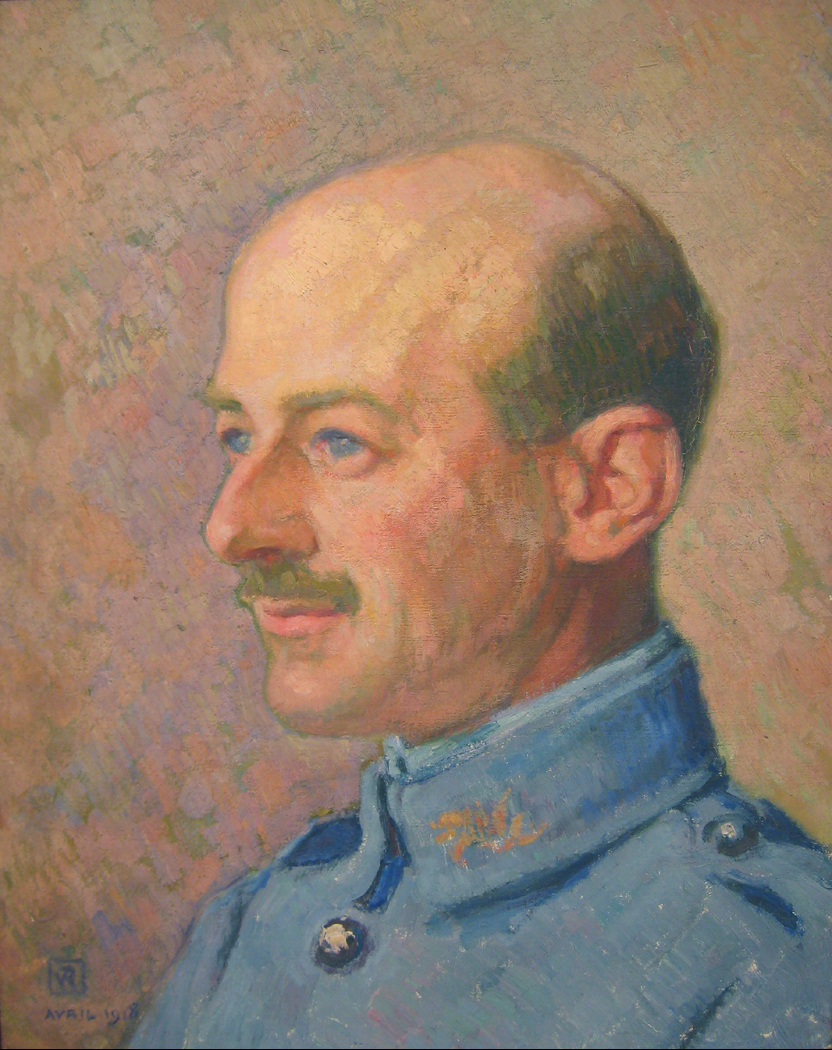
  Jean Schlumberger
- Mary Shelley, English writer, daughter of Mary Wollstonecraft. Key work: Frankenstein.
- Henry David Thoreau (1817–1862), American writer.
- Dorothea Viehmann (1755–1816), German storyteller, source for the fairy tales of the Brothers Grimm.
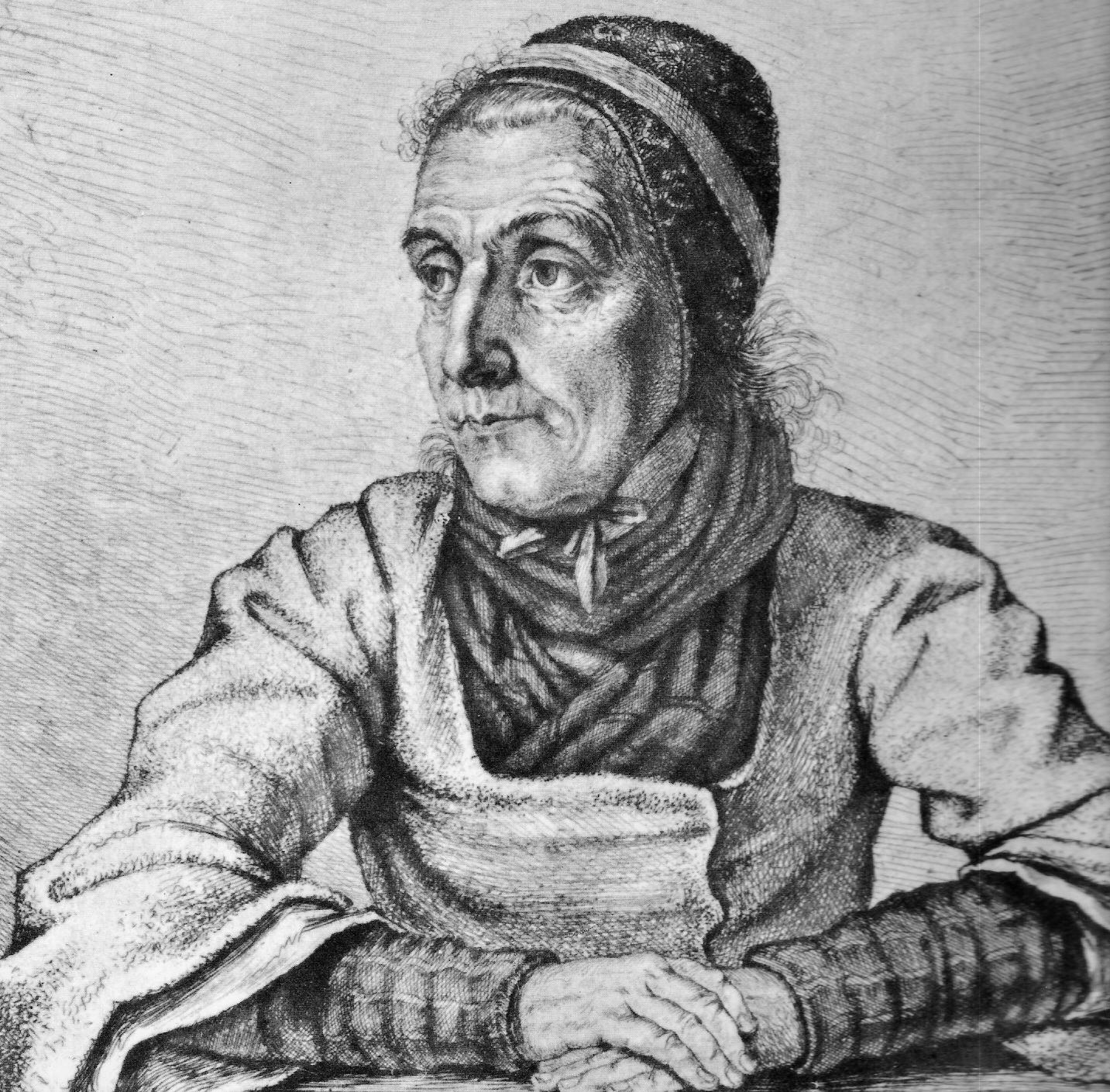
  Dorothea Viehmann
- Louise von François (1817–1893), Prussian novelist, member of the Huguenot nobility-descended von François family. Key work: The Last Lady of Reckenburg.
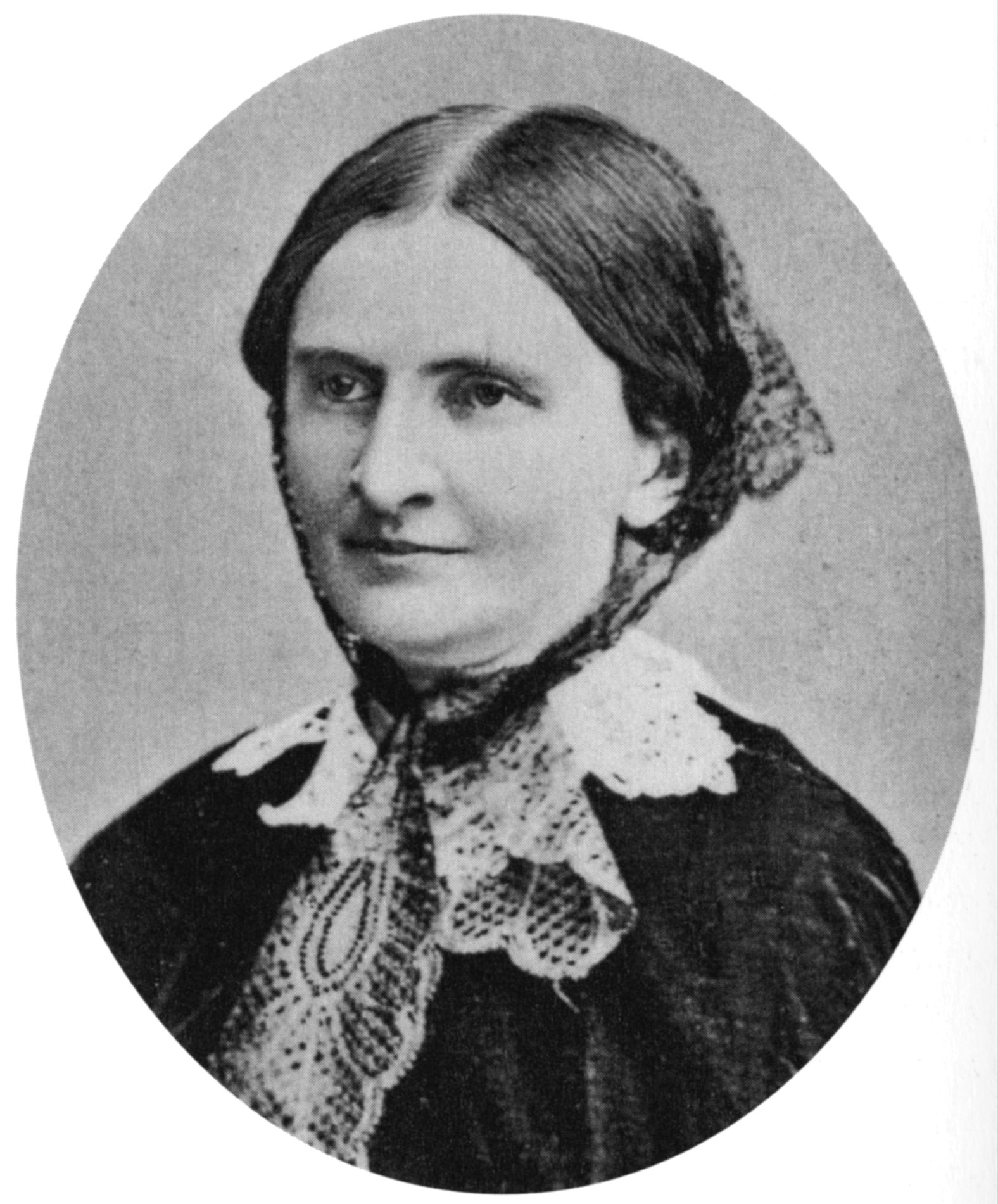
  Louise von François
- Gertrud von le Fort (1876–1971), German writer.
- Malwida von Meysenbug (1816–1903), German writer, Nobel Prize for Literature nominee. Key work: Memories of an Idealist.
- Ernst von Salomon (1902–1972), novelist, screenwriter, Freikorps fighter, far-right figure.
- Evelyn Waugh (1903–1966), author, Roman Catholic with Huguenot ancestry.
- Edith Wharton (1862–1937), American novelist, had a Huguenot great-great-grandfather, who came from the French Palatinate to participate in the founding of New Rochelle. Key work:Age of Innocence.
- John Greenleaf Whittier (1807–1892), American poet and advocate of the abolition of slavery.
- Laura Ingalls Wilder (1867–1957), American writer. Key work: Little House on the Prairie.
- Rose Wilder Lane (1886–1968), American writer and libertarian, daughter of Laura Ingalls Wilder. Key work: Let the Hurricane Roar (later retitled Young Pioneers).
- Tennessee Williams (real name Thomas Lanier Williams) (1911–1983), American playwright, descended from the Sevier family. Key work: A Streetcar Named Desire.
- Mary Wollstonecraft (1759–1797), English writer. Key work: Maria: or, The Wrongs of Woman.

== Other ==
- Sophie Blanchard (1778–1819), female hot air balloon pioneer, aeronautics advisor to Napoleon Bonaparte, first woman to die in an aviation disaster.
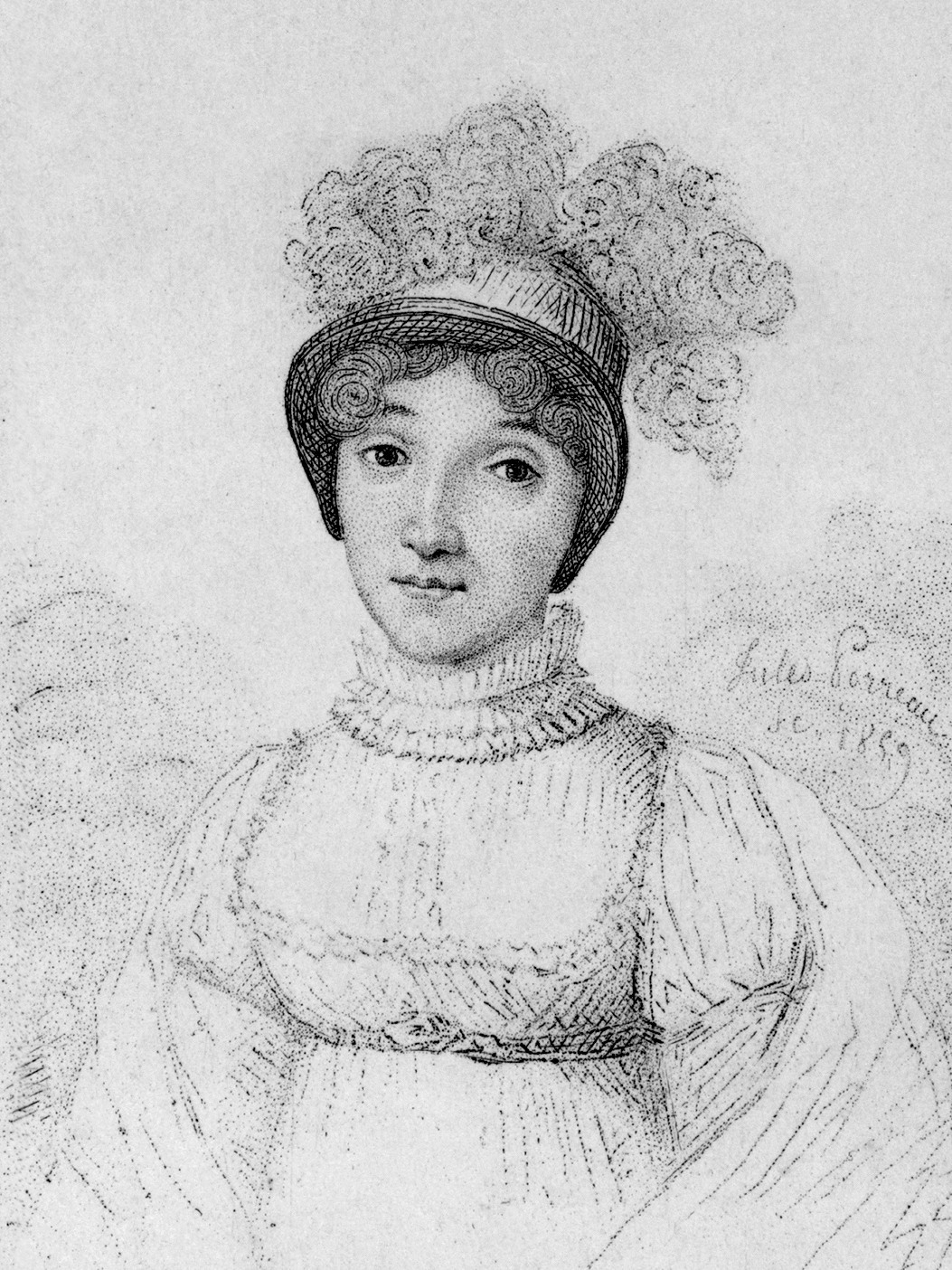
  Sophie Blanchard
- Idelette Calvin (1506–1549), wife of Jean Calvin.
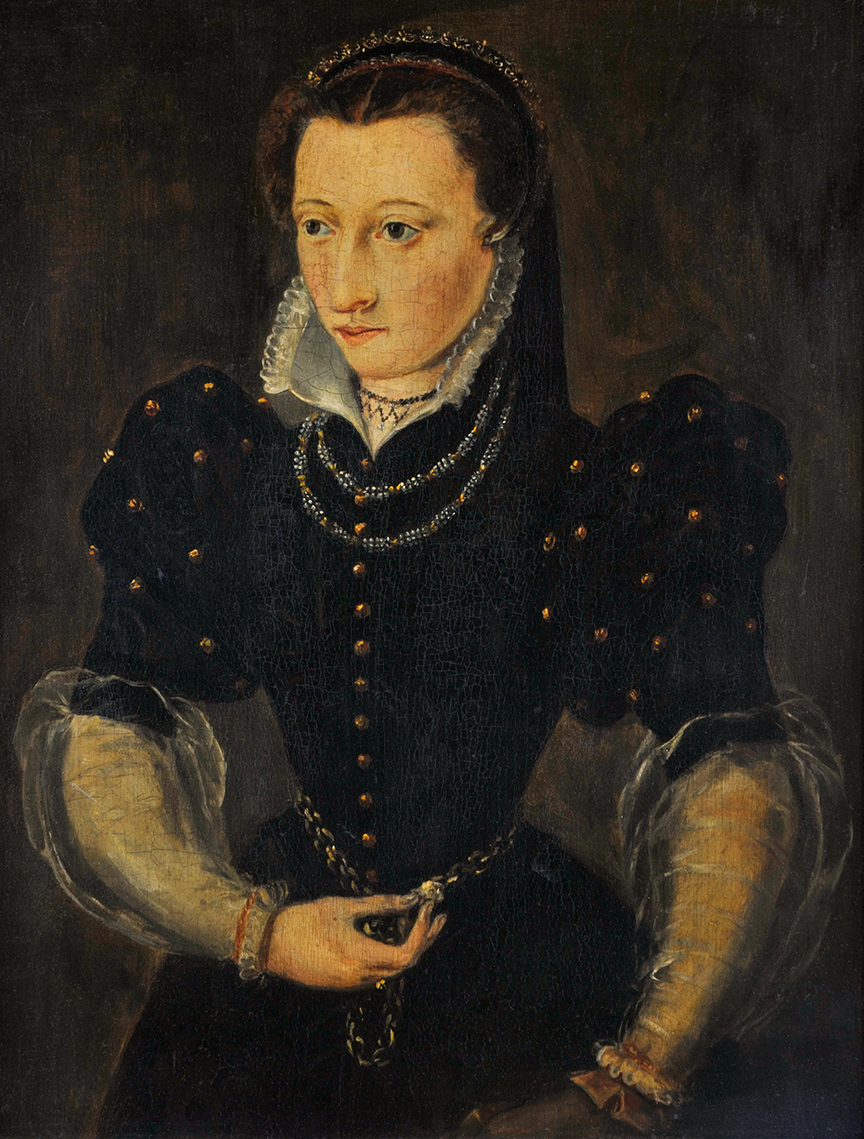
  Idelette Calvin
- Valentin Conrart (1603–1675), secretary to the King and man of letters.
- Countess Elisabeth of Nassau, French-Dutch noblewoman.
- John Debrett (1753–1822), publisher, founder of Debrett's, a compiler of reference books on the peerage, etiquette, lists of influential people and so forth, son of Jean Louys de Bret, a cook with Huguenot ancestry.
- Marie de La Tour d'Auvergne (1601–1665), French noblewoman.
- Charlotte de Laval (1530–1568), noblewoman, wife of Gaspard de Coligny.
- Alfred Dupont, draper.
- Charles J. Guiteau (1841–1882), US presidential assassin.
- Camille Seydoux (1982–), fashion stylist, sister of Léa Seydoux.
