= Gounelle =

Gounelle is a French surname. Notable people with the surname include:

- André Gounelle (1933–2025), French Protestant theologian, pastor, and academic
- Eugène Gounelle, French engineer, father of the entomologist
- fr:Laurent Gounelle, author of L'homme qui voulait être heureux
- Matthieu Gounelle (born 1971), curator of meteorites at Museum National d'Histoire Naturelle in Paris
  - 6948 Gounelle, asteroid
- Pierre-Émile Gounelle (1850–1914), French entomologist
- Rémi Gounelle (born 1967), French Protestant theologian
