= Pierre Courthial =

French pastor and theologian (1914-2009)

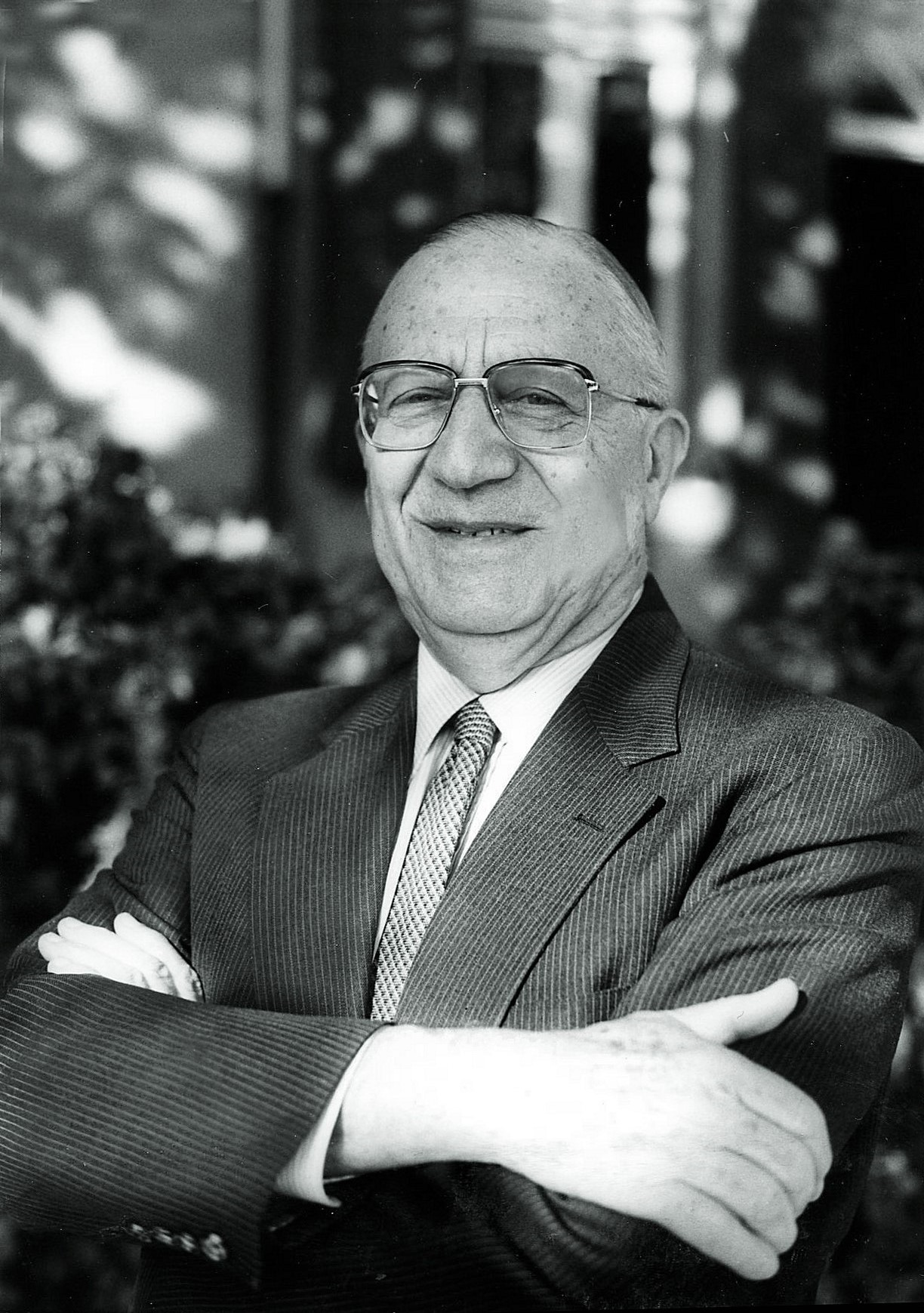
- Photo from Aix-en-Provence Seminary
- Born: August 12, 1914
- Died: April 23, 2009 (aged 94)
- Occupations: Pastor, Professor, Theologian
- Spouse: Hélène Jouve

Pierre Courthial (1914–2009) was a French pastor and Reformed Church (Calvinist) theologian. His pastoral career was spent in Lyon, La Voulte-sur-Rhône, and Paris. He helped establish theological study centres in France, and in later life completed two volumes of theological writing.

== Early life ==
Pierre Courthial was born in Saint-Cyr-au-Mont-d'Or, France, August 1914. His father was a businessman and was Protestant; his mother was Catholic. At sixteen, Courthial read works by John Calvin and his colleague, Pierre Viret. These writings established a theological foundation for his studies that continued throughout his lifetime.

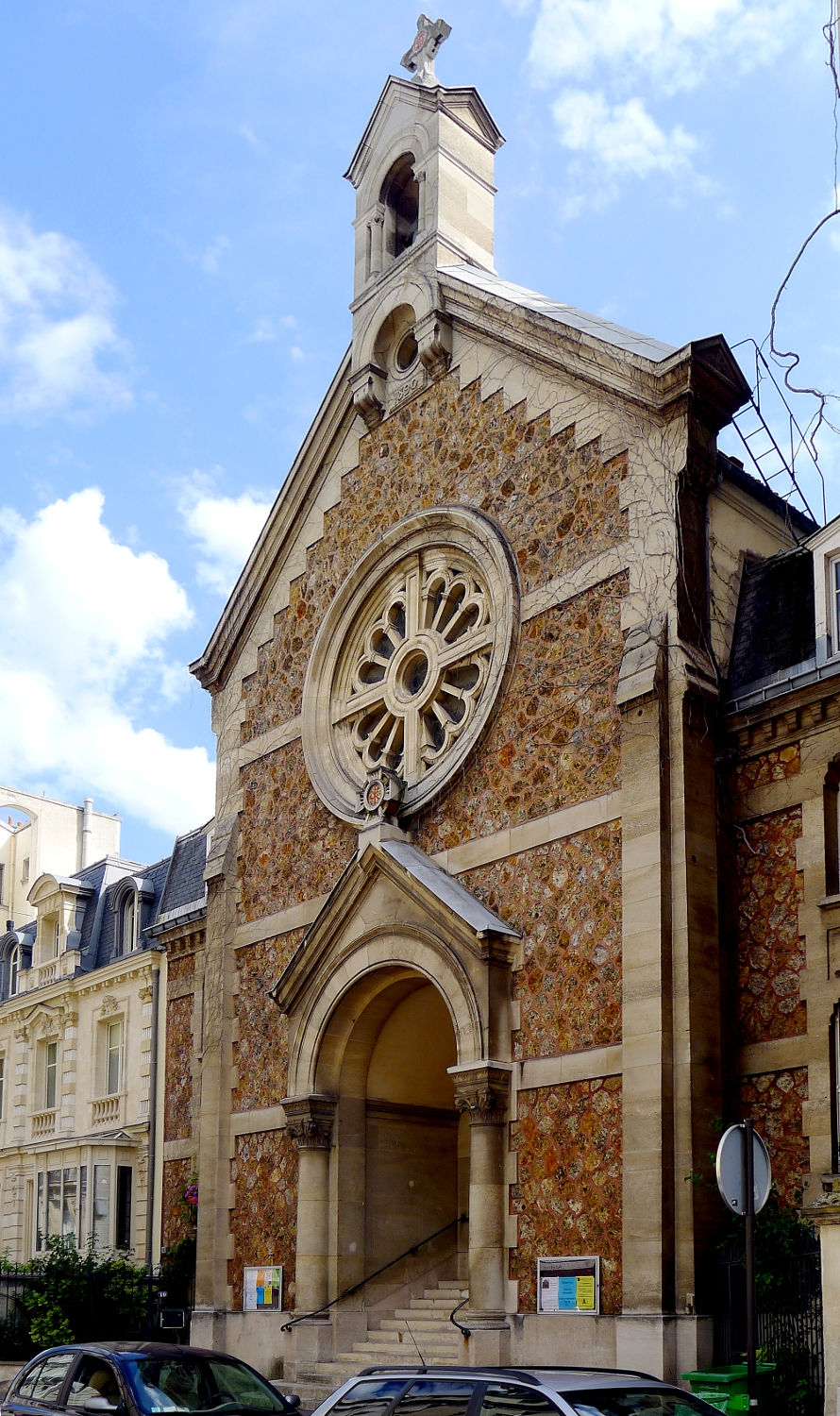
Temple de Passy-Annonciation, 19 rue Cortambert, Paris XVI

== Education ==
Courthial began studying business, but after only one year he decided to pursue theology. He studied formally at the Protestant Faculty of Theology in Paris from 1932 to 1936, where he learned from Reformed theologian Auguste Lecerf. After completing his studies at the university, he returned to stay with his family until he was awarded a scholarship to begin doctoral work at the Free University of Amsterdam. However, his plans were interrupted when the Protestant Church in Lyon asked him to pastor the church for one year until their new minister was able to arrive. As it turns out, Courthial never continued his studies, but worked as a pastor for much of the rest of his life.

== Ministry ==
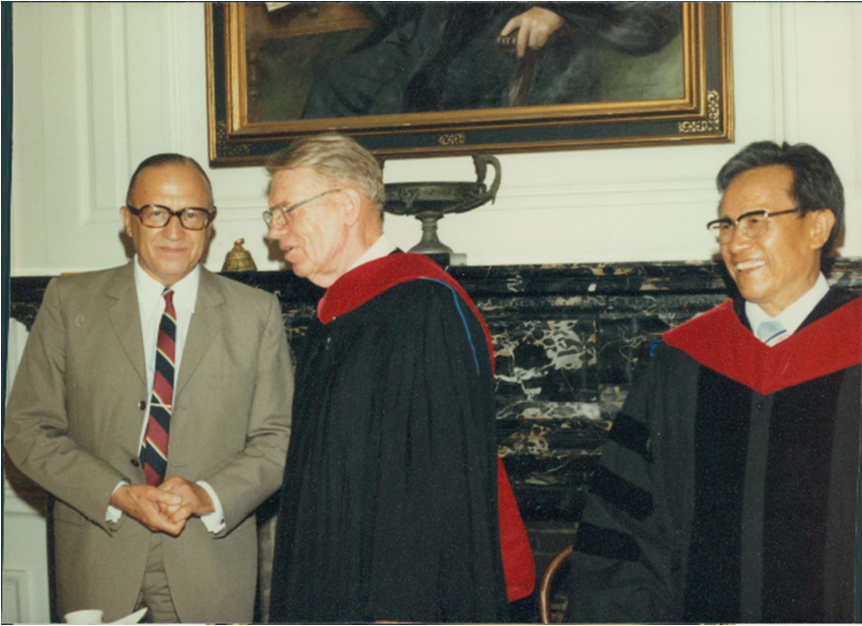
Courthial receives honorary doctorate, Westminster Seminary, 1979

During his pastoral ministry, Courthial studied Scripture and Reformed theology. Despite being firmly centered in Reformed doctrine, he strongly upheld ecumenism and found this to be centered on the four grand dogmas of the Church: the dogmas of the Trinity, the Incarnation, salvation by grace, and the authority of Scripture.

A year after he became a pastor in Lyon in 1937, he was sent as a delegate to the Synod at Lyon, which decided to reestablish the Reformed Church of France.

When in 1941 Courthial was named pastor of a Reformed parish in La Voulte-sur-Rhône, he befriended an orthodox theologian; the two met often to read and discuss the Church Fathers. It was during this time Courthial learned much about modern orthodox theologians.

During his time at L’Église Réformée de l’Annonciation in Paris (1951–74), Courthial continued to study theology diligently, dedicating significant time to sermon preparation, all while caring for his congregation. He served there for twenty-three years. In addition to his pastoral work, Courthial served as co-editor of La Revue réformée, for which he also contributed articles. He served on several missions and educational boards and in 1967 formed the Center of Evangelical Theological Studies.

In the 1970s Courthial expanded his personal studies to translate works from well-known Dutch theologians into English, and he translated the works of many respected Americans as well. Thus began his concentration on the significance of what he called “tota scriptura” (he preferred this term to “sola scriptura”), which is the application of God’s word to every area of life. This eventually led to a line of theology that would come to be known as “the ecumenism of Athanasius”, which is the application of Scripture to all aspects of life, or the ecumenism of those who live and work “against the world” as Athanasius did.

== Reformed Seminary at Aix-en-Provence ==
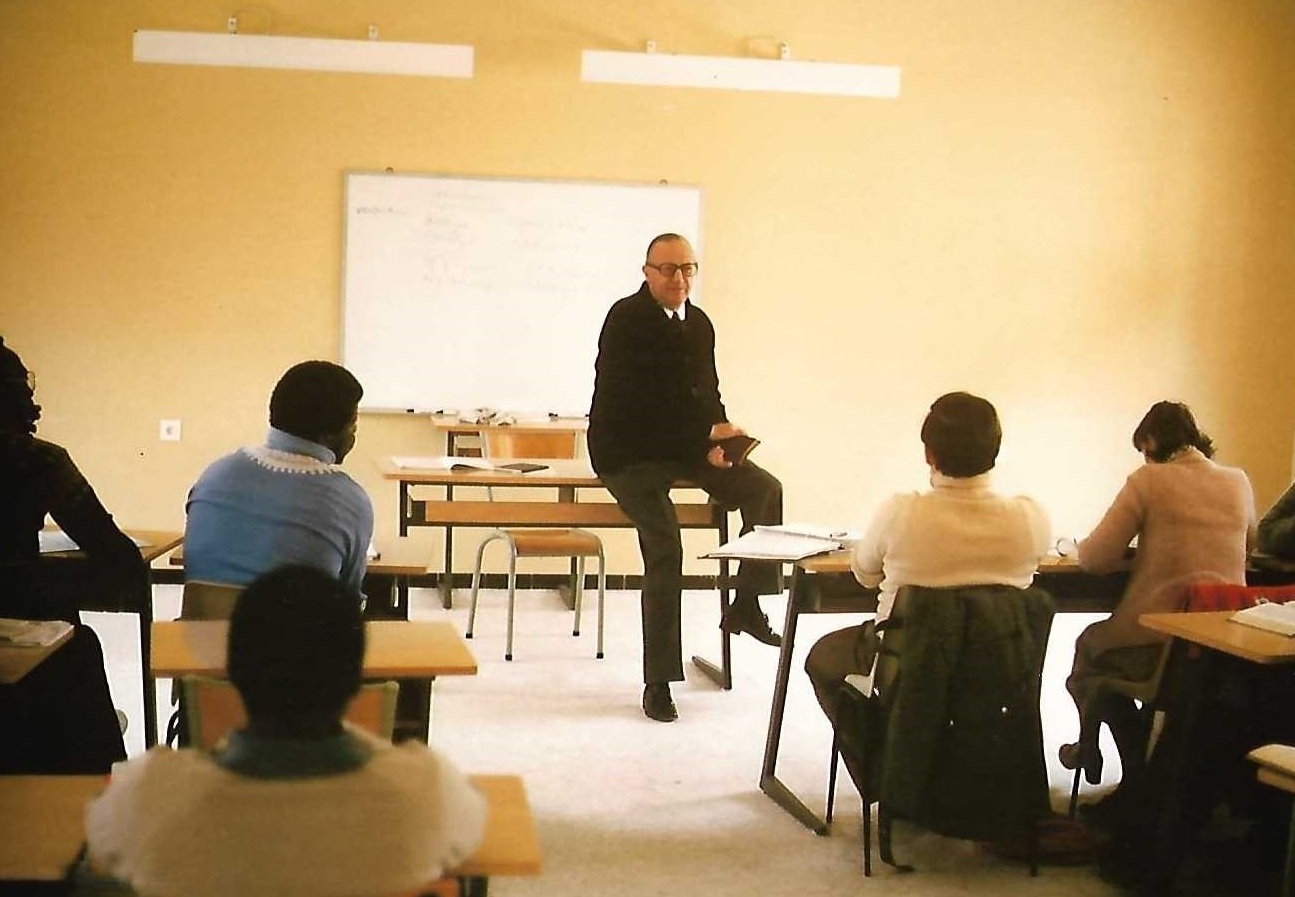
Pierre Courthial giving a course to the Faculté Libre de Théologie Réformée, Aix-en-Provence (1981)

In 1973, Courthial helped found a faculty of Protestant Reformed theology in Aix-en-Provence. Paul Wells, Eugene Boyer, Pierre Filhol, and Peter Jones all visited him and asked him to join them. He accepted their invitation, moving to Aix-en-Provence, where he served as the first dean at the Free Faculty of Reformed Theology and taught apologetics and practical theology until his retirement in 1984. He lived at 33 Avenue Jules Ferry from 1974 to 1984. William Edgar (now a professor at Westminster Theological Seminary, Philadelphia) and Pierre Berthoud (who succeeded him as dean) also joined the faculty. During these years Courthial traveled to South Africa, the United States, and Canada. In September 1979, he traveled to Philadelphia at the invitation of Westminster Theological Seminary to speak at their 50 year Jubilee, where he was one of four distinguished recipients chosen to receive Westminster’s first honorary doctorates.

== Theological works ==
After his retirement in 1984 Dr. Courthial applied himself to his two major writing projects, Le jour des petits recommencements (The day of small new beginnings), 1996, and De Bible en Bible (From Bible to Bible), 2001. Courthial undertook the first of these with the encouragement of his good friend in Switzerland, Jean-Marc Berthoud, brother of Pierre Berthoud. Courthial completed Le jour des petits recommencements at the age of 82. Over the course of the next ten years, until his death in 2009, Courthial stayed in contact with friends and theologians from his home in Paris. His theology was strongly influenced by John Calvin, Pierre Viret, August Lecerf, Pierre du Moulin, Blaise Pascal, Abraham Kuyper, John Murray, J. Gresham Machen, Cornelius van Til, Rousas John Rushdoony and others.

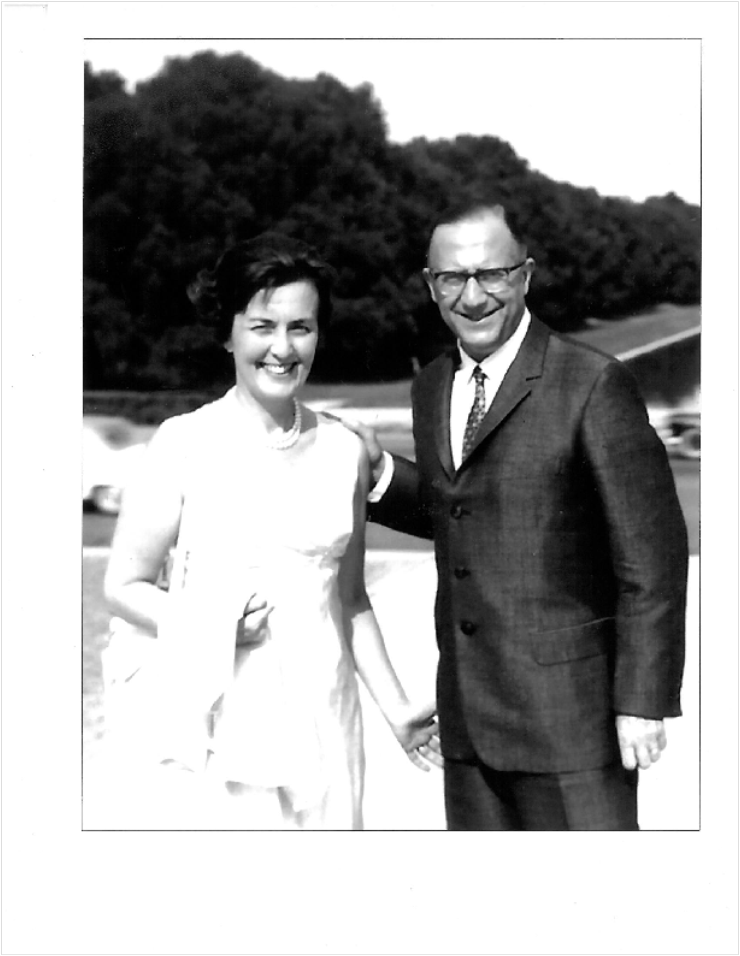
Pierre and Helene in D.C. 1966

== Death ==
Pierre Courthial died on April 23, 2009. He left behind his wife of sixty-seven years, Hélène, five children.

Group photographs

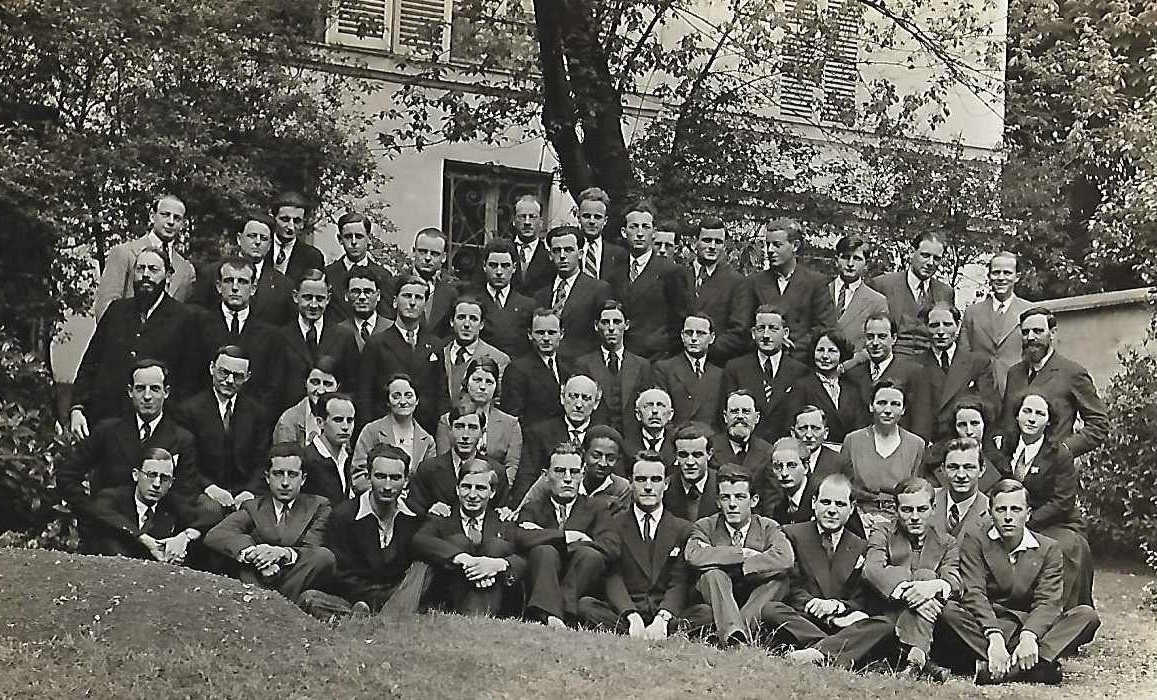
FACULTÉ de THÉOLOGIE de PARIS (1932/33 CLASS). Pierre Courthial: first row, far left. Pierre Marcel: fifth row, far left, light suit. Auguste Lecerf: third row, sixth from left.
