= Auguste Lecerf =

French neo-Calvinist theologian (1872–1943)

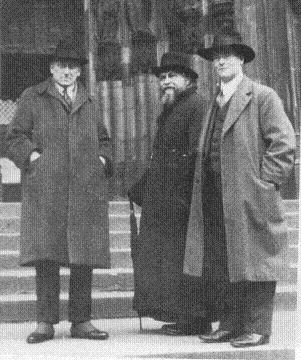
Auguste Lecerf (left), Sergius Bulgakov and Fritz Lieb (right)

Auguste Lecerf (1872–1943) was a French Reformed pastor of the Église réformée de France (Reformed Church of France) and a partly autodidact neo-Calvinist theologian. From 1927 onwards, he was dogmatics professor at the Protestant Faculty of Theology in Paris. As a specialist in Jean Calvin, he authored several books and articles on Reformed dogmatics.

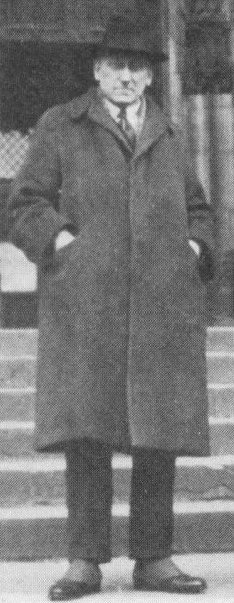

== Early life ==
Auguste Lecerf was born in London on September 18, 1872, to communards anti-clerical and agnostic parents who had sought refuge in England at the end of the Paris Commune in 1871. At the age of 12, He was religiously awakened in an Evangelical Sunday School in London. Later he converted to Protestantism at age 17 after reading Romans and Calvin's Institutes of the Christian Religion. He was then baptized at 17.

== Influence ==
One of the first traces of reformational scholarship [in France] can be found in the writings of Auguste Lecerf. The third chapter of his famous Introduction à la dogmatique réformée (Lecerf, 1938) deals with "Calvinism and philosophy". There the reader may be surprised to discover that long before Dooyeweerd lectured in France, Lecerf (1938: 41) mentions "les philosophes réformés Dooyeweerd et Vollenhoven" and shows familiarity with their ideas. Even more surprising is the fact that he discussed the two reformational philosophers before 1938, in a series of scattered articles which were published posthumous with the title Calvinist studies (Lecerf, 1949). Those studies were the object of intense dialogue with the famous French philosopher Étienne Gilson (1884–1978) who argued with Lecerf from a Roman Catholic point of view, in his Christianity and philosophy (Gilson, 1936). With this, reformational thinking was brought to the attention of the "top level" philosophers of France. He was a major influence on two other key French Reformed theologians Pierre-Charles Marcel and Pierre Courthial. It was Lecerf who encouraged Pierre Marcel to study Herman Dooyeweerd.

In France and French-speaking Switzerland, Auguste Lecerf's teaching and writing succeed in creating a whole new Calvinist movement within Protestantism. With his friend pastor Jacques Pannier, Auguste Lecerf launched the Calvinistic Society of France and he was the first editor of its Bulletin. He studied at the Faculty of Protestant Theology in Paris. His thesis was on determinism and responsibility in Calvin's system. He was involved in pastoral ministry for almost twenty years in Normandy and for four years was a military chaplain. In 1932 he returned to Paris to become a professor in the Protestant Faculty of Theology, University of Paris. He remained there until his death in 1943.

Lecerf was strongly influenced by Jonathan Edwards. He studied under Auguste Sabatier but turned away from that teacher's vague spirituality to write a thesis of his own on entitled: Determinism and Responsibility in Calvin's System, (1895).

His subsequent theological work is much influenced by Herman Bavinck and Dutch Neo-Calvinism.

Among his most influential followers are:

- French pastor Pierre-Charles Marcel (1910–1992) who launched in 1950 La Revue Réformée
- French pastor Pierre Courthial (1914–2009), leader of the evangelical wing of the Reformed churches in France, from the evangelical theology seminar of Aix-en-Provence
- André Schlemmer (1890–1973), a French medical doctor with a strong Reformed church involvement, author of several books among which a collection of Auguste Lecerf's writings
- Geneva pastor Jean de Saussure (1899–1977) who in 1930 published a book called "A l'école de Calvin" reprocessing Auguste Lecerf's ideas

== Theological Works ==
Auguste Lecerf's work was translated into other languages, chiefly in English and didn't go unnoticed in American Reformed circles.

Among his chief works are:

- An Introduction to Reformed Dogmatics. (Translated into English by S. Leigh-Hunt [London: Lutterworth Press, 1949]) Original French title: Introduction à la dogmatique réformée, 1998, Kerygma, 560 pages
- Études Calvinistes (1949), 1999, Kerygma, 148 pages
- Catéchisme de Genève (1934)

Auguste Lecerf's Introduction to Reformed Dogmatics deals with the formal principle of the Reformation "the authority of scripture alone" in six chapters.

== Bibliography ==
- Pierre Courthial, La foi réformée La foi réformée en France, VBRU.
- Bernard Reymond, Le protestantisme et Calvin: que faire d'un aïeul si encombrant ? Publisher: Labor et Fides, 2008, 134 pages, ISBN 9782830912845
