= Van Dieren =

French Protestant publishing house

Van Dieren or Van Dieren Éditeur is a French Protestant publishing house, Francophone and independent, founded in 1995 and located in Paris. Specializing in Liberal Christianity, this house also publishes art books and literature.

== Authors ==
- Laurent Gagnebin
- André Gounelle
- Rémi Gounelle
- Raphaël Picon
- Bernard Reymond
- Friedrich Schleiermacher
- Ernst Troeltsch
