= Laurent Gagnebin =

Laurent Gagnebin is a philosopher and Protestant theologian born in Lausanne in 1939. He has been pastor of the Reformed Church of France in Paris in the Liberal Protestant congregations of the Oratory of the Louvre and the Temple protestant du Foyer de l'Âme from 1963 to 1981 and professor of practical theology at the Protestant Faculty of Theology in Paris.

== Works ==
- 1961: André Gide nous interroge (Cahiers de la Renaissance vaudoise, Lausanne).
- 1963: Albert Camus dans sa lumière (Cahiers de la Renaissance Vaudoise, Lausanne).
- 1968: Simone de Beauvoir ou le refus de l'indifférence (Fischbacher).
- 1971: Quel Dieu ? (L'Âge d'homme).
- 1972: Connaître Sartre (Editions Resma-Centurion).
- 1978: Silence de Dieu-Parole humaine, le problème de la démythologisation (L'Âge d'Homme, Lausanne; collection "Alethina").
- 1987: Du Golgotha à Guernica: Foi et création artistique (Paris, les Bergers et les mages).
- 1987: Christianisme spirituel et christianisme social, la prédication de Wilfred Monod" (Genève, Labor et Fides).
- 1992: Le culte à chœur ouvert (Paris/Genève, Les Bergers et les Mages/Labor et Fides).
- 1994: Nicolas Berdiaeff ou de la destination créatrice de l'homme (L'Âge d'Homme, Lausanne).
- 1996: Pour un christianisme en fêtes (Paris, Église réformée de la Bastille).
- 1997: Le protestantisme (Paris, Flammarion (Dominos 122))
- 1999: Albert Schweitzer (Paris, Desclée de Brouwer)
- 2005: Le protestantisme, la foi insoumise (en collaboration avec Raphaël Picon) (Paris, Flammarion (champs 591))
- 2006: Le protestantisme: ce qu'il est, ce qu'il n'est pas (7e éd.)(Carrières-sous-Poissy, La Cause)
- 2006: La bénédiction du mariage (collection Edifier et Former, Edition Olivétan)
- 2009: L'athéisme nous interroge (Beauvoir, Camus, Gide, Sartre), éd. Van Dieren, Read online
