= Pierre-Charles Marcel =

== Biography ==
Pierre-Charles Marcel (1910–1992) was a leading French Reformed Protestant Christian pastor and philosopher who studied under France's leading evangelical-confessional mind, M. Auguste Lecerf (1873–1943). Marcel was sent to the Netherlands by Lecerf to study Christian philosophy under Herman Dooyeweerd.

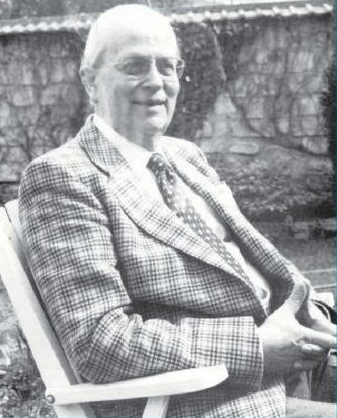
Pastor Pierre-Charles Marcel

His ultimate aim was to translate the Dutchman’s magnum opus – Reformatorische wijsbegeerte – into French for the benefit of French-speaking Christians.

Other duties, and a world war, ultimately scuppered this plan and, when an American translation of the massive three volume work was eventually published in the 1950s, Marcel abandoned his initial plan.

During the fifties, however, he undertook a study of Dooyeweerd in two degree courses and produced what amounts to a brilliant summary in French of the Dutchman’s great work.

Pierre-Charles Marcel also became the president of la Société Calviniste de France and was active in the International Association for Reformed Faith and Action (IARFA). He was a pastor in l'Église réformée de France. Two "Treatises" on early works of Herman Dooyeweerd (1894–1977) by Pierre-Charles Marcel, translated from the original unpublished French typescripts circa 1956, will appear for the first time as printed books in the French language, while translations of the French into English are planned for publication over the next two or three years. Colin Wright is the translator and redactor of the two forthcoming English editions.

Pierre Charles Marcel was Pastor of the Reformed Church l'Eglise Réformée de France at St. Germain-en-Laye, near Paris for about 50 years.

He was for a while the secretary of the French Bible Society. In 1950 he founded La Revue Réformée and was its editor. After his death, Paul Wells took over editorship. Marcel was also an associate professor at Faculté Libre de Théologie Réformée d'Aix-en-Provence.

He retired in 1969.

== Theological works ==
He wrote two works on Dooyeweerd's philosophy. These have been translated into English by Colin Wright. Wright writes:

"The first thesis: The Transcendental Critique of Theoretical Thought: Prolegomena to Herman Dooyeweerd's Philosophy of the Law-Idea, was completed in 1956. For this he was awarded the Licencié en Théologie at the Faculté Libre de Theologie Protestante in Montpellier. He is the author of The Biblical Doctrine of Infant Baptism, Sacrament of the Covenant of Grace, and The Relevance of Preaching.

The second volume provides an analysis of Dooyeweerd’s positive philosophy based on explicit presuppositions, those of Christianity. Dooyeweerd analyzes reality in the light of the framework of laws of thought embedded in the mind and in extant reality. The result is an audacious synthesis that provides a foundation for justified reason."

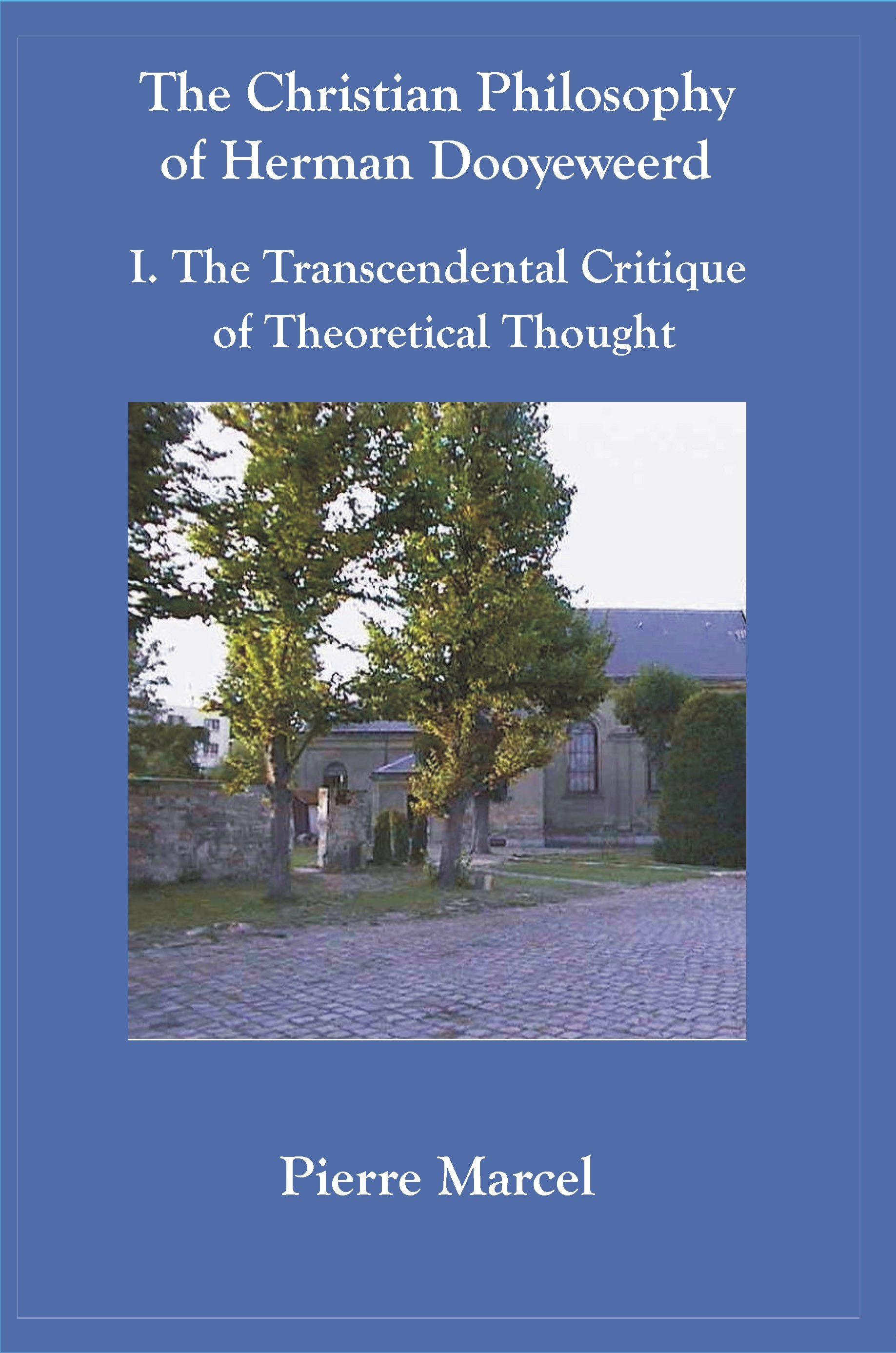
THE TRANSCENDENTAL CRITIQUE OF THEORETICAL THOUGHT

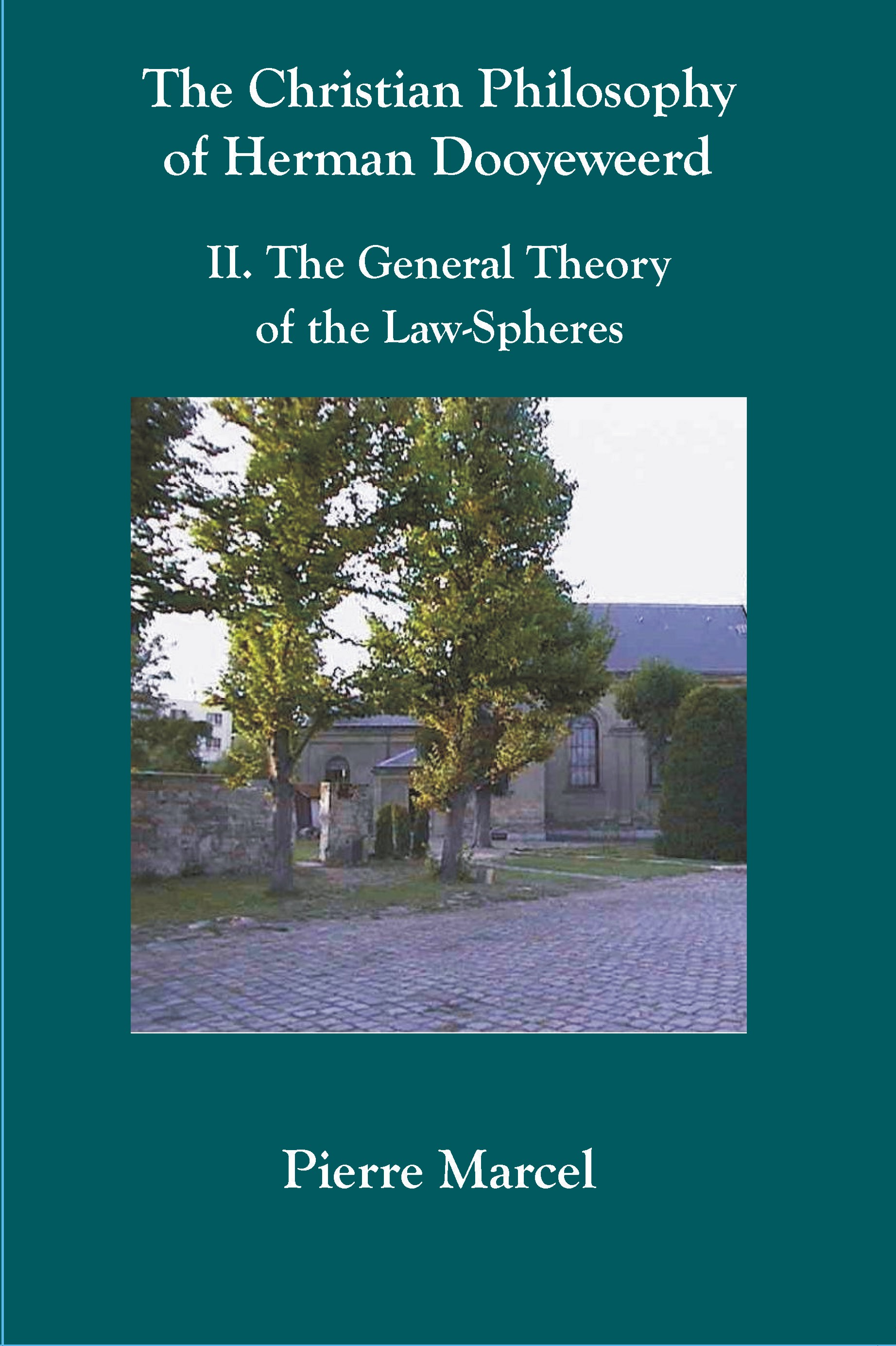
THE GENERAL THEORY OF THE LAW-SPHERES

Articles from La Revue Réformée

- Préface de Pierre MARCEL - n° 241 de 2007 La haine du monde de Pierre MARCEL - n° 198 de 1998

- La justification et la sanctification dans la pensée de calvin de Pierre MARCEL - n° 236 de 2006

- La Parole, le Baptême, la Sainte Cène – Le témoignage de la pensée réformée de Pierre MARCEL - n° 211 de 2001

- La tâche du Saint-Esprit de Pierre MARCEL - n° 199 de 1998

- Préface de Pierre MARCEL - n° 246 de 2008
