= Oratoire du Louvre =

- Temple protestant de l'Oratoire du Louvre
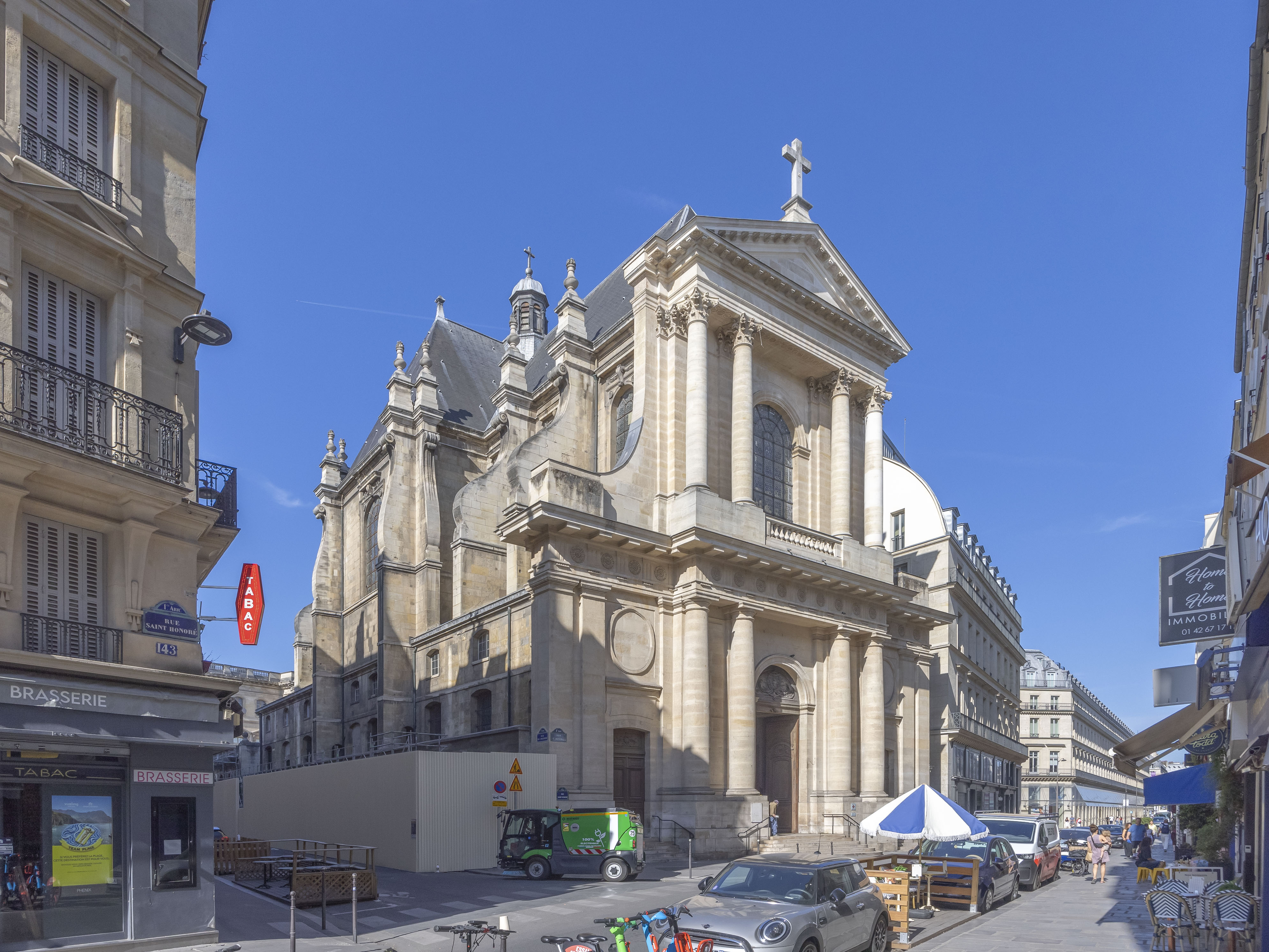
- Front of the church from rue Saint-Honoré

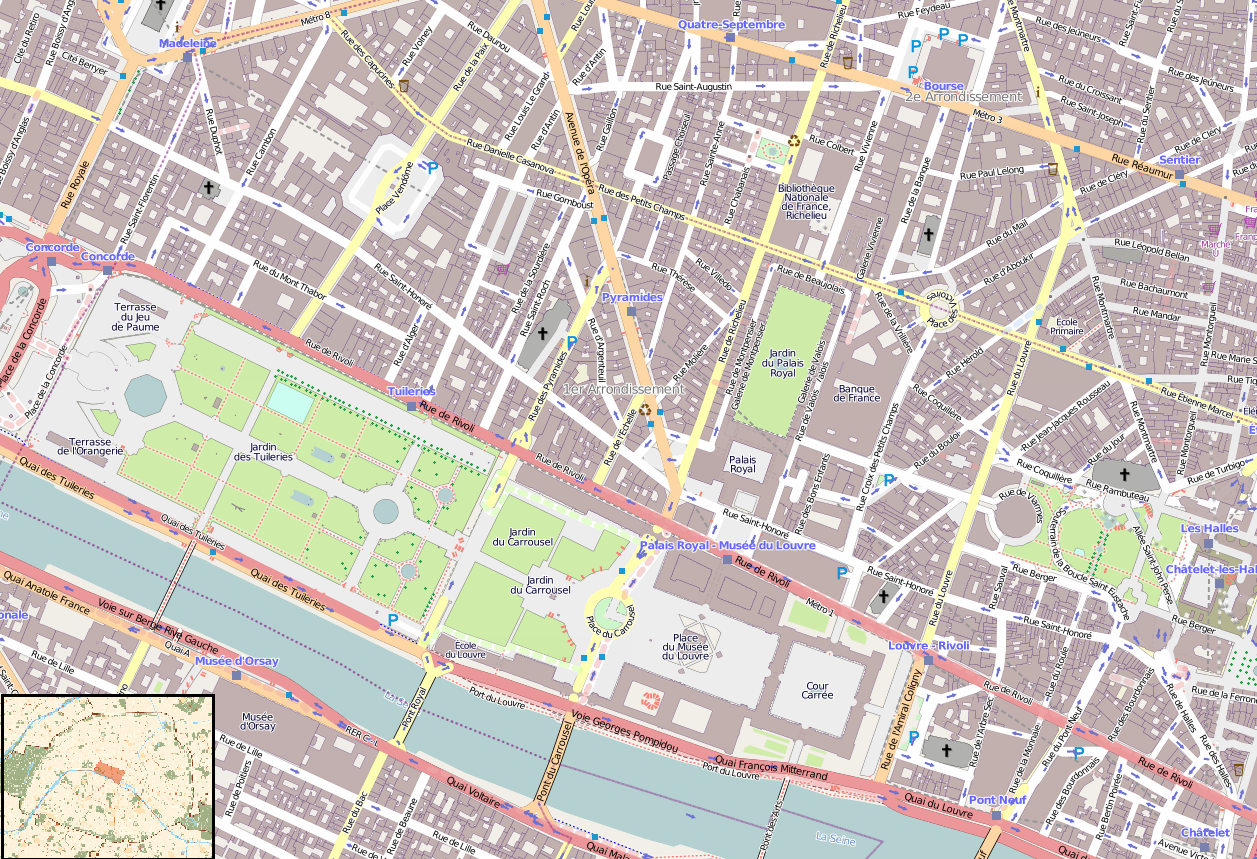
- The location of l'Oratoire within Paris
- 48°51′42.7″N 2°20′25.1″E
- Location: Paris
- Country: France
- Denomination: United Protestant Church of France
- Previous denomination: Roman Catholic
- Churchmanship: Liberal
- Website: oratoiredulouvre.fr

History
- Former name: La congrégation de l'Oratoire de Jésus
- Status: Parish church
- Founded: November 1611
- Founder: Pierre de Bérulle
- Consecrated: July 12, 1750
- Events: Made royal chapel of the Louvre Palace by Louis XIII (1623); suppressed during the French Revolution (1792); Protestant church (1811)

Architecture
- Functional status: Active
- Heritage designation: Monument Historique PA00085789
- Designated: 1907
- Architect(s): Jacques Lemercier, Clément Métezeau, Pierre Caqué
- Architectural type: Christian Church
- Style: Baroque
- Years built: 1621–1625, 1740–1745
- Groundbreaking: September 22, 1621
- Completed: 1745

Clergy
- Pastor(s): Agnès Adeline-Schaeffer; Béatrice Cléro-Mazire

The Église réformée de l'Oratoire du Louvre is a historic Protestant church located at 145 rue Saint-Honoré – 160 rue de Rivoli in the 1st arrondissement of Paris, across the street from the Louvre. It was founded as a Catholic church in 1611, became the royal chapel of France under Louis XIII, and then became a Protestant Church under Napoleon I in 1811. It is now a member of the United Protestant Church of France.

== Oratory church (1611-1621) ==
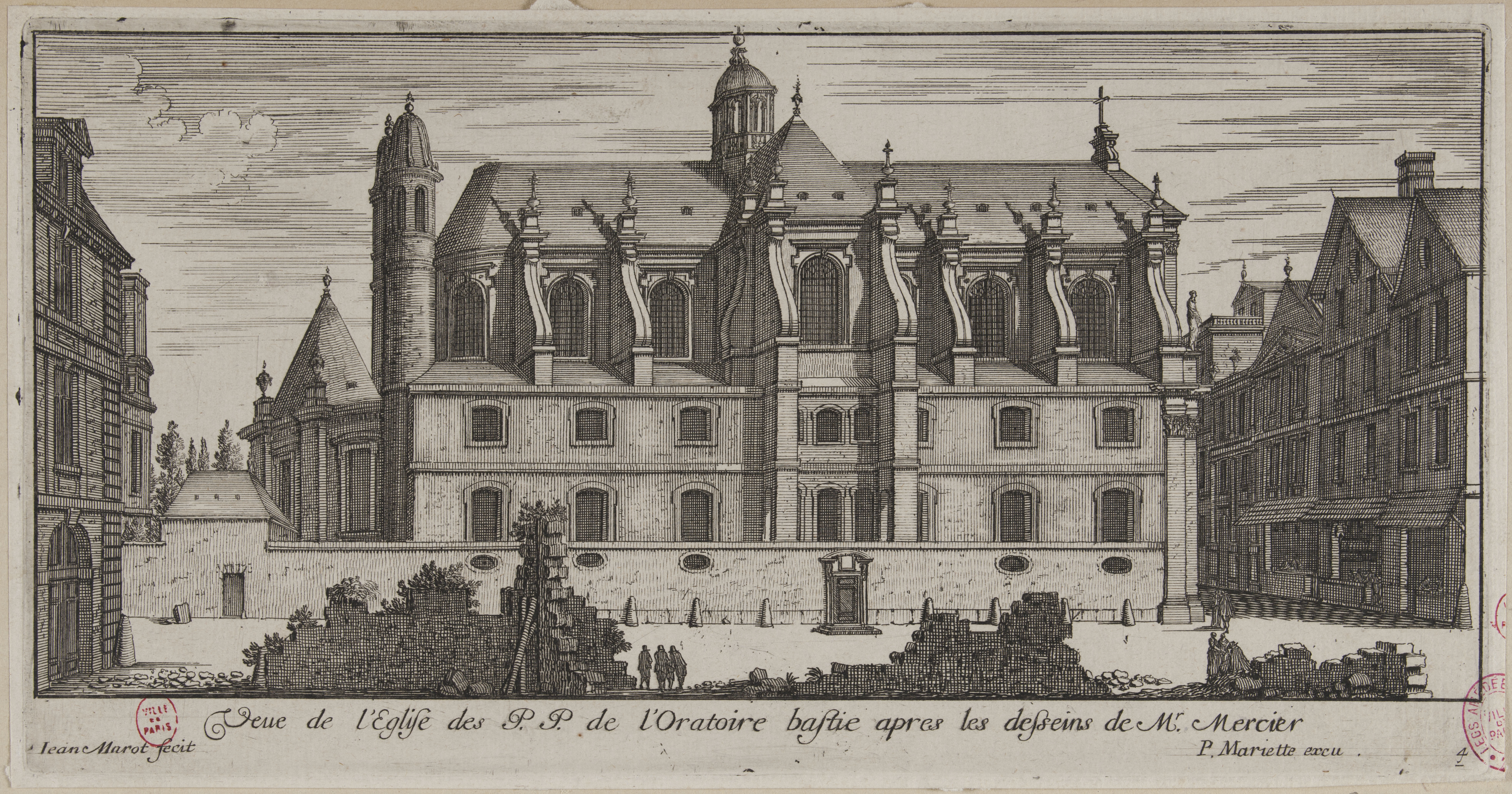
Oratory of the Louvre (late 17th c.)

The French Oratory was founded in 1611 by Cardinal Pierre de Bérulle, as the first Paris church of the Oratory of Jesus, an order of Catholic priests and brothers who lived together in a religious community without taking formal vows. In 1612 the French Regent, Marie de Medicis, officially recognized the Oratory. Pope Paul V recognized the Oratory in 1613. The Oratory grew until it had some sixty churches in France.

The first Paris church of the Oratory was in the Faubourg Saint-Jacques, close to the future Val de Grace church. As the congregation grew, de Bérulle began the search for a larger home for the Oratory. In 1616 de Bérulle bought a large former mansion on Rue de Marengo, near the Louvre and dedicated a chapel there. The new chapel attracted a large following, and de Bérulle began planning for an even larger church. In 1619 he bought several houses and parcels of land, and in 1620 bought large parcel of land at what is the present site, on the present Rue de l'Oratoire, next to the Louvre. At the end of 1620 he commissioned the royal architect Clément Métezeau to design the new church.

=== Royal Chapel (1621-1625) ===
The first stone was laid on 22 September 1621 by Hercule, Duke of Montbazon, the governor of Paris. King Louis XIII actively supported the church, giving it the status of the Royal Chapel, and gave the clergy the status of royal chaplains. The most prestigious artists of the time, Philippe de Champagne, Charles Le Brun and Simon Vouet participated in the decoration of the chapels. Most of their work was destroyed during the French Revolution, but some art remains. The church hosted the funerals of both the King and of Cardinal Richelieu, as well as Queens Anne of Austria and Maria Theresa of Spain. However, with changes of regime and financial difficulties, the construction of the he church was suspended in 1625.

=== Neoclassical additions (1741-1750) ===
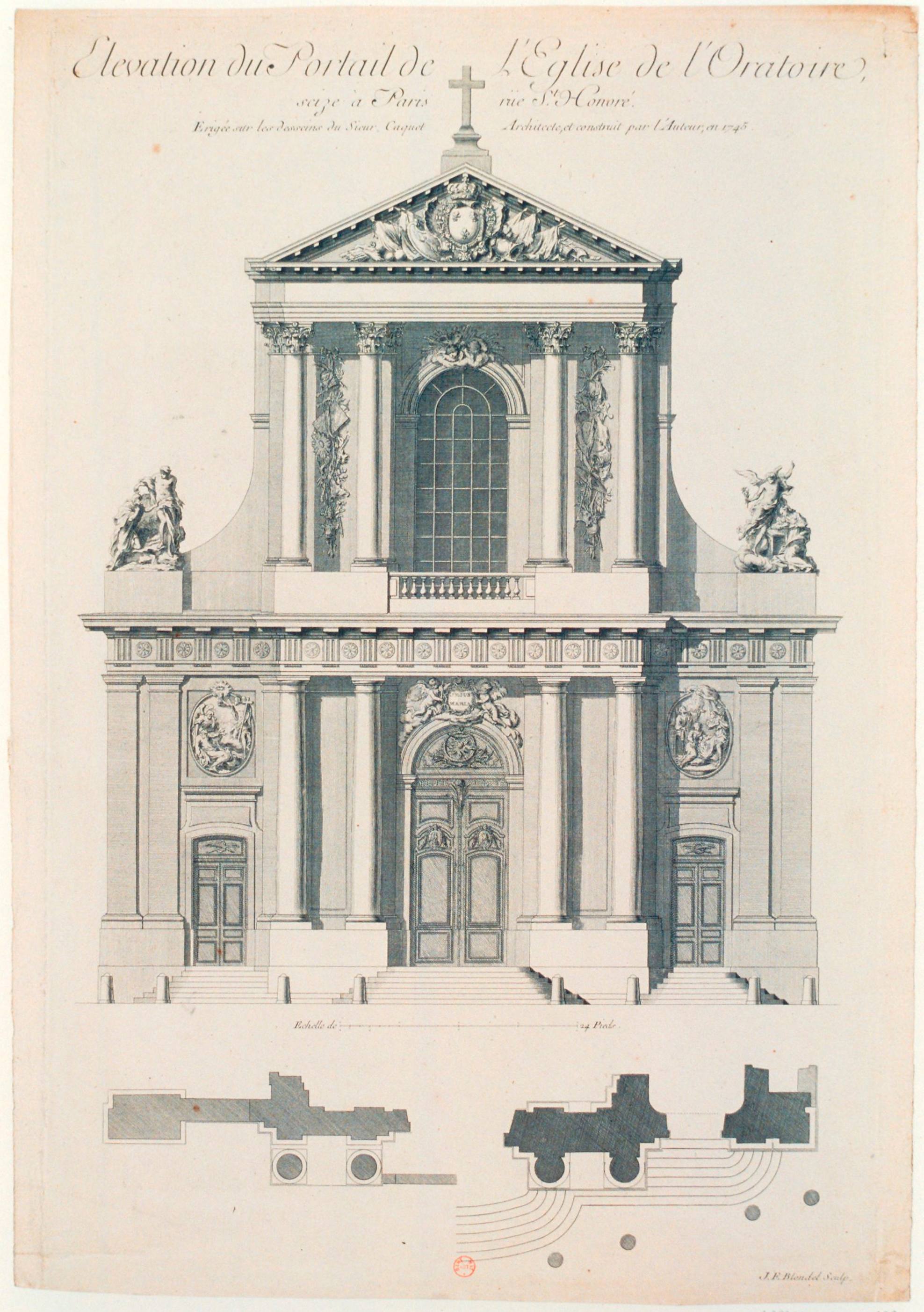
The Neoclassical facade of the Temple on rue Saint-Honoré (1744-46)

Construction of the unfinished church finally resumed 1741 under architect Pierre Caqué. He completed the last two traveres of the nave, built the Neoclassical facade on rue Saint-Honoré (1744-1746) and then redesigned the interior with a balance of the earlier Baroque architecture and the new neo-classical style. He commissioned classical sculptures from Claude-Clair Francin and Nicolas-Sebastien Adam to decorate the facade. In 1747 he finished the main altar and the baldequin. The interior was completed in 1748, and was consecrated in 1750.

=== Revolutionary meeting hall and Bank of France (1792 to 1811) ===
In 1792, during the French Revolution, the Revolutionary government formally abolished all religious orders, including the congregation of the Oratory. the church was closed, and was turned into a meeting place for the national academy of medicine, and also to store sets for the Paris Opera and the Comedie-Francaise. In 1793, as the Revolution became more radical and anti-clerical, the church was ransacked, the statues and architecture mutilated, and the chapels emptied of their art. Fortunately twenty-nine paintings from the church were sent for safekeeping to the Museum of French Monuments. As the Revolution came to an end, in 1800 the newly-created Bank of France was installed in the empty church building.

=== Protestant Temple (1811 to present) ===
In 1811, Napoleon gave the building to the Protestant congregation of Saint-Louis-du-Louvre whose own church building was demolished to make way for the expansion of the Louvre.

Between 1820 and 1828, the church was restored and modified by architect to adapt to Protestant services. A sacristy was created, An organ was installed, and tribunes were added in the chapels. In 1853, to make room for the Rue de Rivoli, one of the new streets cut through the center of the city by Baron Haussman, the convent of the old church was demolished. A statue and monument of Admiral Gaspard de Coligny, the prominent Huguenot leader of the 16th century, was raised on the rue de Rivoli end of the church in 1889.

The title "Oratory" of the Catholic was preserved in the Protestant church. August Decoppet, the pastor of the church from 1878 to 1906 explained, "Our church bears the most beautiful name that can be given to a church, that of "oratory", which signifies a house of prayer, a place where the human soul and God can come together."

== 20th and 21st century ==
The Paris church today is one of the most prominent temples of the Reformed Church of France. It is noted for its Religious liberalism.

== The exterior ==
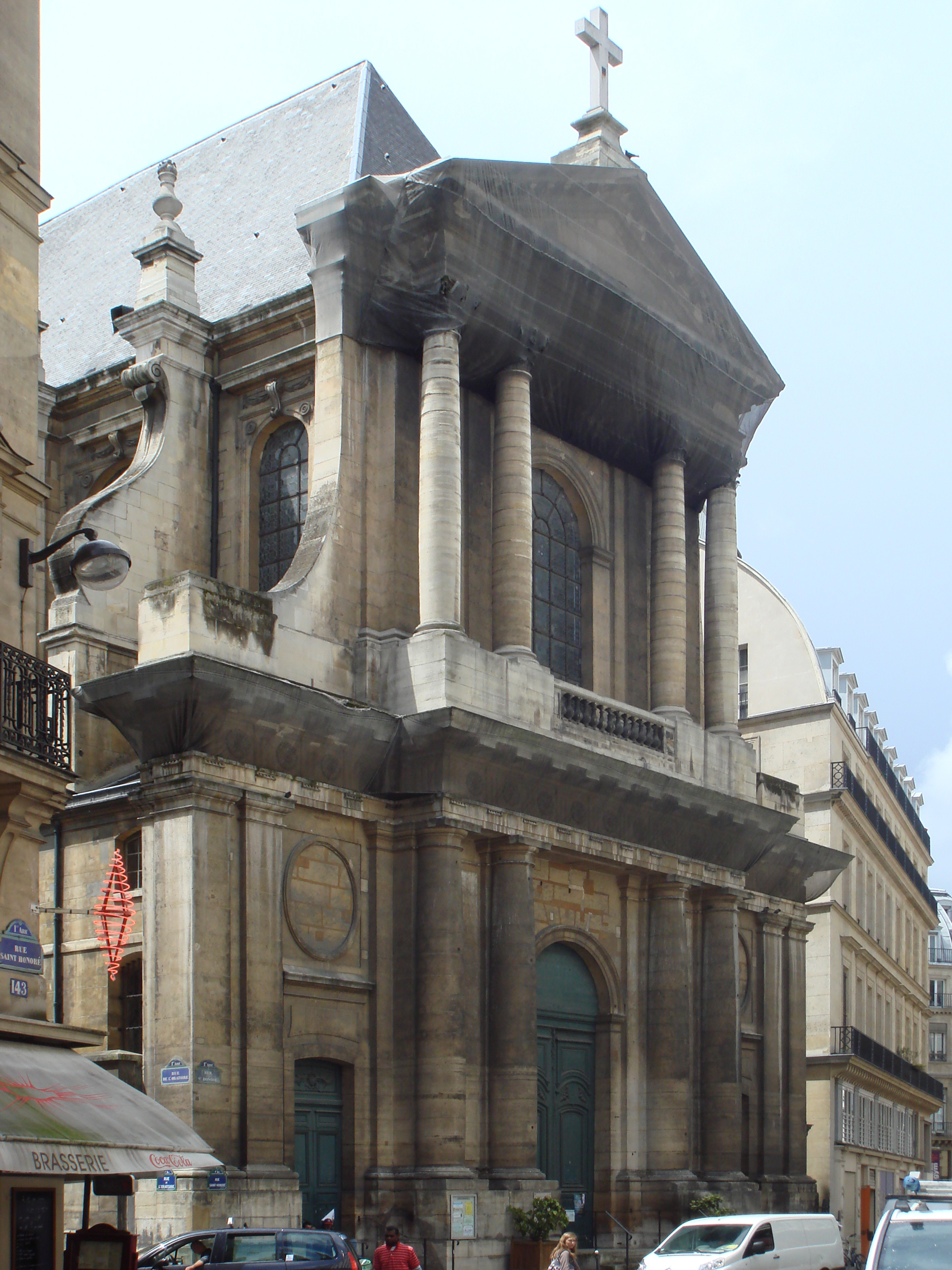
The classiscal facade on rue Saint-Honoré

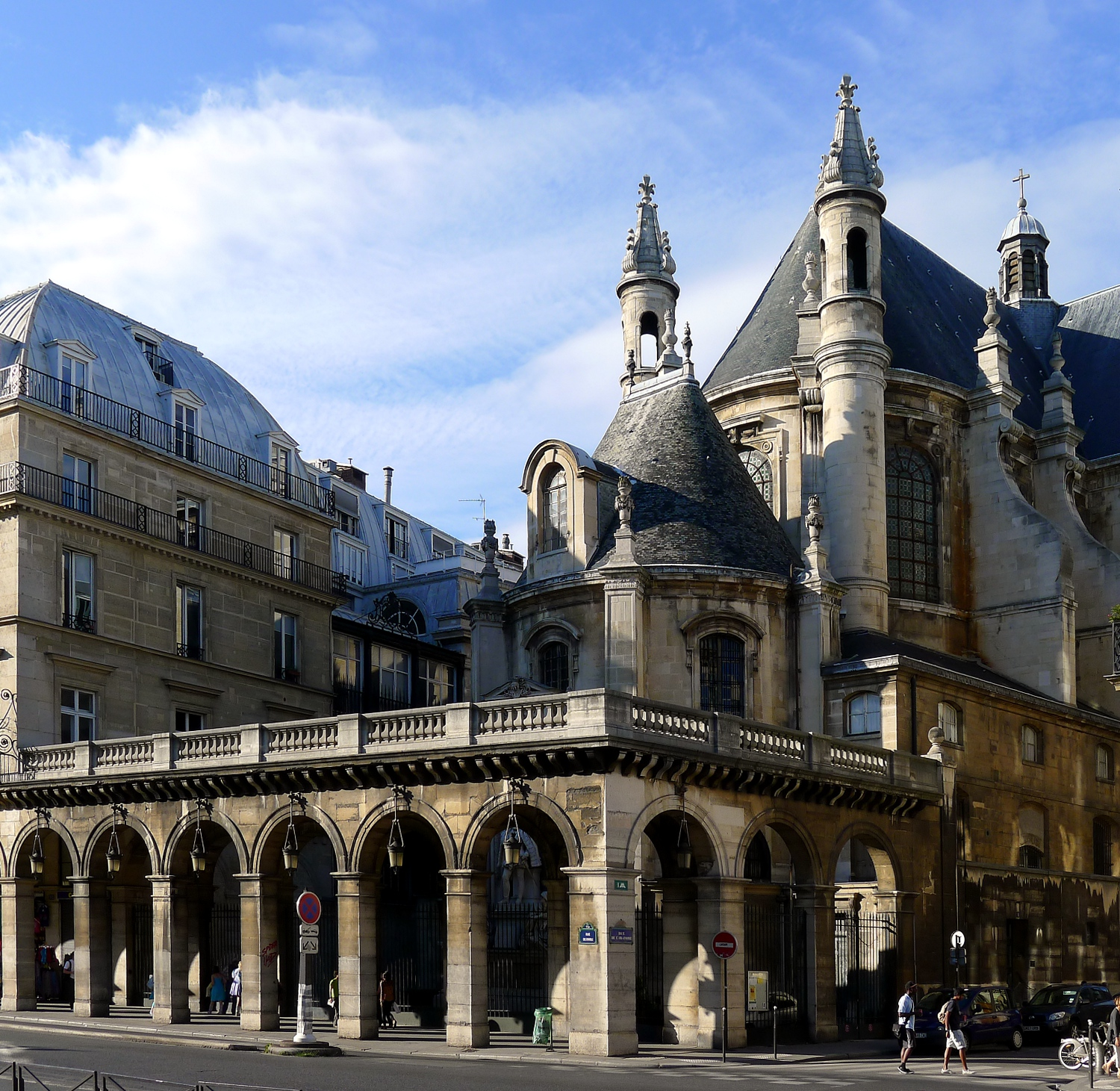
The church seen from Rue de Rivoli

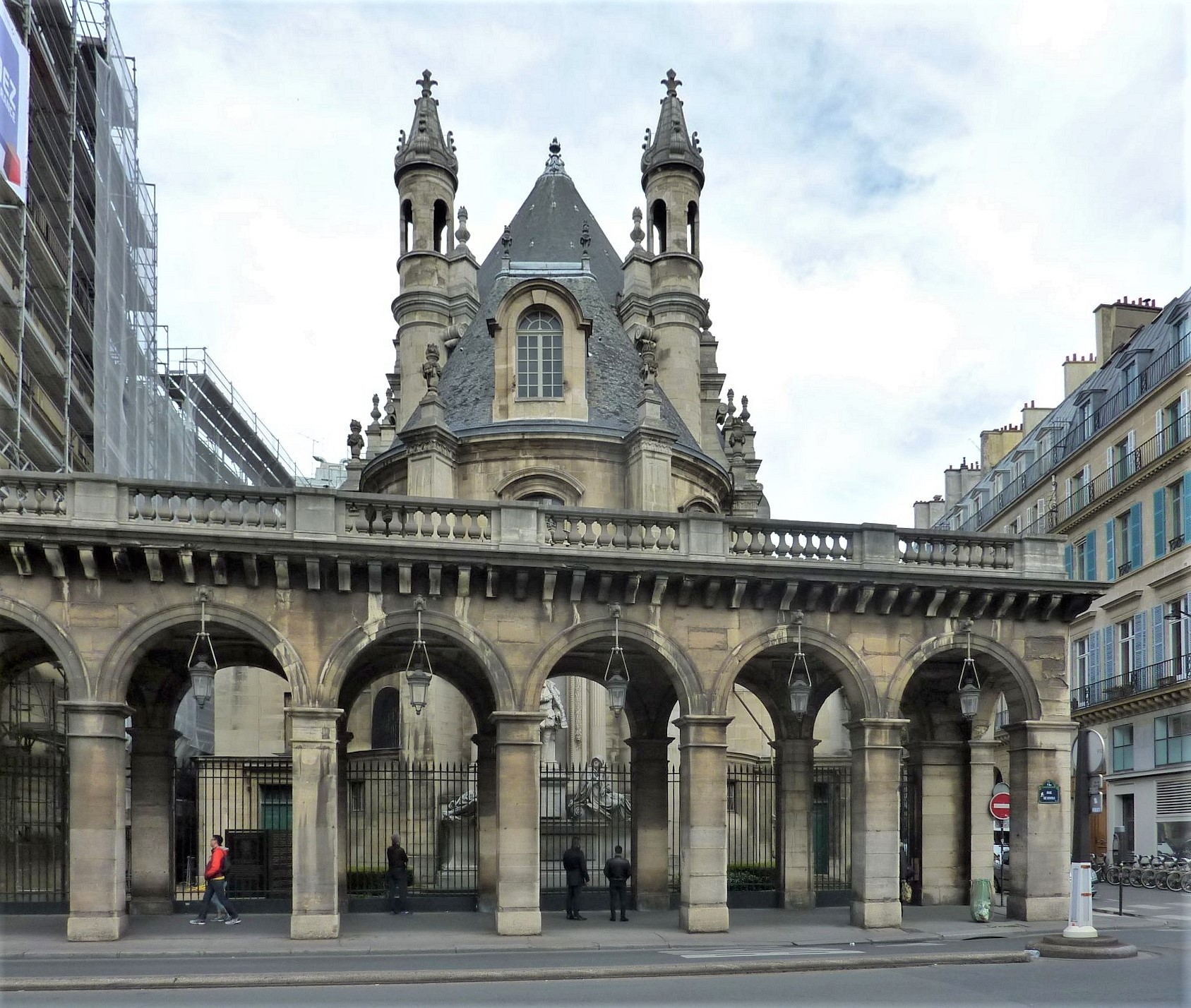
Colonade and Apse

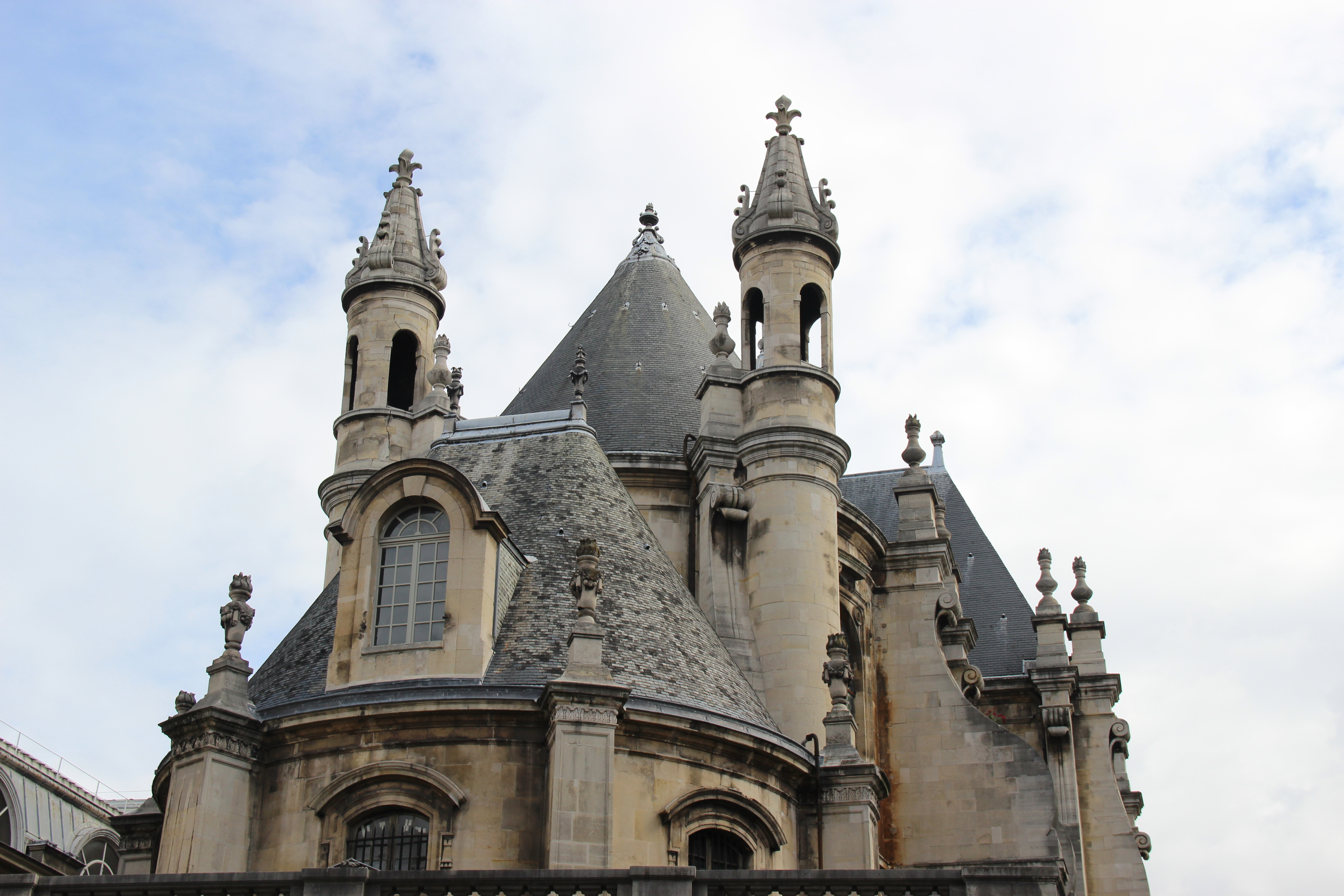
Towers of the apse

The exterior of the church has very different styles on the Rue du Rivoli and the Rue Saint-Honore. The facade on the Rue Saint-The facade on the Rue Saint-Honorḗ is neoclassical, while the apse is largely in the Baroque style.

The closest métro station is Louvre – Rivoli.

== Interior ==
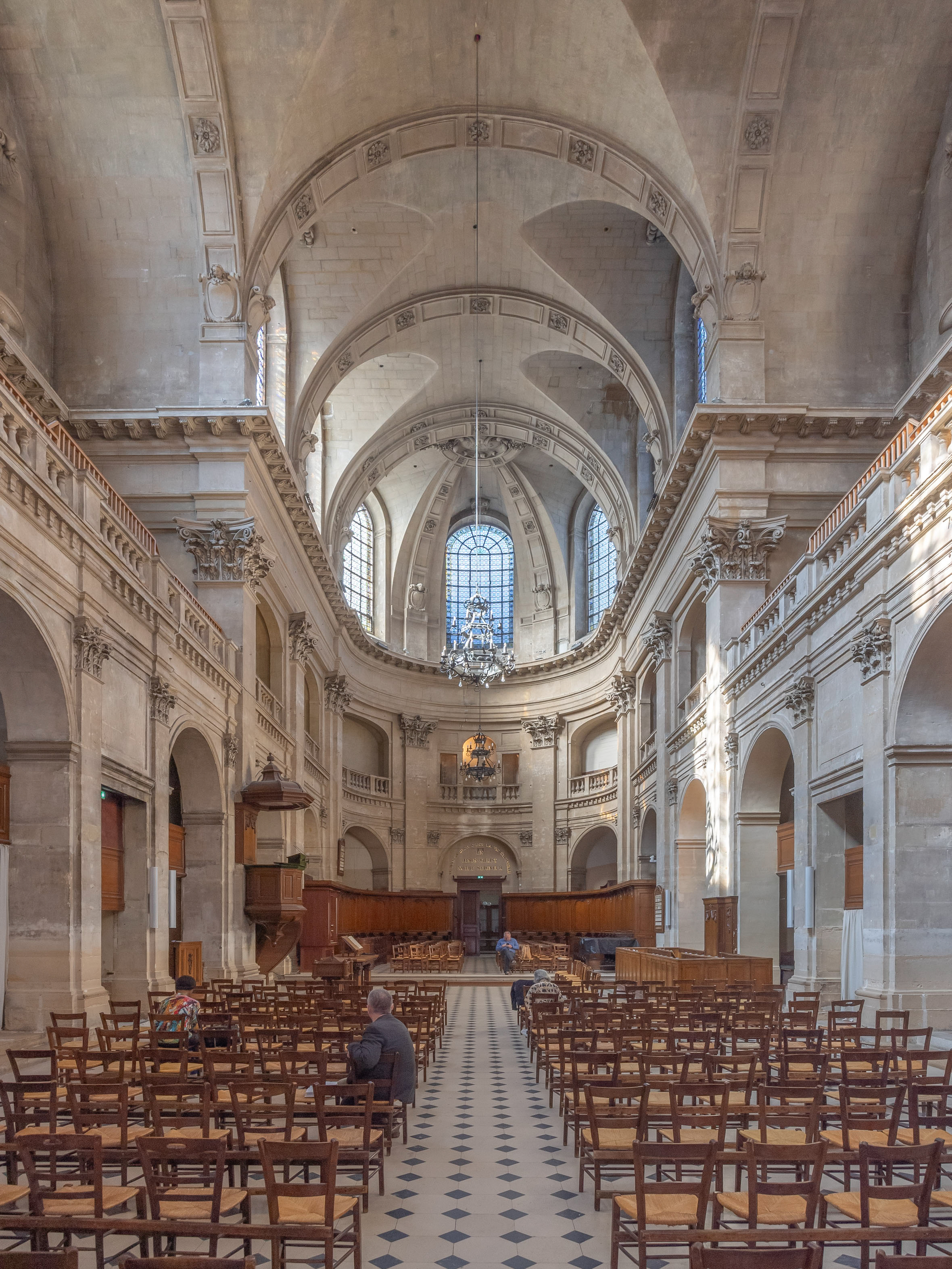
The nave and choir

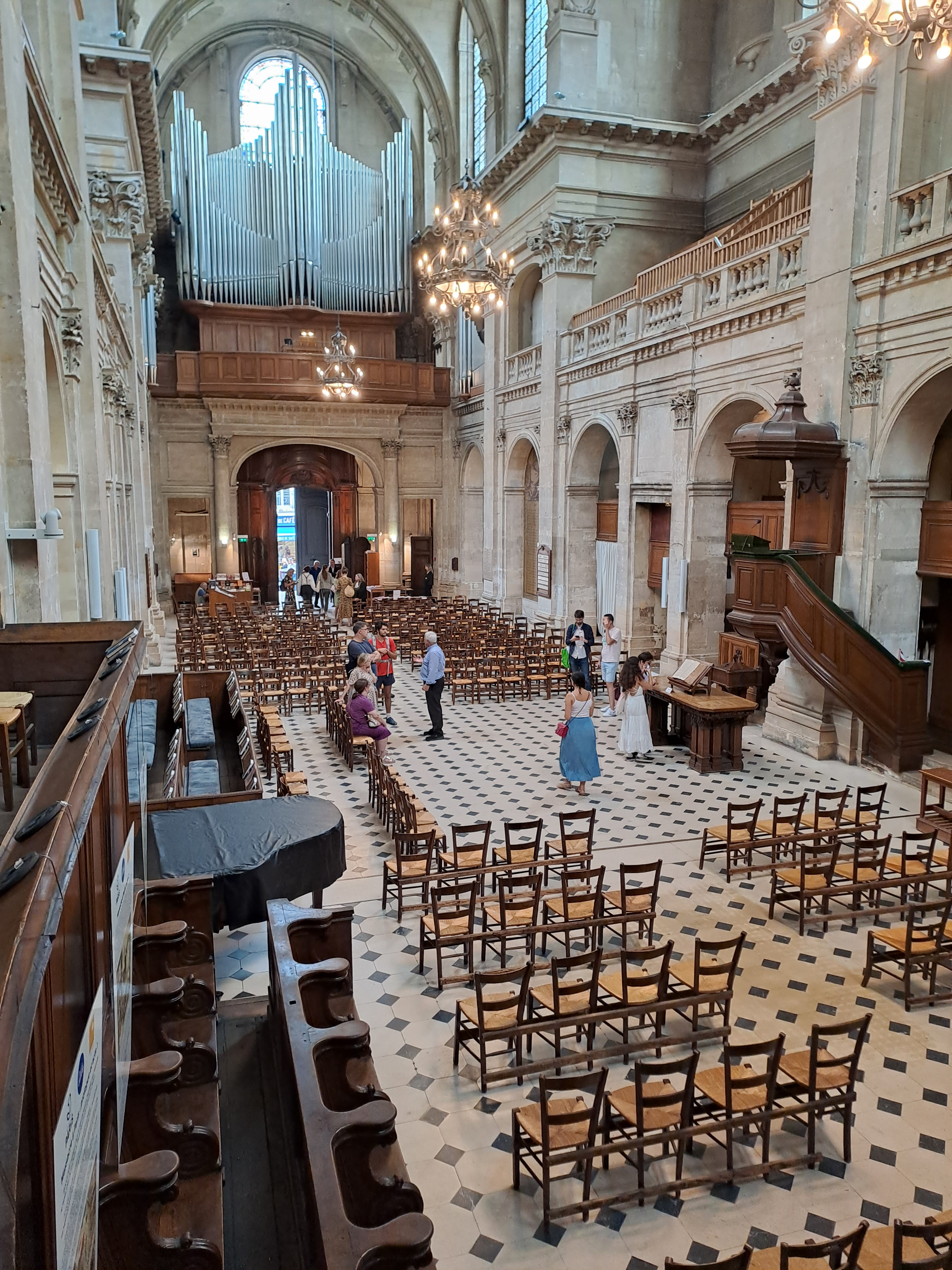
The nave and the grand organ

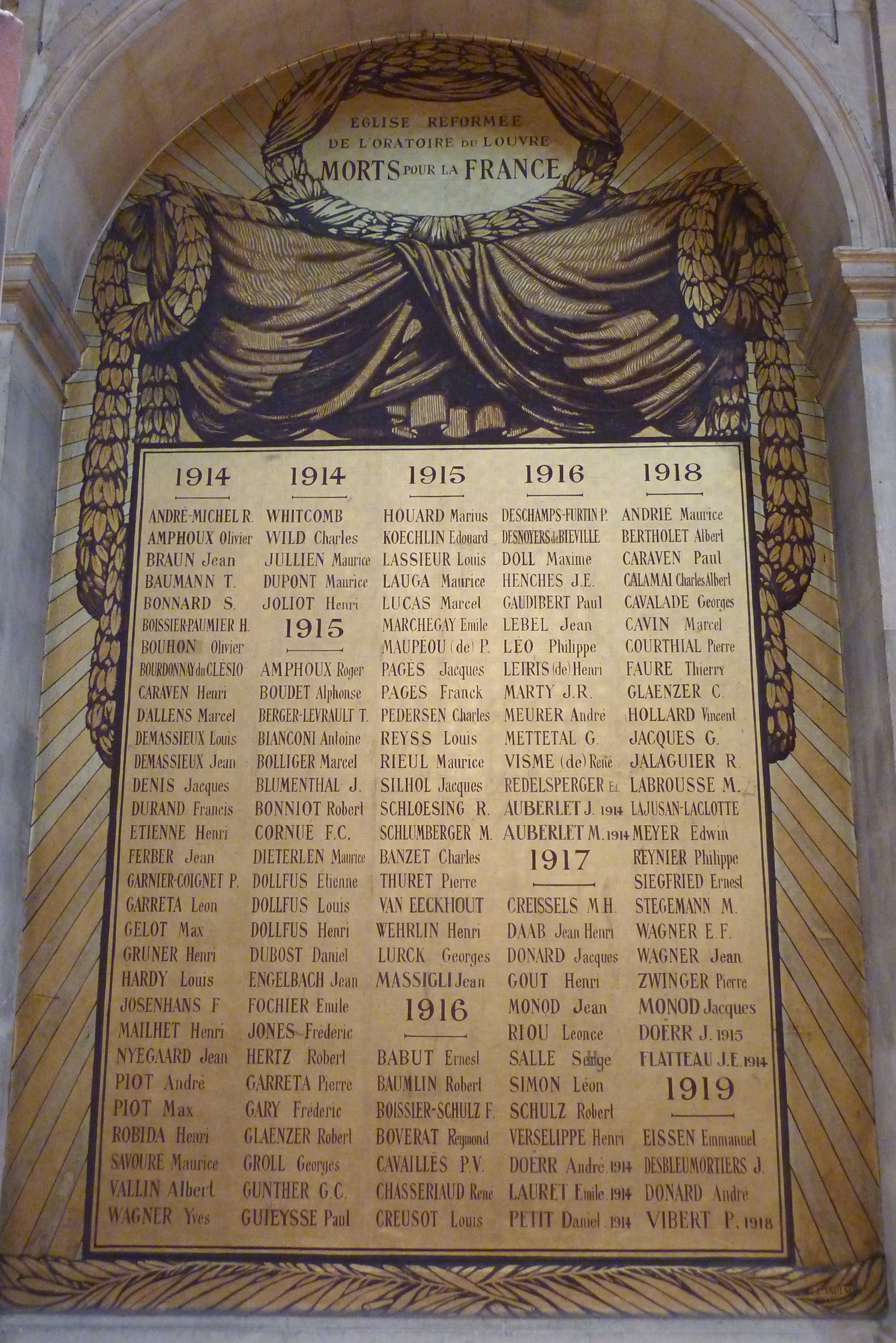
Memorial to church members killed in World War I

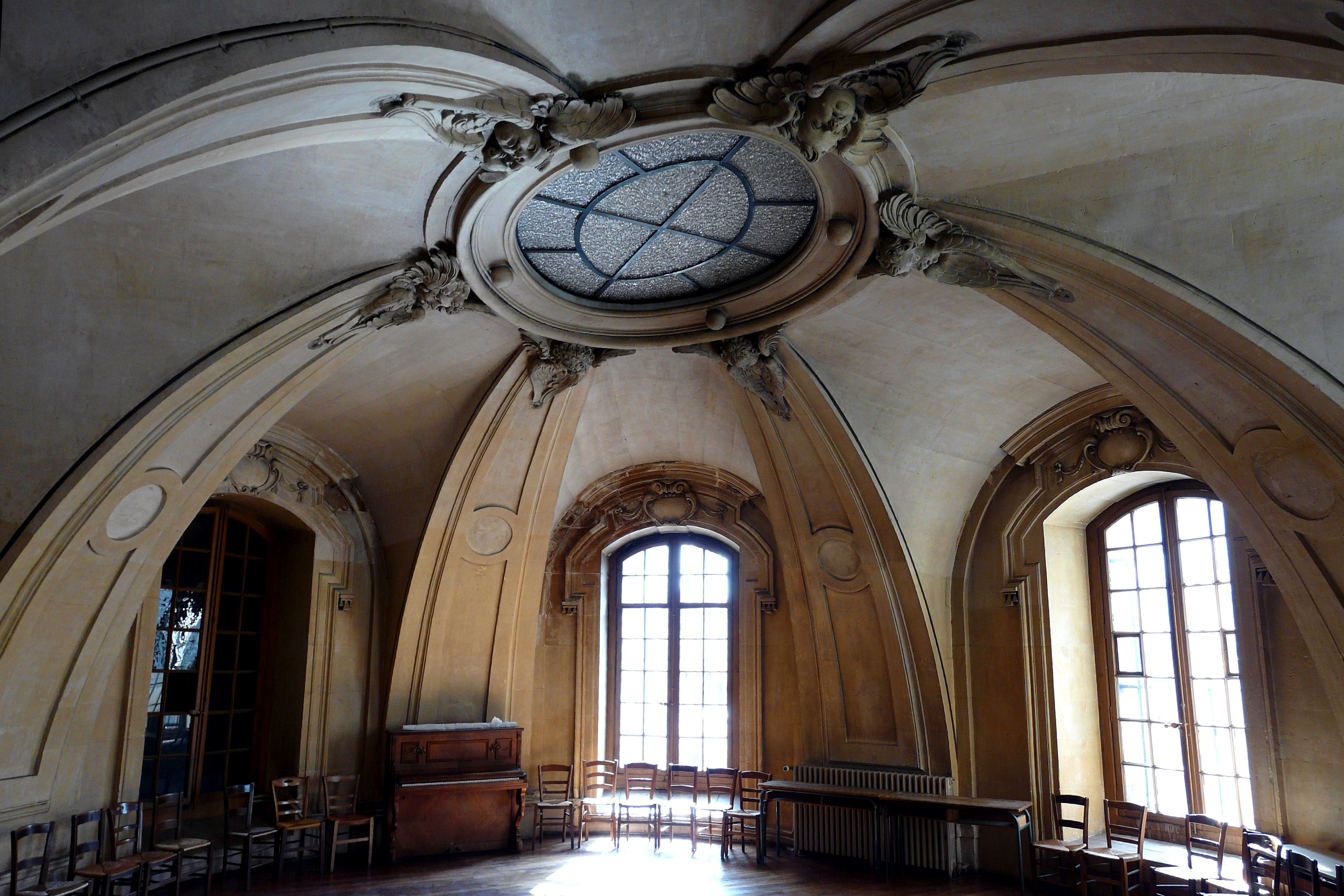
The upper room, onetime home to the American Church in Paris and later The Scots Kirk, Paris

THe nave underwent major modifications in the 18th century, replacing Baroque elements with elements of Neoclassical architecture. This is particularly visible in the nave, lined with stately classical columns and pilasters topped with Corinthian capitals, and wooden tribunes or balconies were placed into the chapels that line the nave. However, some baroque elements can still be seen the chapels that line the nave. The chapels were originally decorated by families close to the Oratory members. who commissioned the leading painters of the period, including Simon Vouet, Philippe de Champagne, and Charles le Brun to decorate them. But only one of the original Renaissance ceiling paintings is still in place.

== Art and decoration ==
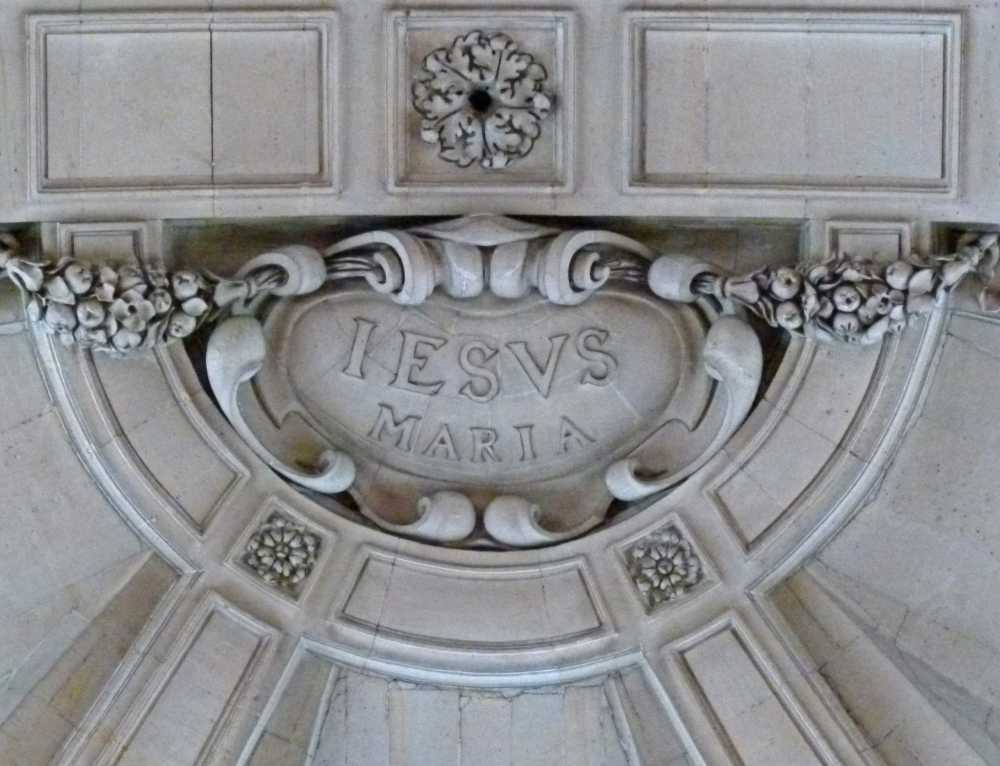
Keystone from the early church, with Oratory motto "Jesus and Mary"

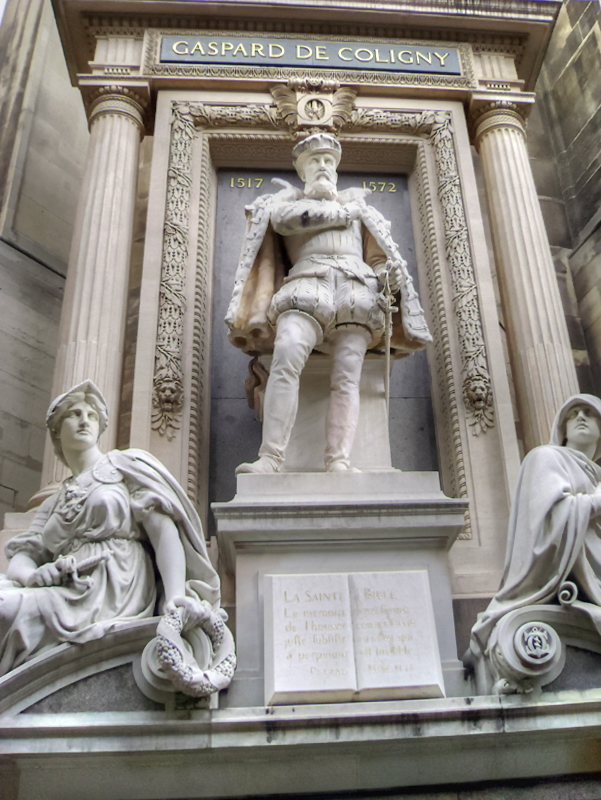
Statue of Protestant leader Gaspard II de Coligny over the portal

.

The central sculpture over the portal represents the Protestant leader Gaspard II de Coligny, who was killed during the Saint Bartholomew's Day Massacre. It was created by the architect Scellier de Gisors and the sculptor Gustave-Adolphe Crauck (1827-1905)

Most of the paintings from this period were destroyed during the French Revolution. The only original painting from this period still visible is "The Conversion of Saint Paul on the Road to Damascus" by Charles Le Brun (1619-1690) It is surrounded by small paintings of angels holding the instruments of the Passion of Jesus.

== The organ ==
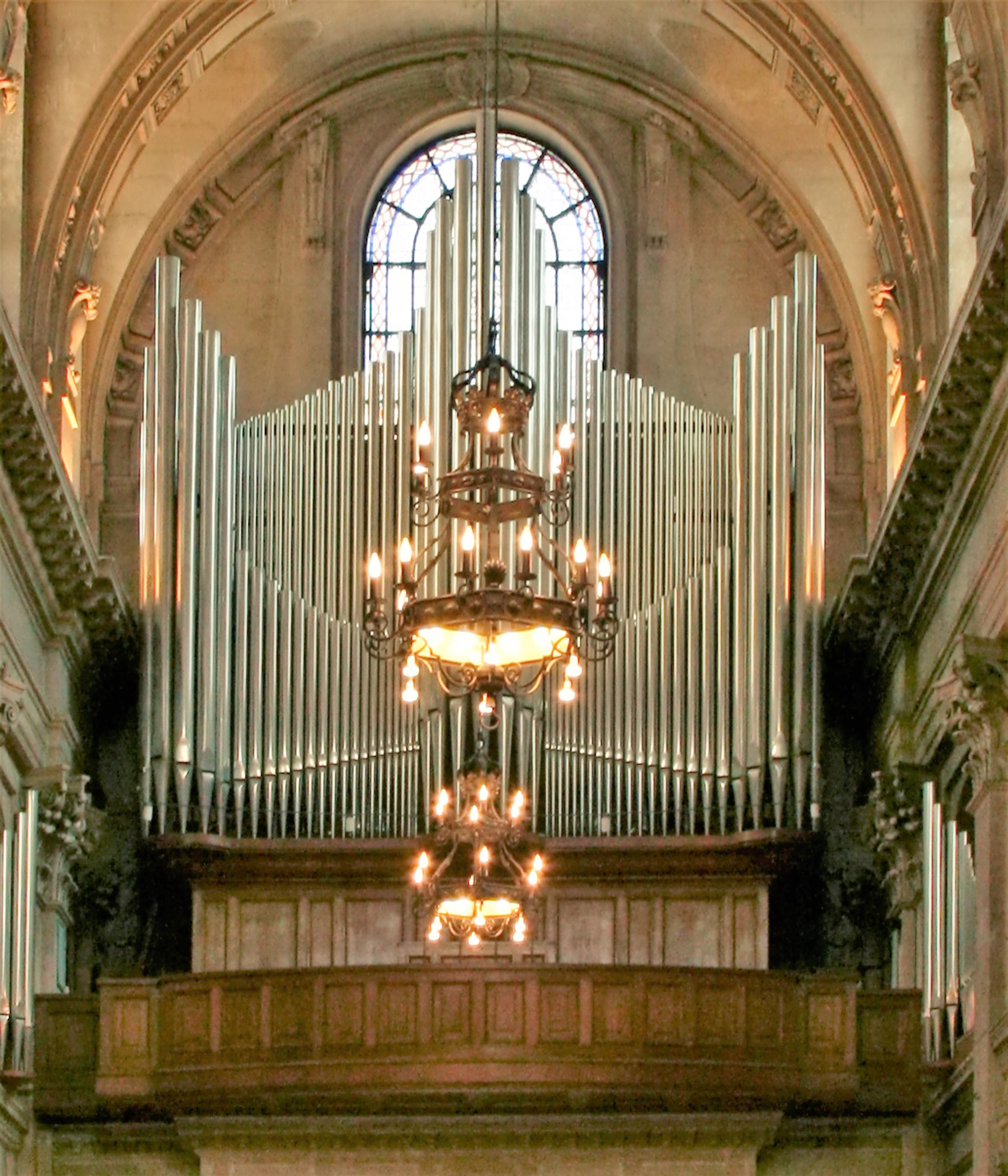
the grand organ

The grand organ of the church is located in the tribune. It was built in 1898 by Merklin, and underwent major restoration between 1957 and 1962.

(To hear recordings of the organ being played, go to the church website at Accueil)

== Prominent pastors ==
Pastors of the Oratoire du Louvre
- Paul-Henri Marron 1803-1832
- Jacques Antoine Rabaut-Pommier 1803-1816
- Jean-Frédéric Mestrezat 1803-1807
- Jean Monod 1807-1836
- Henri François Juillerat 1816-1867
- Frédéric Monod 1819-1849
- Athanase Josué Coquerel 1832-1867
- Joseph Martin-Paschoud 1836-1866
- Adolphe Monod 1847-1856
- Matthieu Rouville 1850-
- Auguste-Laurent Montandon 1860-1906
- Numa Recolin 1882-1893
- Auguste Decoppet 1882-1906
- Ariste Viguié 1882-1891
- Jules-Émile Roberty 1891-1925
- Élisée Lacheret 1893-1902
- Théodore Monod 1902-1906
- John Viénot 1906-1932
- Wilfred Monod 1907-1938
- Paul Vergara 1922-1954
- André-Numa Bertrand 1926-1946
- Émile Guiraud 1933-1937
- Gustave Vidal 1938-1960
- Élie Lauriol 1946-1961
- Pierre Ducros 1954-1968
- René Château 1961-1978
- Bernard Reymond
- Laurent Gagnebin 1963-1965
- Christian Mazel 1964-1988
- André Pierredon 1968-1976
- Jean-Michel Perrault 1995-2003
- Pierre-Yves Ruff 1997-2001
- Werner Burki 2003-2008
- Florence Taubmann 2003-2007
- Marc Pernot 2007-2017
- James Woody 2009-2016
- Richard Cadoux 2017-2018
- Béatrice Cléro-Mazire 2018-présent
- Agnès Adeline-Schaeffer 2019-2024

== Sources ==
Braunstein, Philippe (2011). L'Oratoire du Louvre et les protestants parisiens. Paris: Labor et Fides. ISBN 978-2830914320.
