= Bernard Reymond =

Swiss protestant theologian (1933–2025)

- Born: 7 January 1933; Lausanne, Switzerland
- Died: 29 June 2025 (aged 92)
- Occupation: Theologian

Bernard Reymond (7 January 1933 – 29 June 2025) was a Swiss pastor and theologian, honorary professor of practical theology at the Romand pastoral Institute of the University of Lausanne, which belongs to the current of Liberal Christianity.

== Biography ==
In 1975, Bernard Reymond supported a thesis on theologian Louis Auguste Sabatier entitled Le Procès de l'autorité dans la théologie d'Auguste Sabatier and translated a book by Friedrich Schleiermacher.

He was a pastor at the Oratoire du Louvre in Paris, then in the canton de Vaud.

In his works, Bernard Reymond particularly studies the links between religion and culture in its various forms: literature, fine arts, cinema.

He was at the origin of the International Society for Practical Theology, founded in 1992.

== Publications ==
- Protestantisme et littérature
- (with collab. of Marie-Claude Baatard), La Femme du pasteur : un sacerdoce obligé ?, Labor et Fides, Geneva; éditions du Cerf, Paris, 1991 ISBN 978-2-8309-0649-3
- Sur la trace des théologies libérales, Van Dieren, 2002
- Le Protestantisme et ses pasteurs : une belle histoire bientôt finie ?, Genève, Labor et Fides, 2007 ISBN 978-2-8309-1233-3
- Dieu survivra-t-il au dernier homme ? Essai sur la religion de l'Homo sapiens, Labor et Fides, 2012
- Auguste Sabatier : un théologien à l'air libre (1839-1901), Labor et Fides
- Le Protestantisme et le Cinéma : les enjeux d'une rencontre tardive et stimulante, Labor et Fides
- Le Protestantisme et Calvin : que faire d'un aïeul si encombrant ?, Labor et Fides
- Le Protestantisme et la Musique : musicalité de la parole
- Théâtre et christianisme
- Le Protestantisme et les Images : pour en finir avec quelques clichés
- De vive voix : oraliture et prédication, Labor et Fides, ISBN 978-2-8309-0893-0
- Entre la grâce et la loi : introduction au droit ecclésial protestant, Labor et Fides
- (Translation) Friedrich Daniel Ernst Schleiermacher, De la religion. Discours aux personnes cultivées d'entre ses mépriseurs (1799)
- La Théologie pratique : statuts, méthodes, perspectives d'avenir, Congrès international œcuménique et francophone de théologie pratique, Éditions Beauchesne
