= Rémi Gounelle =

French protestant theologian

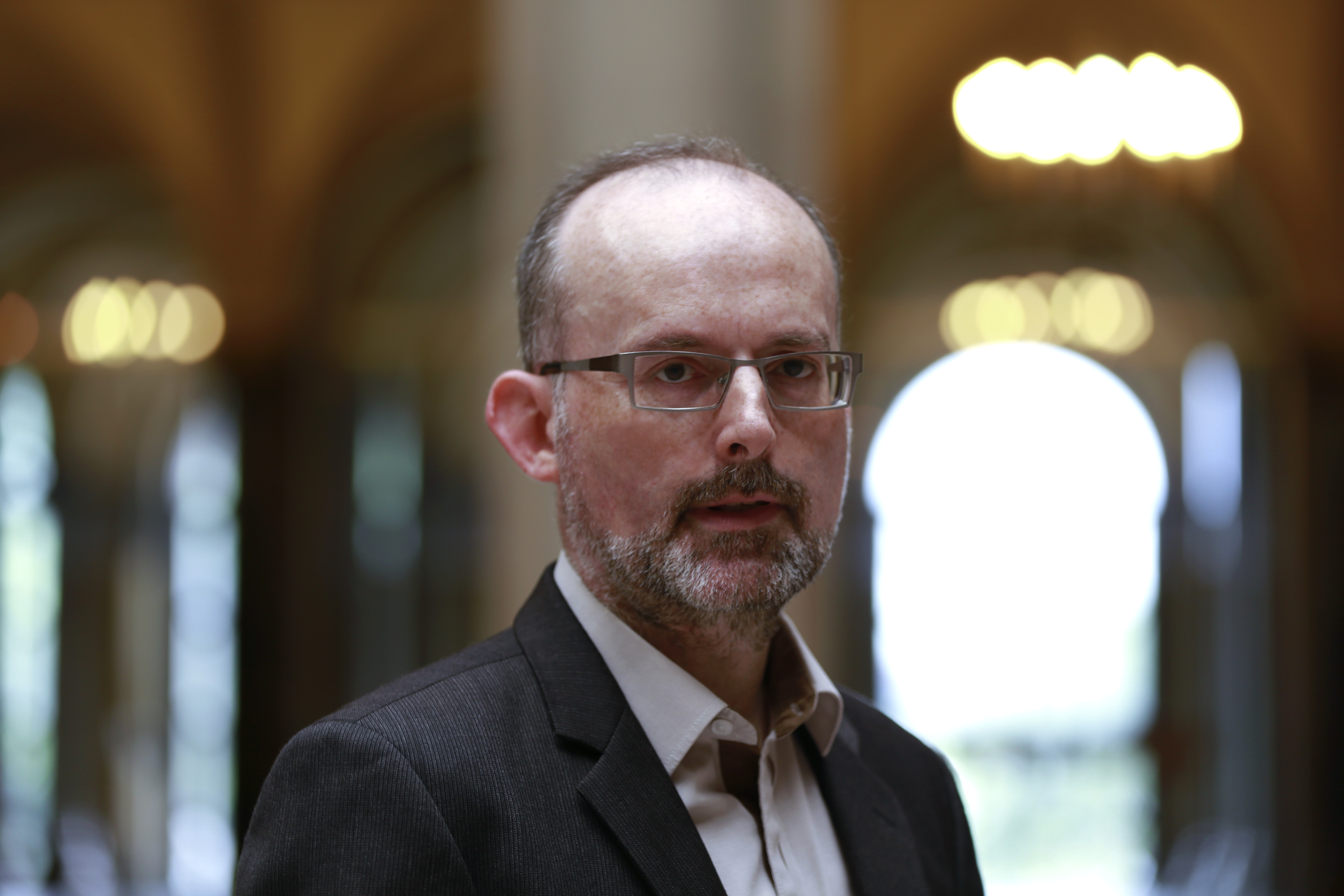
- Rémi Gounelle in 2015
- Born: 5 January 1967 (age 59); Dreux, France
- Education: École pratique des hautes études University of Lausanne
- Occupation: Theologian
- Relatives: André Gounelle (uncle)

Rémi Gounelle (born 5 January 1967) is a French Reformed theologian, a professor of history of early Christianity at the Faculté de théologie protestante de Strasbourg and dean of that same faculty since 2010.

== Biography ==
Rémi Gounelle holds a doctorate from the École pratique des hautes études, section of Religious Sciences, and a doctorate in theology from the Lausanne University. He was awarded the Prix Paul Chapuis-Secretan. He is the nephew of André Gounelle, Reformed theologian and professor emeritus at the Faculté de théologie protestante de Montpellier. He is also related to pastor Élie Gounelle and Michel Hollard, a member of the French resistance .

Rémi Gounelle is holder of an habilitation. In 2003–2004, he was a lecturer in the Faculty of Theology of the University of Neuchâtel and scientific collaborator of the Romand Institute of Biblical Studies.

== Research topics ==
Rémi Gounelle's research interests include the Acts of Pilatius and the "cycle of Pilate", the Latin narratives of Christ's descent into hell, the formation of the canonical Scriptures and the statutes of the Biblical apocrypha, as well as the homilies by Eusebius of Alexandria and the Syrian-Palestinian literature of the fourth and fifth centuries, among others Cyril of Jerusalem and Eusebius of Emesa.

== Publications ==
=== Books ===
- 1997: L'Évangile de Nicodème ou les Actes faits sous Ponce Pilate (recension latine A), followed by La Lettre de Pilate à l'empereur Claude. Introduction and notes by Rémi Gounelle and Zbigniew Izydorczyk. Translation by R. Gounelle from a text developed by Z. Izydorczyk, Turnhout, Brepols (Apocryphes, 9)
- 2000: La Descente du Christ aux enfers. Institutionnalisation d'une croyance, Paris, Institut d'études augustiniennes (Collection des Études augustiniennes, Série Antiquité, 162)
- 2008: Les Recensions byzantines de l'Évangile de Nicodème, Turnhout - Prahins, Brepols - éditions du Zèbre (Corpus Christianorum, Series Apocryphorum, Instrumenta, 3 ; Instruments pour l'étude des langues de l'Orient ancien, 7)

=== Direction of books ===
- 2004: La Descente du Christ aux enfers, Paris, Éditions du Cerf (Cahiers Évangile, Supplement 128)
- 2007: (with A. Frey) : Poussières de christianisme et de judaïsme antiques. Studies gathered in honour of Jean-Daniel Kaestli and Éric Junod, Prahins (CH), Éditions du Zèbre (Publications de l'Institut romand des sciences bibliques)
- 2008: (with A. Noblesse-Rocher) : Le Décalogue, Paris, Cerf (Cahiers Évangile, Supplement 144)
- 2008: (with J.-M. Prieur) : Le Décalogue au miroir des Pères, Strasbourg, Université Marc Bloch (Cahiers de Biblia Patristica, 9)
- 2009: Lire dans le texte les apocryphes chrétiens, Paris, Cerf (Cahiers Évangile, Supplement 148)
- 2014: (with J. Joosten) : La Bible juive dans l’Antiquité, Prahins (CH), éditions du Zèbre (Histoire du texte biblique, 9)
- 2015: (with B. Mounier) : La Littérature apocryphe chrétienne et les Écritures juives, Prahins (CH), éditions du Zèbre

=== Collective works ===
- Christologie entre dogmes, doutes et remises en question, ed. Van Dieren
- Marc Boss and Raphaël Picon (dir.), Penser le Dieu vivant, Festschrift given to André Gounelle, éd. Van Dieren, 2003 ISBN 2-911087-39-9
