= Jean-Marc Berthoud =

French theologian and author

Jean-Marc Berthoud (born 1939) is a Swiss theologian and author. He has published many books on modern and historical Christianity.

== Early life ==
Jean-Marc Berthoud was born in 1939 in South Africa from Swiss missionary parents who originally hailed from Neuchâtel.

== Education ==
Berthoud attended the University of the Witwatersrand in Johannesburg in the Republic of South Africa, where he obtained two Bachelors of Arts in History and English. He researched Colonial History at the Sorbonne and the University of London between 1960 and 1964.

== Biography ==
In the spring of 1966, Berthoud converted to Christianity as a result of reading The Treatise on Scandals by John Calvin, after taking an eager interest in Calvin’s French style. He then abandoned a promising academic career. To support a large family, he worked as a gardener, then railroad porter, and finally as a part-time manual postal employee until retiring professionally in 2004.

Berthoud has published more than thirteen books in French and has written one in English, a biography of French reformer Pierre Viret. At present, he is working on a detailed explanation of the Book of Revelation in the form of sermons. Among his unpublished works are a multiple-volume study of The Ten Commandments in Their Exposition throughout Scripture and a Commentary on Ezekiel 1 to 24. He is putting the final touches on a four-volume lecture series on The Covenantal History of the Church in the World, tracing the theme of God’s covenant, focusing particularly on God’s covenantal people and their relation to the life of the nations. He served for many years as editor of the reviews Résister et Construire and of Documentation Chrétienne. He presided over the Association Vaudoise de Parents Chrétiens and of the Association Création, Bible et Science, was the director of a collection of books, Messages, for the Éditions L’Age d’Homme, and ran a Christian bookshop, La Proue, for over twenty years.

Among other positions, Berthoud opposes abortion, advocates for creationism, and is a critic of dispensationalism.

Berthoud lives in Lausanne, Switzerland with his wife Rose-Marie. They have five children and eight grandchildren.
