= Pierre Viret =

Swiss theologian

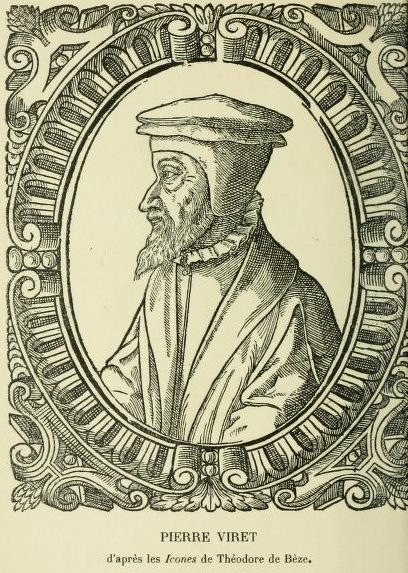
Portrait of Viret in Theodore Beza's Icones (1580)

Pierre Viret (1509/1510 – 4 April 1571) was a Swiss Reformed theologian, evangelist and Protestant reformer.

== Early life ==
Pierre Viret was born in 1509 or 1510 in Orbe, then in the Barony of Vaud, now in the canton of Vaud, Switzerland. He was the son of Guillaume Viret, a tailor and shearer. After attending school in his hometown, Viret studied at the Collège de Montaigu of the University of Paris, where he came in contact with and converted to the Reformed faith. He returned to Orbe in 1531 to escape the persecutions in Paris.

== Preaching ==
William Farel, a Protestant preacher, called Viret to the ministry when he returned to Orbe. On 6 May 1531, Viret preached his first sermon. His preaching was received with astonishment and acclamation, and many were soon converted to the Reformed Faith, including Viret's parents. He initially preached in Orbe and Grandson, and later in Payerne, Neuchâtel and Geneva before undertaking missionary tours in France, where he preached to crowds of thousands in Paris, Orléans, Avignon, Montauban, and Montpellier. His preaching was sweet and winning, earning him the name of "The Smile of the Reformation."

At one time, he was captured by Catholic forces. Viret was considered one of the most popular French-speaking preachers in the 16th century. Above all he was the reformer of the city of Lausanne, where he converted the local population to the Reformed faith. In his time, Lausanne and Geneva became training grounds for Reformation preachers. Among those who studied in Lausanne was the author of the Belgic Confession, Guy de Brès. While at Lausanne, Viret contributed to the foundation of a school of theology (which would become the University of Lausanne) in 1537, where he worked as a professor. In 1559, along with most of the academic staff, Viret resigned his seat over disagreements with the Bernese authorities and moved to Geneva. He and other relocated professors and students from the Lausanne school soon became the foundation of the Academy of Geneva.

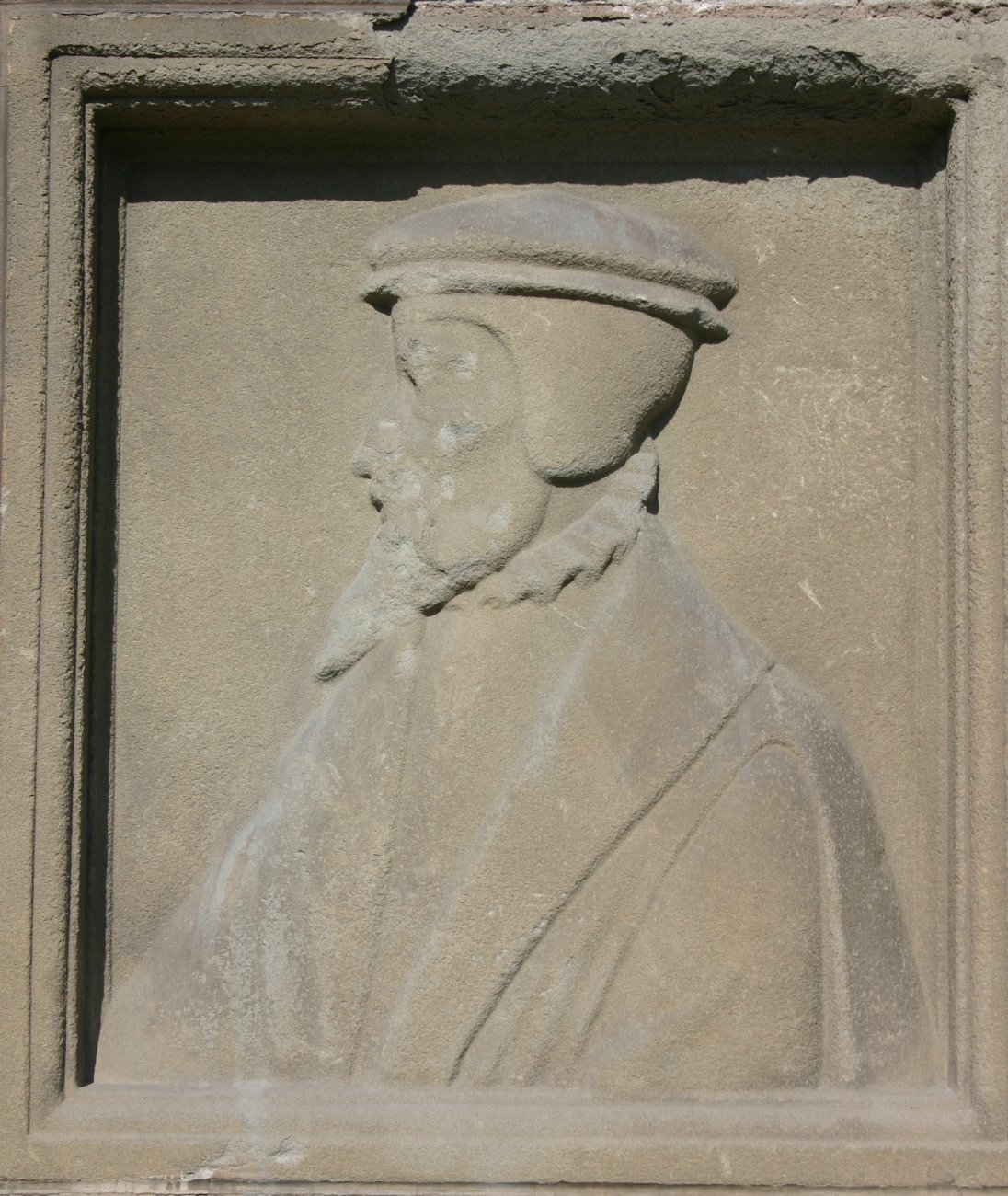
Bas relief of Pierre Viret.

In 1561, Viret moved to Southern France, possibly for health reasons. After serving as a pastor in Nîmes and Montpellier, he was called to Lyon, in 1563, to preside a synod of the Reformed churches of France. According to Melchior Adam, "in Lyon, preaching out in the open, he brought thousands to saving faith in Jesus Christ."

Expelled from the city two years later, in 1567 he accepted an invitation from Jeanne d'Albret, Queen of Navarre, to introduce the Reformation to the Béarn. He died in Bellocq or Orthez in 1571.

== Legacy ==
Jean-Marc Berthoud suggests that "if his good friend, John Calvin, was the consummate dogmatician and the prince of exegetes, Pierre Viret must be considered as the finest ethicist and the most acute apologist of the sixteenth century." Robert D. Linder notes that "Viret, unlike Calvin, was ready to extend openly the authority of the Bible over the State." Linder concludes that "Viret deserves a far more prominent place in the story of the Reformation than he has been accorded thus far, especially by historians in the English-speaking world."

== Translated works ==
Viret authored over fifty books, many of which have been translated into English, including:

- Anchor of the Soul: An Exposition of the Apostles Creed
- The Catechism of Pierre Viret
- The Christian and the Magistrate: Roles, Responsibilities, and Jurisdictions
- Exposition of the Ten Commandments
- His Glorious Bride
- Jesus Christ, the Believer's Comfort and Joy
- Letters of Comfort to the Persecuted Church
- Marvelous Trinity
- Simple Exposition of the Christian Faith

=== Decalogue Commentary Series ===
- No Other God
- Nothing Like God
- Taking His Name in Vain
- Remember the Sabbath Day
- Honor thy Father and Mother
- Thou Shalt Not Kill: A Plea for Life
- Thou Shalt Not Commit Adultery
- Thou Shalt Not Steal
- Defend the Truth
- Thou Shalt Not Covet

== Sources ==
(in order of publication)

- (Crespin, J.), Procédures Tenues à l'Endroit de Ceux de la Réligion du Pais-Bas (Procedures Held With Regard to those of the Religion of the Netherlands) (Jean Crespin, Geneva 1568)
- Merle d'Aubigné, J.H. (translated by W.L.R. Cates), History of the Reformation in Europe in the Time of Calvin, 8 volumes (Longmans, Green, Longman, Roberts, and Green, London 1863-1878), Vol III: France, Switzerland, Geneva (1864), at pp. 262–76 (Extract at website of Pierre Viret Association)
- Cart, J., Pierre Viret, le Réformateur Vaudois, Biographie Populaire (Librairie Meyer, Lausanne 1864) (Read at Google)
- Godet, P., Pierre Viret (F. Payot, Lausanne 1892) (read at Google)
- Doumergue, E., Lausanne au temps de la Réformation: avec une introduction sur Pierre Viret et Orbe, sa ville natale, et un appendice sur les deux premiers imprimeurs protestants de Lausanne (Georges Bridel et Cie., Lausanne 1903)
- Barnaud, J., Pierre Viret, Sa Vie et Son Oeuvre (1511-1571) (G. Carayol, Saint-Amans (Tarn) 1911)
- Schnetzler, C., Vuilleumier, H., and Schroeder, A. (eds), Pierre Viret d'après lui-même : pages extraites des oeuvres du Réformateur à l'occasion du 4e- centenaire de sa naissance (Georges Bridel et Cie., Lausanne 1911)
- Le Jubilé de Pierre Viret : Lausanne et Orbe : 23–26 octobre 1911 (Eglise Nationale Evangélique Réformée du Canton de Vaud. Commission Synodale, 1911)
- H. Vuilleumier, Notre Pierre Viret (Payot, Lausanne 1911)
- Schaff, P., 'Pierre Viret and the Reformation in Lausanne', in History of the Christian Church, 8 Volumes (C. Scribner's Sons, New York 1916-1923), VIII: The Swiss Reformation, 1519-1605, at pp. 250–52 (Extract at website of Pierre Viret Association)
- Vuilleumier, H., Histoire de l'Eglise Réformée du Pays de Vaud sous Régime Bernois, 4 volumes (Editions la Concorde, Lausanne 1927)
- Vincent, G., Rhyn, G. and Wüst, P., Pierre Viret, un Vaudois se lève : Quelques traits d'une grande histoire rassemblés pour la jeunesse Vaudoise à l'occasion du Quatrième Centenaire de la Réformation, 1536-1936 (Editions la Concorde, Lausanne 1936).
- L. Latourette, 'Les dernières années de Pierre Viret (1567-1571)', Revue de Théologie et de Philosophie (Lausanne) New Series Vol. XXVI (1938), pp. 60–68.
- Linder, R.D., The Political Ideas of Pierre Viret, Travaux d'Humanisme et Renaissance, Vol. LXIV (Librairie Droz, Geneva 1964)
- Linder, R.D., 'Forgotten reformer', Christian History Magazine, Issue 71, pp. 35–37 (Read at journal website)
- G. Bavaud, Le Réformateur Pierre Viret (1511-1571), sa Théologie, "Histoire et Société" collection, No. 10 (Labor & Fides, Geneva 1986) (Preview at Google)
- O. Favre, 'Pierre Viret (1511-1571) et la Discipline Ecclésiastique', (author of M.A. Dissertation 'La discipline ecclésiastique dans la théologie du Réformateur Pierre Viret', Faculty of Reformed Theology, Aix-en-Provence 1993) (Archived at Wayback Machine)
- Troilo, D.-A., 'L'Œuvre de Pierre Viret: Le problème des sources', Bulletin de la Société de l'Histoire du Protestantisme Français (1903-2015) Vol. 144: Octobre–Novembre-Décembre 1998 (Librairie Droz, Geneva), pp. 759–790
- 'Viret, Pierre', in H.J. Hillebrand (ed.), Oxford Encyclopedia of the Reformation (Oxford University Press 1996, 2005 online version)
- Berthoud, J.-M., Pierre Viret: A Forgotten Giant of the Reformation: The Apologetics, Ethics, and Economics of the Bible, (Zurich Publishing, 2010)
- Sheats, R.A., 'Pierre Viret: The Unknown Reformer', Faith For All Of Life Magazine (Chalcedon, March/April 2011) Read at Chalcedon Magazine: Resources, Magazine pdf
- Sheats, R.A., Pierre Viret: The Angel of the Reformation, (Zurich Publishing, 2012)
- Crousaz, K., and Solfaroli Camillocci, D. (eds), Pierre Viret et la Diffusion de la Réforme (Antipodes, Lausanne 2014)
