= André Gounelle =

French theologian, priest and academic (1933–2025)

The Reverend André Gounelle
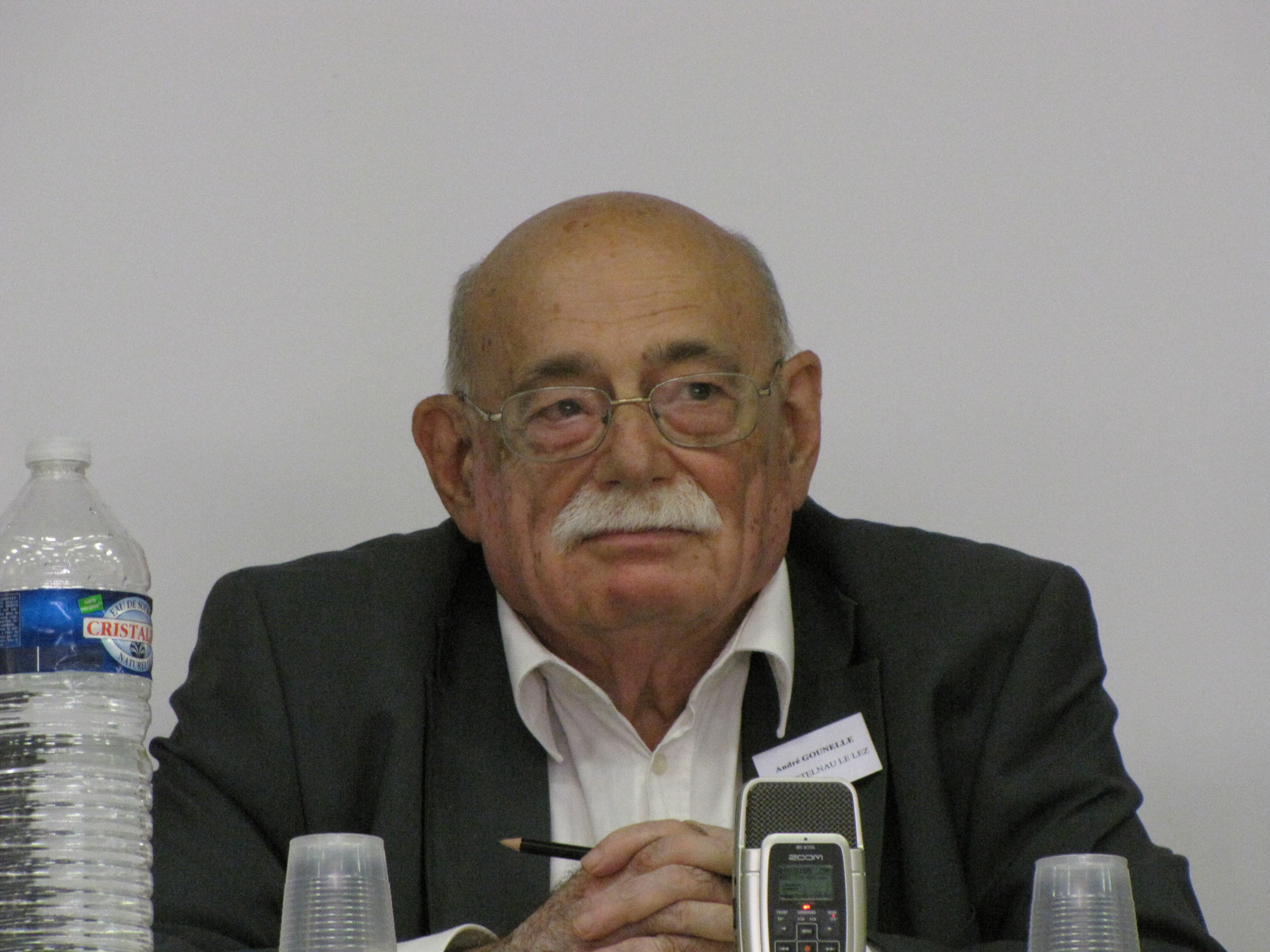
- Gounelle in 2011
- Born: André Jean Gounelle; 9 May 1933; Nîmes, France
- Died: 4 May 2025 (aged 91); Castelnau-le-Lez, France
- Education: University of Montpellier; Faculté de théologie protestante de Montpellier
- Occupations: Theologian, Reformed minister, academic
- Relatives: Rémi Gounelle (nephew)

André Gounelle (9 May 1933 – 4 May 2025) was a French theologian, Reformed minister and academic.

== Life and career ==
Born in Nîmes on 9 May 1933, Gounelle was born into a family of Reformed Protestant pastors and theologians, notably his uncle Élie Gounelle and his nephew Rémi Gounelle. He grew up in Oran in what was then French Algeria and attended secondary school in Casablanca in the French protectorate in Morocco. He studied letters and philosophy at the University of Montpellier before earning a master's in theology from the Faculté de théologie protestante de Montpellier. He earned a doctorate from the Faculté de théologie protestante de Strasbourg in 1982 with a thesis titled Le Problème de Dieu et le statut de la théologie.

In 1958, Gounelle was consecrated as a pastoral minister within the Reformed Church of France. From 1959 to 1961, he served as a military chaplain during the Algerian War. He then entered academia, serving as dean of the Faculté de théologie protestante de Montpellier from 1975 to 1981. He established close relations with the Université Laval and established theological research programs. From 1980 to 1990, he served on the scientific council of the University of Montpellier Paul Valéry. Throughout his career, he was committed to interreligious dialogue, fostering relationships with Buddhist and Shinto groups and giving several lectures in association with the Amitié judéo-chrétienne de France.

Gounelle died in Castelnau-le-Lez near Montpellier on 4 May 2025, at the age of 91.

== Decorations ==
- Knight of the Ordre des Palmes académiques (1991)
- Knight of the Legion of Honour (1999)

== Publications ==
- L’Entretien de Pascal avec M. de Sacy. Étude et commentaire (1966)
- Foi vivante et mort de Dieu (1969)
- La Bible selon Pascal (1970)
- Après la mort de Dieu, Lausanne, L'Âge d'Homme (1974)
- Le Dynamisme créateur de Dieu, Essai sur la Théologie du Process, Études théologiques et religieuses (1980)
- Les Grands Principes du protestantisme (1985)
- Le Protestantisme, ce qu'il est, ce qu'il n'est pas (1985)
- Le Christ et Jésus. Trois christologies américaines : Tillich, Cobb, Altizer (1990)
- Après la mort qu'y a-t-il ? Les discours chrétiens sur l'au-delà (1990)
- Protestantisme (1992)
- Le Baptême. Le débat entre les Églises (1996)
- La Cène, sacrement de la division (1996)
- La Mort et l'au-delà (1998)
- Dans la cité, Réflexions d'un croyant (2002)
- Parler du Christ (2003)
- Parler de Dieu (2004)
- En chemin avec Paul Tillich (2005)
- Penser la foi (2006)
- Paul Tillich. Une foi réfléchie (2013)
- Théologie du protestantisme (2021)
