= Paul de Gually =

French-born British general (died 1737)

Major-General Paul de Gually (died 1737) was a French Huguenot soldier who served in the British Army after his exile from France.

== Career ==
Gually was appointed lieutenant-colonel of the Count de Paulin's regiment of French foot on 2 April 1706, and was granted brevet rank as a colonel of foot on 1 January 1708. On 7 March 1709, he was major of Colonel John Trapaud's regiment of foot, and on 24 June 1710 succeeded Trapaud as colonel of a regiment of dragoons serving in Portugal. The regiment was disbanded in 1712 and Gually was drawing half-pay as a colonel of dragoons in 1722. He was promoted to brigadier-general on 12 March 1727 and major-general on 4 November 1735. He died in London in 1737.
