= Laurent du Bois =

17th century French Church pastor in Boston

Laurent du Bois was the first pastor of the first French Church in Boston, organizing a congregation in 1685. He served until the following year when he was succeeded by David de Bonrepos, a refugee from the Antilles. The congregation members were Huguenots, a term for French Protestants. Du Bois changed his name to Laurentius Van den Bosch after living in Holland.
