= Pierre Stouppe =

Swiss-born American educator

- Born: 1690
- Died: 6 January 1760 (aged 69–70)

Pierre Stouppe (1690 – 6 January 1760) was a Swiss-born American educator.
