= List of French suffragists =

This is a list of French suffragists who were born in France or whose lives and works are closely associated with that country.

== Suffragists ==
- Gabrielle Alphen-Salvador (1856–1920) – philanthropist, suffragist and pacifist
- Marie-Rose Astié de Valsayre (1846–1939) – feminist, suffragist, established the Ligue de l'Affranchissement des femmes in 1889
- Hubertine Auclert (1848–1914) – feminist, campaigner
- Olympe Audouard (1832–1890) – feminist, women's rights activist, suffragist
- Marthe Bray (1884–1949) – feminist, suffragist
- Cécile Brunschvicg (1877–1946) – feminist politician, secretary-general of the French Union for Women's Suffrage
- Maria Deraismes (1828–1894) – author, major pioneering force for women's rights
- Jeanne Deroin (1805–1894) – socialist feminist
- Marguerite Durand (1864–1936) – stage actress, journalist, founder of her own newspaper
- Blanche Edwards-Pilliet (1858–1941) – physician, activist, suffragist
- Nicole Girard-Mangin (1878–1919) – army physician, suffragist
- Olympe de Gouges (1748–1793) – playwright and political activist
- Caroline Kauffmann (1840–1926) – feminist, women's rights activist, suffragette
- Germaine Malaterre-Sellier (1889–1967) – nurse, suffragist and pacifist
- Louise Michel (1830–1905) – anarchist, school teacher, medical worker
- Héra Mirtel (1868–1931) – writer, feminist, salonnier, suffragist
- Jane Misme (1865–1935) – journalist, feminist, suffragist
- Jeanne Oddo-Deflou (1846–1915) – translator, educator, feminist and suffragist, founder of Groupe français d'Etudes féministes in 1891
- Madeleine Pelletier (1874–1939) – physician, psychiatrist, socialist activist
- Maria Pognon (1844–1925) – writer, feminist, suffragist and pacifist
- Colette Reynaud (1872–1965) – feminist, socialist and pacifist journalist; co-founder of La Voix des femmes in 1917
- Léonie Rouzade (1839–1916) – feminist, suffragist, writer and socialist politician
- Henriette Sauret (1890–1976) – feminist, author, pacifist, journalist; member of French Union for Women's Suffrage
- Jane Valbot (1884–1961) – feminist, pacifist
- Maria Vérone (1874–1939) – feminist, suffragist, women's rights activist
- Louise Weiss (1893–1983) – writer, feminist, politician, suffragist
- Marguerite de Witt-Schlumberger (1853–1924) – proponent of pronatalism and alcoholic abstinence, president of the French Union for Women's Suffrage

== See also ==
- List of suffragists and suffragettes
- Timeline of women's suffrage
- Women in France
