= Brunschvicg =

Brunschvicg is a surname. Notable people with the surname include:

- Cécile Brunschvicg (1877–1946), French feminist politician, wife of Léon
- Léon Brunschvicg (1869–1944), French Idealist philosopher
