= National Council of French Women =

French women's rights organization

- Conseil National des femmes françaises
- Logo of the organization
- Abbreviation: CNFF
- Formation: 1901
- Legal status: Active
- Purpose: Support women's rights
- Headquarters: 228 Boulevard Raspail - 75014 Paris, France
- Official language: French
- Affiliations: International Council of Women (ICW)
- Website: www.cnff.fr

The National Council of French Women (French: Conseil National des femmes françaises, CNFF) is a society formed in 1901 to promote women's rights. The first members were mainly prosperous women who believed in using non-violent means to obtain rights by presenting the justice of the cause. Issues in the first half century included the right to vote, legal equality between husband and wife, paternal child support, social support for children, equal employment opportunity, equal pay for equal work and acquisition of citizenship on marriage. The National Council of French Women is affiliated with the International Council of Women (ICW). Now the oldest of French feminist organizations, it continues to work for causes related to the rights of women.

== Background ==
Eliska Vincent (1841–1914) founded the feminist group "Equality of Asnières" in 1888, which engaged in a moderate form of activism for women's suffrage that drew support from bourgeois women. She succeeded Hubertine Auclert (1848–1914) as the generally recognised leader of the suffrage movement in Paris when Auclert moved to Algeria in 1888.

During the 1900 World Exposition in Paris there were several women's congresses and meetings. Feminists differed on subjects such as the responsibility of fathers for illegitimate children, where paternal recognition would give a child the right to bear their father's name and to inherit from him, but would also in some cases give the father the right of custody. At one of the conferences Maria Pognon, who would be one of the founders of the CNFF, argued against paternity suits and for a national maternity fund to support unwed mothers and their children. Her proposal was rejected by the majority of attendees.

The 1900 meetings included the philanthropic and educational Congress of Women's Works and Institutions (Congrès des Œuvres et Institutions Féminines) and the Congress on the Status and Rights of Women (Congrès de la Condition et des Droits de la Femme) which called for full gender equality. The two groups decided to combine to form the CNFF, defined as a federation of associations with the purpose of improving the condition of women in education, economics, society, philanthropy and politics. By this time Eliska Vincent had lost her enthusiasm for Equality, and resigned when it joined the National Council of French Women.

== Foundation ==
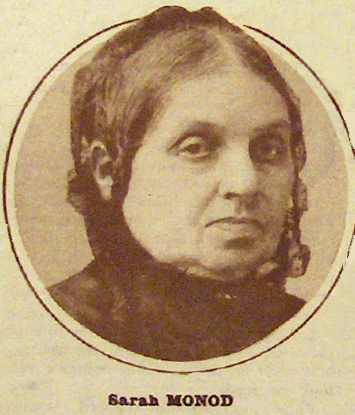
Sarah Monod, first president of the CNFF

The CNFF was formally launched on 18 April 1901. The initial committee was headed by Isabelle Bogelot. It included Sarah Monod (1836–1912), Avril de Sainte-Croix (1855–1939) and Julie Siegfried (1848–1922) from the Congress of Women's Works and Institutions, and Marie Bonnevial, Madame Wiggishoff and Maria Pognon from the Congress on the Status and Rights of Women. Although Maria Pognon was concerned that Sarah Monod was for many the "standard-bearer of Protestantism," the choice of the majority was for Sarah Monod to be president due to her high moral and intellectual character.

The majority of the members of the council were moderate bourgeois Republicans. There was a tiny minority of socialists headed by Louise Saumoneau and Élisabeth Renaud, balanced by the Catholic Right led by Marie Maugeret. The teacher Marie Bonnevial, a contributor to the feminist daily La Fronde, and a well-known feminist by the start of the 20th century, was deeply involved in both the CNFF and in the French league for women's rights (Ligue française pour le droit des femmes). At its inaugural meeting the CNFF claimed to have 35 associated organisations with 21,000 members. These did not include Catholic women's groups, who were more likely to affiliate with the Patriotic League of Frenchwomen (Ligue Patriotique des Françaises). Most Catholic women philanthropists accepted the patriarchal view of the family promulgated by their church and did not participate in the CNFF.

== History ==
=== Pre-World War I ===
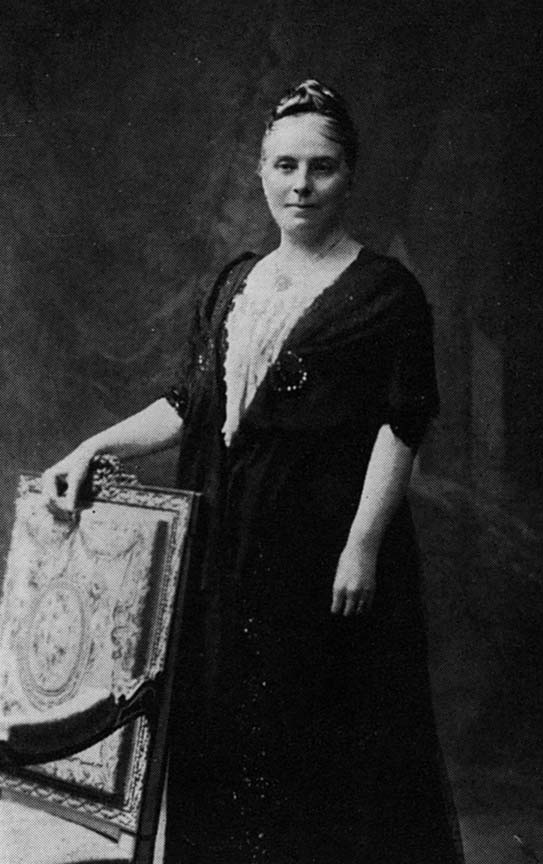
Julie Siegfried, second president

The CNFF peaked in the period before World War I (1914–18), an era when feminist movements flourished in Europe and elsewhere. The CNFF joined the International Council of Women (ICW), created in 1888 in the United States. On 10 May 1902 the CNFF, with 40 federated associations representing 28,000 members, passed a unanimous motion that women's suffrage was the most basic of all women's demands. From 1902 Avril de Sainte-Croix was a strong advocate of women's suffrage in the CNFF. In 1903 Sainte-Croix was secretary general of the CNFF and also of the French branch of the International Abolitionist Federation, (Note: The International Abolitionist Federation campaigned for revocation of laws that regulated prostitution.) which she ran from her home at 1 Avenue Malakoff. Pauline Kergomard was president of the CNFF section on education from 1905 to 1920.

The CNFF passed a resolution against abortion in 1906, citing the maternal mission and the altruistic function of mothers. The majority of feminists in France felt that delinquent fathers of illegitimate children should be forced to provide support, but did not deserve paternal rights. In 1903 the CNFF and the French Group for Feminist Studies led a group that proposed a law in which paternity would be based on a reasonable presumption rather than absolute proof, the father would be required to pay to support the child, but the mother would retain parental power. The supporters of the feminists in the Chamber of Deputies would not accept this proposal, since they felt it did not encourage marriage and paternal responsibility. A law passed in 1912 required proof of paternity in writing, did not allow recognition of children of incest or adultery, and imposed heavy fines on women whose attempts to prove paternity were rejected.

The CNFF, at first moderate in stating its position, was very active between 1909 and 1914 in advocating women's suffrage. By 1910 the CNFF had almost 75,000 members. On 11 November 1911 Sarah Monod received the Legion of Honor from the hands of Senator Camille Ferdinand Dreyfus. The French government noted a number of reforms that had been inspired or recommended by the CNFF under her leadership: Julie Siegfried (1848-1922), from a Protestant and deeply Republican bourgeois family, took over the leadership of the CNFF from Monod in 1912. Gabrielle Duchêne, a wealthy philanthropist who helped organise seamstresses in Paris, was president of the labor section of the CNFF from 1913 to 1915. On the eve of World War I there were 150 societies in the CNFF including the French Union of Woman Suffrage, with 80 branches, the Society for the Improvement of Women's Lot and the Fraternal Union of women.

=== World War I ===
When World War I (1914–18) began feminists were expected to suspend their demands and support their country in its struggle. During the war the CNFF would not support the pacifist movement. The official line was that French women had always been sympathetic to pacifism and sought "peace and international understanding, if not in the entire world, at least in Europe". However, "until the German women protested to their own government against its violations of international law and the crimes of its army against civilians, any cooperation with them would be a betrayal of the nation; the fact that they belong to the female sex was quite irrelevant".

=== Inter-war years ===
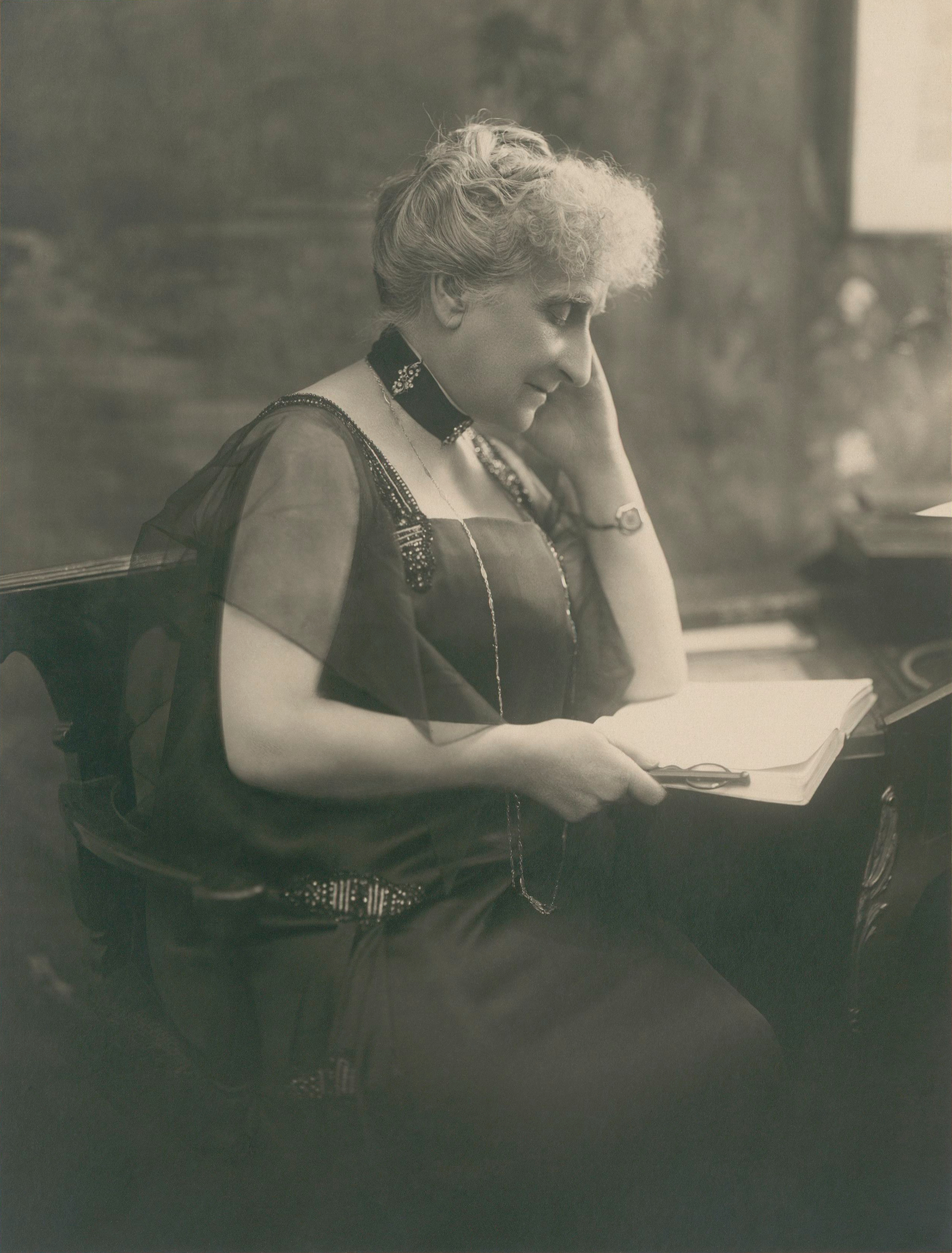
Avril de Sainte-Croix

Unlike other European countries, women in France did not gain the right to vote after the war, but the CNFF gained influence and prestige. In 1919 Avril de Sainte-Croix and the CNFF engaged in a campaign to convince the Allied leaders at the Versailles Peace Conference to address women and their problems in the charter of the new League of Nations, with partial success. The CNFF also worked to convince the French senators to pass the bill for women's suffrage. Julie Siegfried's husband, Jules Siegfried, was a deputy and won passage of the right for women to vote in 1919, but the law was rejected by the Senate. Julie Siegfried was decorated with the Knight's cross of the Legion of Honor by Alexandre Millerand.

Avril de Sainte-Croix organized the CNFF congress in 1919. The congress was held in Strasbourg on 8–9 October 1919. At this meeting it called for a reform to the laws so that a French woman who married a foreigner could choose to retain her nationality. A draft change to the law was proposed under which a French woman would remain French unless she chose to take her husband's nationality. This was proclaimed as "a big step taken in just a few years" at the CNFF meeting in 1922, but the CNFF also asked for reciprocity, the right for a foreign woman who had married a French man to automatically have the right to French citizenship. This eventually found its way into the law of 10 August 1927.

In the postwar period the CNFF prepared arguments for reform of the laws to make it easier to submit paternity suits, while retaining the mother's right to custody of the child. In 1919 the CNFF felt women should contribute to the "struggle against depopulation", and demanded improvements in aid to large families and in child welfare services. They also demanded that women should have equal access to work and equal pay whether or not they were married or had children. Some feminists noted that schemes where the father received child support payments were unlikely to achieve the desired effect. The CNFF issued a position paper in 1919 that demanded an end to the legal disadvantages to which married women were subject, allowing them to make decisions without the approval of their husband, and demanded equal parental rights with any disagreement to be decided in court.

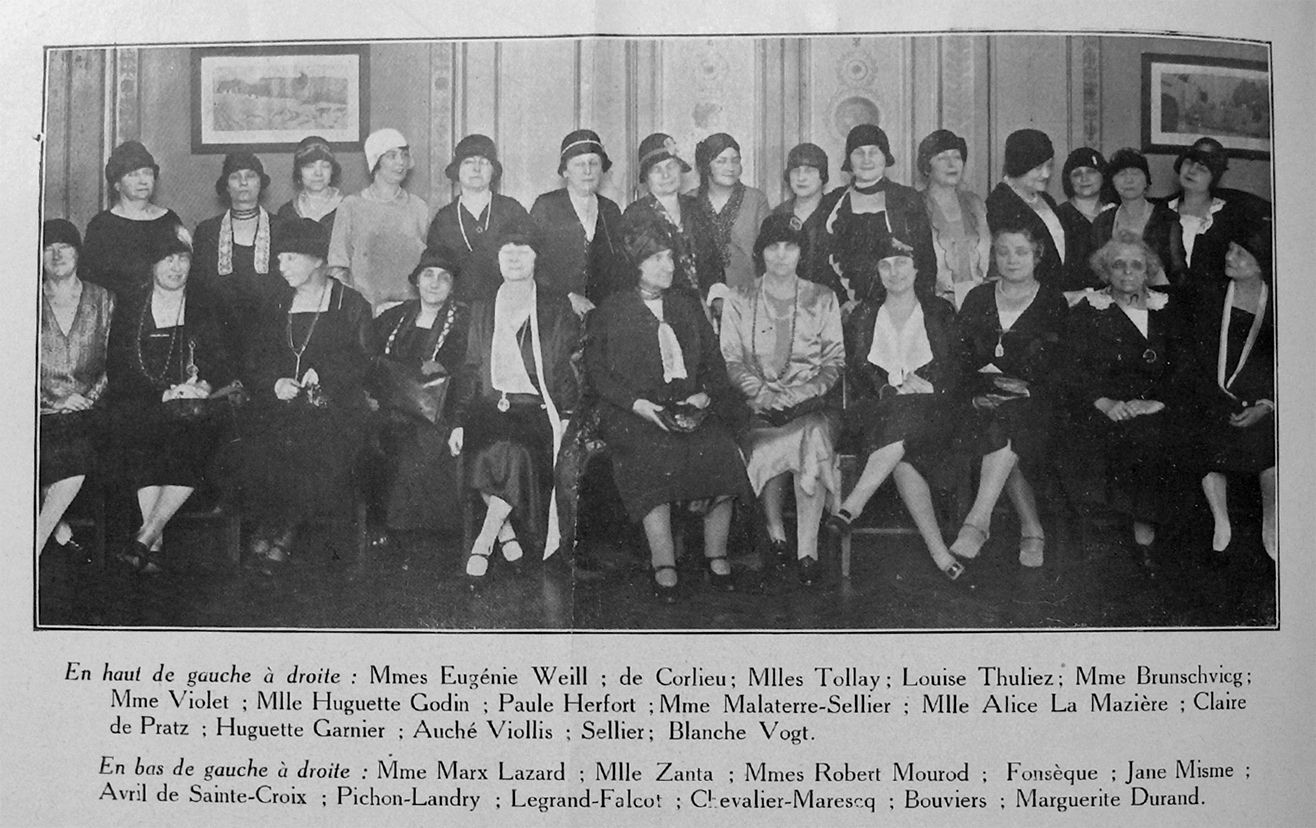
Etats généraux du féminisme, Paris, 1929

In 1922 Avril de Sainte-Croix succeeded Julie Siegfried as president of the CNFF, holding this position until 1932 when she was replaced by Marguerite Pichon-Landry. In 1925 the CNFF had 125,000 members. Sainte-Croix campaigned in 1927 to have women admitted to the police force. She presided over the CNFF's États-Généraux du Féminisme (Note: The term "Estates General" (Etats Généraux) of Feminism is a reference to the Estates-General of 1789 which launched the French Revolution.) congresses in 1929, 1930 and 1931. These congresses focused in successive years on women's legal rights, economic standing and position in the colonies. In 1929 the Estates General of Feminism endorsed child allowances. Marguerite Pichon-Landry (1878–1972) chaired the Legislation section of the CNFF from 1914 to 1927, and was secretary-general from 1929 to 1932. She was president from 1932 to 1952. Pichon-Landry was awarded the medal of the resistance and was made a Knight of the Legion of Honor.

=== Post World War II ===
Marie-Hélène Lefaucheux (1904–64) was active in the CNFF after World War II. Lefaucheux was also very active in the Association of Women of the French Union (Association des Femmes de l'Union Française), and served as a link between this organization and the CNFF. Lefaucheux was president of the CNFF from 1954 to 1964, and president of the International Council of Women from 1957 to 1963. She was also a member of the secretariat of the Commission on Women of the United Nations and the French delegation to the United Nations. She achieved major advances for African women. Françoise Bouteiller, president of the CNFF in 1998, testified to the praise given to Lafaucheux by women she had met when she toured Africa for the council in 1975. The Foundation Marie-Hélène Lefaucheux was established to assist African women.

In 1962 the CNFF joined the European Center of the International Council of Women, established in 1962. The CNFF campaigned against social ills including alcoholism, prostitution and the explosion of pornography in the 1970s. The CNFF works discreetly, and with mostly middle-aged members has a bourgeois image. It is today the oldest active French feminist association. The CNFF today has an Executive Committee of which one third is renewed every three years, elected by the General Assembly of the affiliated associations and individual members. The General Assembly is the decision-making body. The Executive Committee has a president and five vice-presidents, a secretary general and deputy secretary general, a treasurer and assistant treasurer. The goal of the CNFF in collaboration with its member organisations is to affirm the place and role of women in society, to ensure respect for their rights, and to contribute to building a united world where women are fairly represented.

== Presidents ==
The presidents of the CNFF have been:

- Sarah Monod 1901–12
- Julie Siegfried 1912–22
- Avril de Sainte-Croix 1922–32
- Marguerite Pichon-Landry 1932–54
- Marie-Hélène Lefaucheux 1954–64
- Lucie Chevalley 1964–70
- Jacqueline Tonnet-Imbert 1970–76
- Solange Troisier 1976–91
- Paulette Laubie 1991–98
- Françoise Bouteiller 1998–2000
- Françoise Delamour 2000–05
- Marie-Jeanne Vidaillet-Peretti 2005–12
- Martine Marandel-Joly 2012

== Notable members ==
- Cécile Brunschvicg, Under-Secretary of State for Education in 1936
- Louise Cruppi, founded and chaired the Science, Arts and Literature Section 1909-1922
- Marguerite de Witt-Schlumberger, philanthropist and feminist
- Eugénie Weill, Chair of the Welfare Section from 1901 to 1930, Treasurer prior to the World War I
- Gabrielle Alphen-Salvador, Chair of the Education Section until 1905
- Dr Thuillier-Landry (Madeleine Émilie Dasthénic), founder in 1923 of the l'Association française des femmes médecins (French Association of Women Doctors)
- Maria Vérone, lawyer and feminist
- Marie d’Abbadie d’Arrast, chair of the Legislation Section
- Pauline Kergomard, chair of the Education Section from 1905
- Olympe Gevin-Cassal, Inspector General for Children
- Gabrielle Duchêne, chair of the Labour section from 1913, chair of the French section of the Women's International League for Peace and Freedom[14]
- Marie Bonnevial, schoolteacher, Freemason and feminist
- Louise Weiss, journalist and feminist
- Marie Georges Martin (née Irma Laîné), chair of the Suffrage Section, Freemason
- Mrs André Siegfried (Paule Laroche)
- Marcelle Legrand-Falco, secretary to the National Council of French Women
- Liliane Klein-Lieber, representative of French Girl Guides to UNESCO in the 1950s, co-founder of Coopération Féminine in the 1960s
- Jane Misme, journalist and feminist
- The Société des agrégés (Society of Female Teachers) was a member from 1929
- Germaine Dulac, journalist and filmmaker, president of the CNFF’s Cinema Section
- Colette Kreder, campaigner against gender discrimination in politics
- Lasthénie Thuillier-Landry, a doctor, chaired the CNFF’s Hygiene Section
- Julie Toussaint, general secretary of the Société pour l'Enseignement professionnel des Femmes

== Sources ==
- Allen, Ann Taylor (2005-07-01). Feminism and Motherhood in Western Europe, 1890-1970: The Maternal Dilemma. Palgrave Macmillan. ISBN 978-1-4039-8143-1.
- Bard, Christine (2015). "Marguerite Pichon-Landry (1878-1972)". University of Angers. Archived from the original on 2016-03-04.
- Carle, Emmanuelle (July 2004). "Gabrielle Duchêne et la recherche d'une autre route". Archives du Féminisme (in French) (7). Archived from the original on 2019-06-06.
- Clark, Linda L. (2000-12-21). The Rise of Professional Women in France: Gender and Public Administration since 1830. Cambridge University Press. ISBN 978-1-139-42686-2.
- Comité d’initiative, CNFF (10 April 1901), Procès-verbal, Conseil national des femmes françaises, Centre des Archives du Féminisme 2 AF 3
- Commissaire général du gouvernement français (1910), l'Exposition universelle et internationale de Bruxelles, Bibliothèque de la Société de l'histoire du protestantisme français: Papiers Sarah Monod
- "Conseil National des Femmes Françaises (CNFF)". Archives du Féminisme. Archived from the original on 2015-09-23.
- Corbin, Alain (1996-09-01). Women for Hire: Prostitution and Sexuality in France After 1850. Harvard University Press. ISBN 978-0-674-95544-8.
- Fauré, Christine (2004-06-02). Political and Historical Encyclopedia of Women. Routledge. ISBN 978-1-135-45691-7.
- "Fonds Marie Bonnevial". BUA.
- "Historique". CNFF. Archived from the original on 2015-04-02.
- Janz, Oliver; Schonpflug, Daniel (2014-04-15). Gender History in a Transnational Perspective: Networks, Biographies, Gender Orders. Berghahn Books. ISBN 978-1-78238-275-1.
- "Julie Siegfried" (PDF). CNFF.
- King, Adele (2002). Rereading Camara Laye. U of Nebraska Press. ISBN 0-8032-2752-3.
- Maitron (2015). "DUCHÊNE Gabrielle [DUCHÊNE Mathilde, Denise, dite". Dictionnaire Biographique Mouvement Ouvrier Mouvement Social. Maitron.
- Monod, Alexandrine Elisabeth Sarah
- "Objectifs". CNFF.
- Offen, Karen (December 2005). "La plus grande féministe de France ». Mais qui est donc Madame Avril de Sainte-Croix ?". Bulletin Archives du Féminisme (in French) (9). translator: Michèle Bruhat. Archived from the original on 2014-10-13.
- "Organisation". CNFF.
- Orr, Clarissa Campbell (1996-01-01). Wollstonecraft's Daughters: Womanhood in England and France, 1780-1920. Manchester University Press. ISBN 978-0-7190-4241-6.
- Paletschek, Sylvia; Pietrow-Ennker, Bianka (2004). Women's Emancipation Movements in the Nineteenth Century: A European Perspective. Stanford University Press. ISBN 978-0-8047-6707-1.
- Rappaport, Helen (2001). Encyclopedia of Women Social Reformers. ABC-CLIO. ISBN 978-1-57607-101-4.
- Smith, Bonnie G. (2008). "Avril de Sainte-Croix, Ghénia". The Oxford Encyclopedia of Women in World History: 4 Volume Set. Oxford University Press. ISBN 978-0-19-514890-9.
- Ward D'Itri, Patricia (1999-01-01). Cross Currents in the International Women's Movement, 1848-1948. Popular Press. p. 87. ISBN 978-0-87972-782-6.
- Weil, Patrick (2010-07-01). How to Be French: Nationality in the Making since 1789. Duke University Press. ISBN 978-0-8223-8947-7.
