= Sarah Monod =

French Protestant philanthropist and feminist

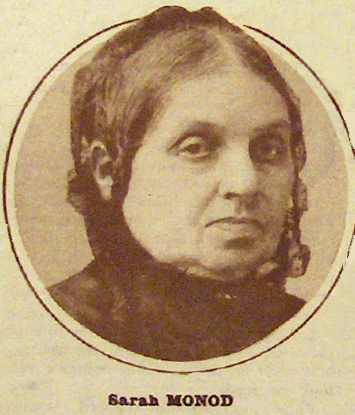
- Born: Alexandrine Elisabeth Sarah Monod; 24 June 1836; Lyon, France
- Died: 13 December 1912 (aged 76); Paris, France
- Occupations: Philanthropist and feminist

Sarah Monod (24 June 1836 – 13 December 1912) was a French Protestant philanthropist and feminist.

== Early years ==
Alexandrine Elisabeth Sarah Monod was born on 24 June 1836 in Lyon. She was the fourth of seven children of the evangelical church pastor of Lyon Adolphe Monod and his wife Hannah Honyman. She was baptized on 24 July 1836. Her godfather was her uncle Edouard Monod, a merchant at Le Havre, and her godmothers were her paternal aunts Eliza and Betsy Monod.

There are few sources about Sarah Monod's childhood. She would have taken private lessons, including Italian and German in addition to English, her mother's language, which she spoke fluently. She also took care of the education of her younger sister Camille, nine years her junior. In the summer she stayed with her sister Émilie in England or with the family of Pastor Puaux in Normandy. From childhood she was a friend of Louise Puaux (Note: Louise Puaux (1837-1914), future wife of the pastor Auguste Decoppet.) and Julie Puaux, (Note: Julie Puaux (1848-1922), wife of Jules Siegfried) future co-workers in the National Council of French women (Conseil national des femmes françaises).

Sarah Monod was very close to her father, who died in 1855 when she was nineteen. After working with him towards the end of his life, she tried to collect his works. She published "The Farewell of Adolphe Monod to his friends and the Church", several volumes of sermons, a collection of letters and a biography of her father.

Her pious education was later very evident in her speeches. She was said by the journalist Jane Misme to be dressed as a Quaker and the "Pope of Protestantism."

== Philanthropy ==
=== Franco-Prussian war ===
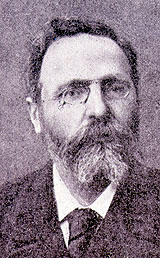
Gabriel Monod, Sarah's cousin, who organized the "Monod" ambulance during the 1870 war

The Franco-Prussian War of 1870 was a turning point in the life of Sarah Monod. On the death of her mother in 1868, she approached the Diaconesses de Reuilly in Paris. It is thanks to her involvement with the Diaconesses de Reuilly that she left on 3 August 1870 for the front of Forbach fifteen days after the declaration of war. The "Monod" mobile ambulance (Note: The "Modin" ambulance had three cousins: Alfred Monod, attorney at the Court of Cassation, was director of the ambulance in which his two cousins officiated: Gabriel Monod, a university professor and future creator of the School of Political Science, and Sarah Monod under the title of inspector of nurses. The squad was composed of a surgeon, six assistant surgeons, seven sub assistants, a pharmacist, two chaplains (a Protestant and a Catholic) and two volunteer nurses, the sisters Émilie Kall and Joséphine Sauer. The nurse's armband of Sarah Monod is preserved in the Library of the Society for the History of French Protestantism, and some cartoons soldiers sketched during the war.) set up at the instigation of the Auxiliary Evangelical Committee for Relief of wounded and sick soldiers, treated more than 1,500 wounded between 3 August 1870 and 3 March 1871, including casualties of the battles of Daucourt and Beaumont.

After the defeat of Sedan, Sarah Monod went to London to raise funds and equipment, then returned to France and the ambulance to treat victims of the campaign of the Loire. On 2 July 1871 she was awarded a Bronze Cross for her service and as an Ambulance Inspector. A few months later, she brought aid to more wounded, those of the Paris Commune, regardless of which side they were on.

=== Abolitionism ===
At the end of the war, she was appointed lay director of the Diaconesses de Reuilly in Paris, a position she held for 30 years, only resigning when she was appointed head of the National Council of French Women in 1901. His only brother William Monod (Note: William Monod (1834-1916). Pastor of Marsauceux in the commune of Mézières-en-Drouais, Eure, of Mouilleron-en-Pareds, Vendée and chaplain of the Diaconesses de Reuilly.) was chaplain of the institution. Sarah Monod organized the section for correctional education in prison of minor Protestant offenders.

In 1861 her correspondence showed growing concern for the plight of women. The women's prison of Saint-Lazare was the place around which her abolitionist Protestant philanthropy crystallized. His father Adolphe Monod preached there on Sunday, while his mother Hannah Honyma was involved in charity work there. In Saint-Lazare Sarah Monod met Isabelle Bogelot, Director of work of former prisoners of Saint-Lazare, and the abolitionists Josephine Butler, Emilie de Morsier and Aimé Humbert.

The shadow of Sarah Monod hovers over the Christian movements that worked to protect girls, including foster homes and employment offices to prevent prostitution among young girls who came to the city looking for a job. In 1892 she and her sister Camille Vernes (Note: Camille Monod (1843-1910), wife of Pastor Charles Félix Vernes, founded with her sister Sarah Monod the Girls' Christian Union (Unions chrétiennes de jeunes filles, UCJF), the French branch of the World Alliance of Young Men's Christian Associations (YWCA). Template: Mme. Charles Verne was the head of the evangelical orphanage of Batignolles established in 1903 and affiliated to the CNFF. Their niece Lucile Morin became president of the YWCA in 1903. She and Mme. Augustine Monod were delegates to the National Council of the French Women of the Workers Home (Femmes Françaises du Foyer de l’Ouvrière). Marie Monod, née Valette (1839-1910), sister-in-law of Sarah Monod, attended the 2nd Congress of Feminine works and women's institutions in 1900, and was Vice President of the UCJF in 1905.) created the Young Women's Christian Union (Unions chrétiennes de jeunes filles), the French branch of Young Women's Christian Association.

Sarah Monod worked with her cousin Henri Monod, (Note: Henri Monod (1843-1911), first cousin of Sarah Monod. Prefect of the Ariège in 1879, Director of Public Assistance from 1887 to 1905, Government Commissioner for the Law of 17 July 1893 on the free medical assistance, Director General of the Public Health Department of the Ministry of the Interior 1905.) director of the Higher Council for Public Assistance.

== Feminism ==
=== Versailles conference ===
In Paris in 1889, on the sidelines of the World Expo, the first congress of works and women's institutions was held, organized by Isabelle Bogelot and Emilie de Morsier. Sarah Monod was part of the congress committee chaired by Jules Simon. She decided, so momentum would not be lost, to bring together annually "all women interested in philanthropy". The Versailles conference, chaired by Sarah Monod for 20 years, was born. The meeting was international, inviting women from all over Europe, the United States, and also from Africa (Lesotho and Senegal). Members of the Committee included the great figures of Protestant Philanthropy: Julie Siegfried, Isabelle Bogelot and Emilie de Morsier. The reports on legislation, health, education, and aid were published in the journal La Femme (The Woman).

In 1899 Sarah Monod and Isabelle Bogelot visited the International Congress of Women in London. Monod collaborated closely with two other activists pastors' daughters, Julie Siegfried (née Puaux) and Marguerite de Witt-Schlumberger (granddaughter of François Guizot).

=== National Council of French Women ===
The National Council of French women (Conseil national des femmes françaises) was established in 1901. The initial committee headed by Isabelle Bogelot included Sarah Monod, Avril de Sainte-Croix and Julie Siegfried from the Congress of works and women's institutions, and Marie Bonnevial, Madame Wiggishoff and Maria Pognon from the International Congress on the condition and rights of women (Congrès international de la condition et des droits de la femme). Although Maria Pognon was concerned that Sarah Monod was for many the "standard-bearer of Protestantism," the choice of the majority was for Sarah Monod as president, due to her high moral and intellectual character. The majority of the members of the council were moderate bourgeois republicans. There was a tiny minority of socialists headed by Louise Saumoneau and Élisabeth Renaud, balanced by the Catholic Right led by Marie Maugeret.

On 11 November 1911 Sarah Monod received the Legion of Honor from the hands of Senator Camille Ferdinand Dreyfus. Among the reforms inspired or recommended by the National Council of French women that she chaired, the French government noted in particular:

- The law of 13 July 1907 on the free salary of married women,
- The meticulous and constant collaboration over various regulations related to women's work,
- The collaboration over the laws and projects aimed at improving the functioning and organization of parental authority,
- The collaboration with the Bill ... before the Senate seeking the institution of juvenile courts.

Under her presidency the suffrage section of the National Council of French Women was created in 1906.

Sarah Monod was a member of journal L'Avant-Courriere (founded in 1893), and even joined the French Union for Women's Suffrage. But her feminism, a term she disliked (Note: She is said to have said at the Conference of Versailles in 1897 "Nous sommes féminines, non féministes (we are feminine, not feminist)") was "dignified without stiffness, tenacious without arrogance, persevering without bitterness, warm without passion". She was reluctant to join in actions and campaigns by some suffragists, but ready to "collaborate in all loyalty and all confidence with women from different walks of life, with different religious, philosophical or social views."

She died in Paris on 13 December 1912 at the age of 76, following a stroke aggravated by her presence at a sale organized for the International Union of Friends of young women (Union internationale des Amies de la jeune fille). Her funeral service was held in the temple of Batignolles by Pastor Benjamin Couve in the presence of guests who include Mme Jules Ferry, Marguerite de Witt-Schlumberger, the Puaux and Jules Siegfried families, and Avril de Sainte-Croix. She is buried in the Père Lachaise Cemetery

== Writings ==
Sarah Monod was very close to the deaconess Caroline Malvesin (1806–1889) of the Deaconesses of Reuilly (a Protestant community of the deaconesses established in 1841) and to their sister superior, writing the booklet “La sœur Malvesin, diaconesse, 1806-1889”, published in 1893.

== Bibliography ==
- Monod, Adolphe Louis F.T. (1857). Les adieux d'Adolphe Monod à ses amis et à l'Église.
- Raynard, Ellen (1862). Agir, c'est vivre. Monod, Sarah (trans.).
- Monod, Sarah (1867). Enseigne-nous à prier, culte du matin et du soir, pour chaque jour du mois. Librairie française et étrangère.
- L'Arc dans la nuée. Translated by Monod, Sarah. Bonhoure. 1870.
- Monod, Sarah (1885). Life and letters of Adolphe Monod, by one of his daughters.
- Monod, Adolphe; Monod, Sarah (1885). Adolphe Monod. I. Souvenirs de sa vie. Extraits de sa correspondance. Avec un portrait. (II. Choix de Lettres à sa Famille et à ses Amis) (in French). Vol. 1. Paris: Librairie Fischbacher..
- Monod, Sarah (1893). La sœur Malvesin, diaconesse, 1806-1889. Lib. Fischbacher.

== Sources ==
- Abbadie d'Arrast (January 1913). "Sarah Monod". La Femme.
- Acte de décès: Monod, Sarah (in French), Archives de Paris
- "Acte de naissance". Archives municipales de Lyon (in French).
- Commissaire général du gouvernement français (1910), l'Exposition universelle et internationale de Bruxelles, Bibliothèque de la Société de l'histoire du protestantisme français: Papiers Sarah Monod
- Correspondance familiale dans les Papiers Sarah Monod, Bibliothèque de la Société de l'histoire du protestantisme français
- Comité d’initiative, CNFF (10 April 1901), Procès-verbal, Conseil national des femmes françaises, Centre des Archives du Féminisme 2 AF 3
- Diebolt, Evelyne; Fouché, Nicole (2011). Devenir infirmière en France, une histoire atlantique ? (1854-1938). Editions Publibook. ISBN 978-2-7483-8044-6.
- "La Femme (Paris. 1879)". Gallica. Bibliothèque nationale de France.
- Misme, Jane (7 July 1899). "Sarah Monod". Le Figaro. Papiers Sarah Monod, Bibliothèque de la Société de l'histoire du protestantisme français.
- Misme, Jane (16 November 1940). Minerva. Centre des Archives du Féminisme 1 AF 567.
- Monod, Alexandrine Elisabeth Sarah
- Monod, Sarah (22 February 1861), "Letter from Sarah Monod to her mother about her visit on 22 February 1861 to the central house of Montpellier", Papiers Sarah Monod, Bibliothèque de la Société de l'histoire du protestantisme français.
- Orr, Clarissa Campbell (1996-01-01). Wollstonecraft's Daughters: Womanhood in England and France, 1780-1920. Manchester University Press. ISBN 978-0-7190-4241-6.
- Papiers Sarah Monod, Bibliothèque de la Société de l'histoire du protestantisme français
- Sainte Croix, Avril de (January 1913). "Homage à Sarah Monod". La Femme. Papiers Sarah Monod, Bibliothèque de la Société de l'histoire du protestantisme français.
