= Jane Misme =

French journalist & feminist (1865–1935)

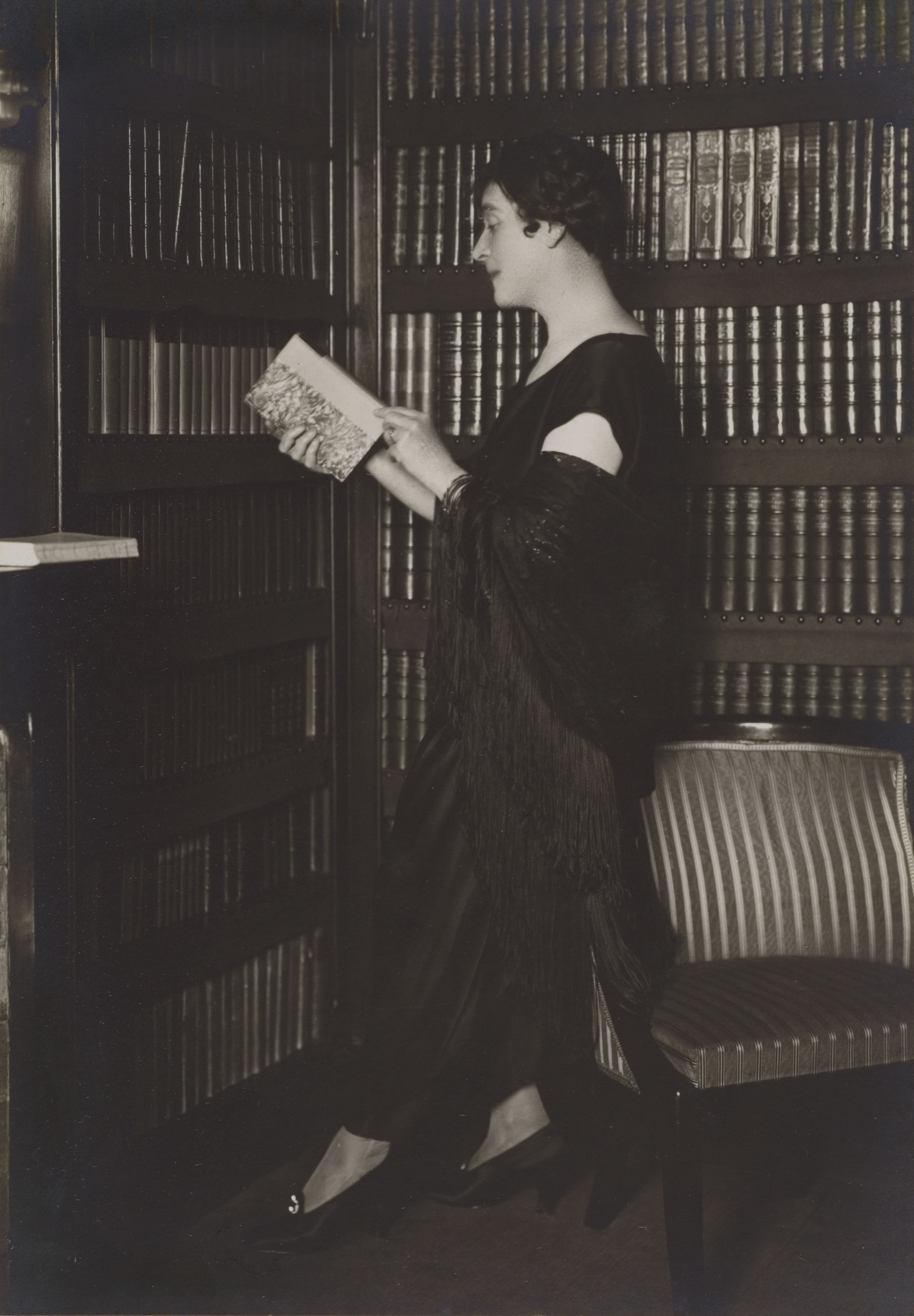
- Jane Misme by Henri Manuel (1874–1947)
- Born: 1865
- Died: 1935 (aged 69–70)
- Occupation: Journalist
- Known for: Feminism

Jane Misme (1865–1935) was a French journalist and feminist. She founded the feminist journal La Française (The Frenchwoman), published from 1906 to 1934, and was a member of the executive of the French Union for Women's Suffrage and the National Council of French Women.

== Early years ==
Jane Misme was born in 1865.

In January 1893 Jeanne Schmahl founded the Avant-Courrière (Forerunner) association, which called for the right of women to be witnesses in public and private acts, and for the right of married women to take the product of their labor and dispose of it freely. The campaign aimed to mobilize middle- and upper-class women who had moderate and conservative views. Anne de Rochechouart de Mortemart (1847–1933), Duchess of Uzès and Juliette Adam (1836–1936) soon joined the Avant-Courrière, and Schmahl found support from Jane Misme and Jeanne Chauvin (1862–1926), the first woman to become a doctor of law.

== Journalist ==
Misme became a journalist when she was about thirty years old, writing from 1896 to 1906 in newspapers such as Le Figaro, Le Matin and the Revue de Paris. Her articles covered subjects such as the social roles of women in the past, and the new careers open to women. She was also drama critic for La Fronde and L'Action from 1899 to 1905. La Fronde had been founded by the actress and suffragist Marguerite Durand in 1897. In October 1901 Misme wrote in an article on "the conception of women in French theater" for La Fronde,

Of the many things disrupting contemporary society, perhaps the most important is the transformation in the lives of women. They, who have remained the same for centuries and centuries, across all civilizations, are now in the process of no longer being the same. While the traditional woman has not yet disappeared, she has been challenged by another, baptized the New Woman. The two are in conflict and the world is fighting over them.

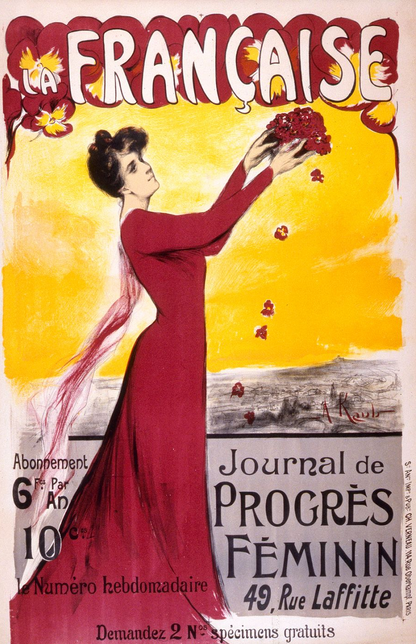
La Française 1906 poster by Alice Kaub-Casalonga (1875–1948)

La Fronde ceased publication in March 1905. Misme launched La Française (The Frenchwoman) the next year, to fill the gap. It was a four-page, large format weekly that first appeared on 21 October 1906. Cofounders included Mathilde Meliot, director if the Monde Financier, and Marguerite Durand. Germaine Dulac was a regular contributor, writing literary portraits between 1906 and 1908, and theatrical criticism from 1908 to 1913. The paper was owned by the writers through a cooperative. This parent organization, the Cercle de La Française, was described as a "home of practical and moral action for all feminine interests." Unlike La Fronde, Misme accepted men as collaborators, but refused to argue over politics or religion. The focus would be on "the situation and role of women in France and abroad." In 1908 Misme wrote that La Francaise was strongly against "violent public demonstrations" which were "essentially incompatible with French style [goût]".

La Française was intended to take a broad position linking the different republican feminist movements. In practice it became the official organ of the moderate National Council of French Women (CNFF: French: Conseil National des femmes françaises), to which many women's associations belonged. The CNFF had been formally launched on 18 April 1901. The initial committee was headed by Isabelle Bogelot and included Sarah Monod, Avril de Sainte-Croix, Julie Siegfried and Marie Bonnevial. Misme was president of the Press, Letters and Arts section of the CNFF and delegate to the presidency of the Press, Letters and Arts section of the International Council of Women.

== French Union for Women's Suffrage ==
The French Union for Women's Suffrage (UFSF) was founded by a group of feminists who had attended a national congress of French feminists in Paris in 1908. Most of them were from bourgeois or intellectual backgrounds. The leaders were Jeanne Schmahl and Jane Misme. The founding meeting of 300 women was held in February 1909. Cécile Brunschvicg (1877–1946) was made secretary-general. Schmahl was the first president. Misme was vice-president of the UFSF from 1909 to 1935. Schmahl resigned from the UFSF in 1911 due to disputes with Cécile Brunschvicg, although the reason given was health problems. Jane Misme stayed with the UFSF, which had 12,000 members by 1914.

== World War I ==
During World War I (1914–18) the motto on the banner of La Française read "Frenchwomen during the war. What they do. What we can do for them." After the outbreak of war Misme wrote in La Française, "As long as the adversity of our country endures, nobody is entitled to speak of their rights; we only have responsibilities to it." Setting aside international women's solidarity, she also wrote, "As long as the war continues, the wives of the enemy will also be the enemy." In a 1914 article Misme criticized Red Cross nurses who did not show the selfless devotion to duty the Republic required, but might be attracted by the glamor of the uniform or the potential the job offered to find a husband. She thought these women were harming the suffrage cause, since women's valiant effort during the war would be used to justify giving the vote to women after the war had ended. From 1915 Misme contributed to L'Oeuvre and Minerva.

The loss of French men during the war, or their absence in the trenches, created a drop in the birth rate and a shortage of husbands. Proposals for countering the problem included polygamy and pregnancy outside of marriage. Misme thought this was barbarous. A woman who was denied love and motherhood should be seen as a victim of war, and their sacrifice should bring honor, not disgrace. La Française said unwed motherhood was "degrading for women, humiliating for men ... noxious for the child ... dangerous for the public order and intimate happiness."

One of the issues discussed in La Française was the question of pregnancies due to rape by German soldiers. Misme was personally opposed to abortion, but urged her readers to use her correspondence page to debate the issues, and published a wide range of views from both men and women. She rejected the concept that the woman was a "shamed" victim, and called on women to bear and love their children. Misme held the maternalist view that mothers and children always deserved help and respect. She wrote, "It is with all the strength of my maternal instinct that I speak to defend, here and everywhere, the mothers and children who are treated as outcasts." If a mother abandoned the child from a wartime rape, the child was officially entitled to foster care in the normal way. Misme questioned how the foster parents would treat them if they suspected their origin. Misme published letters that insulted her, accused her of siding with the Germans and even called her a German spy.

Misme wrote an extensive article on La Guerre et le rôle des femmes in the November 1916 issue of La Revue de Paris. She noted that the French feminist societies had suspended their pacifist activities. French women had shown by their deeds that they should be treated as socially equal to men. They had taken the place of men in the factories, had taken the place of husbands and fathers in the family, and had become farmers, laborers, veterinaries, notaries, barbers and merchants of all kinds. They had filled vacant positions in schools and local administration. Before the war the feminist leaders had been treated with hostility, but now the mood had changed. Misme called for reforms in education, labor problems, marriage, charity, hygiene, social morality and politics that would demonstrate that sexual equality is triumphantly possible.

== Post-war period ==
Misme continued as an active and opinionated journalist after the war. Writing in L'Oeuvre in a 1919 editorial Misme dismissed the many "lamentations" she had heard about newly independent women who chose not to marry in the postwar period. She wrote, "Ah! The time is past when you married the first well-groomed dog that came along just to be called Madame, wear diamonds, go out alone, and in particular guarantee your daily bread. She thought that the war had accelerated a change that was already happening in the way single women were viewed. Writing in La Francaise in 1922 Misme praised the new, shorter swimsuits for allowing young women more freedom of movement in the water. She wrote, "anything that stands in the way of the harmonious and necessary development of the body can only be a false kind of grace and modesty."

In an article titled Les Provocatrices (Oeuvre, 8 November 1923) Misme claimed that the courtship relationship had changed. Instead of passively waiting to be asked for marriage, women were taking a more active role. In discussing controversy over an article on "Do Frenchwomen have to marry strangers" she wrote, "They do not have to; they can; that is very different." In Maternité: Le plus beau sport (Oeuvre, 29 November 1923) Misme objected to the spread of the ideas of Sigmund Freud in France, saying his theories were very controversial, and were largely in vogue due to fashion. Under the Law of 10 August 1927 French women married to non-naturalized foreigners could retain their citizenship, their children were considered French and their husbands could now become eligible for citizenship in three years rather than ten. Odette Simon of the UFSF noted that "the essential goal of this law is to increase as much as possible the number of French men and women." However, Misme praised the law as an attack on the concept of "marital supremacy," where a woman was subordinate to her husband, and thus another step in the process of reform that had started with the married women's property law of 1907.

By 1926 La Française had been transferred from the CNFF to the affiliated French Union for Women's Suffrage (UFSF: Union française pour le suffrage des femmes). Misme often published short biographies of suffragists in La Francaise and Minerva, creating a useful resource for historians of the women's movement in France. She wrote a series of articles on "The Great Figures of Feminism" for Minerva. An article published on 30 November 1930 described the achievements of Avril de Sainte-Croix, who was 75 years old, but despite illness and fragility was "a permanent miracle of vitality and energy." She said Sainte-Croix had been born to lead, was the undisputed leader of French feminism and one of the leaders of international feminism.

Jane Misme died in 1935.

== Selected publications ==
- Jane Misme (1900). Les Héroïnes historiques au théâtre Charlotte Corday. p. 10.
- Mme. Jane Misme (1909). Pour le suffrage des femmes ... Par la française. p. 40.
- Jane Misme (1917). Les derniers maitres d'Urville: histoire d'une famille messine.

== Sources ==
- Allen, Ann Taylor (2005-07-01). Feminism and Motherhood in Western Europe, 1890-1970: The Maternal Dilemma. Palgrave Macmillan. ISBN 978-1-4039-8143-1.
- Camiscioli, Elisa (1999). "Intermarriage, Independent Nationality, and the Individual Rights of French Women: The Law of 10 August 1927". French Politics, Culture & Society. 17 (3/4 Summer/Fall 1999, Special Issue: The Politics of the Family in France). Berghahn Books: 52–74. doi:10.3167/153763799782378320. JSTOR 42843081.
- Comité d’initiative, CNFF (10 April 1901), Procès-verbal, Conseil national des femmes françaises, Centre des Archives du Féminisme 2 AF 3
- "Current Opinion". The Biblical World. 49 (2). The University of Chicago Press: 108–111. February 1917. doi:10.1086/475695. JSTOR 3136465. S2CID 222435669.
- Fell, Alison S. (2007). "Fallen Angels? The Red Cross Nurse in French First World War Discourse". The Resilient Female Body: Health and Malaise in Twentieth-century France. Peter Lang. ISBN 978-3-03910-521-2.
- Grayzel, Susan R. (February 1997). "Mothers, Marraines, and Prostitutes: Morale and Morality in First World War France". The International History Review. 19 (1). Taylor & Francis: 66–82. doi:10.1080/07075332.1997.9640775. JSTOR 40108084.
- Hause, Steven C. (2002). "Union Française Pour Le Suffrage Des Femmes (UFSF)". In Helen Tierney (ed.). Women's Studies Encyclopedia. Greenwood Press.
- Hause, Steven C.; Kenney, Anne R. (October 1981). "The Limits of Suffragist Behavior: Legalism and Militancy in France, 1876-1922". The American Historical Review. 86 (4). Oxford University Press on behalf of the American Historical Association: 781–806. doi:10.1086/ahr/86.4.781. JSTOR 1860134.
- "Historique". CNFF. Archived from the original on 2015-04-02.
- "Jane Misme". Archives du Féminisme.
- Metz, Annie (December 2007). "Jeanne Schmahl et la loi sur le libre salaire de la femme". Bulletin du Archives du Féminisme (in French) (13). Archived from the original on 2019-05-04.
- "New Woman's Paper In France". The Daily Republican. Monongahela, Pennsylvania: 2. 1907-01-07 – via Newspapers.com.
- Offen, Karen (December 2005). "La plus grande féministe de France ». Mais qui est donc Madame Avril de Sainte-Croix ?". Bulletin Archives du féminisme (in French) (9). Archived from the original on 2014-10-13.
- Roberts, Mary Louise (2002-10-01). Disruptive Acts: The New Woman in Fin-de-Siecle France. University of Chicago Press. ISBN 978-0-226-72124-8.
- Shearer, Joanna (2007). "French Women's First World war Political Journalism: War's Impact on the female Body". The Resilient Female Body: Health and Malaise in Twentieth-century France. Peter Lang. ISBN 978-3-03910-521-2.
- Tartakowsky, Danielle (2015). "Les françaises veulent voter". L’Histoire par l’image (in French).
- "The Woman Movement In France and Its Leader". The Brooklyn Daily Eagle. New York. 1911-09-04 – via newspapers.com.
- Williams, Tami Michelle (2007). Beyond Impressions: The Life and Films of Germaine Dulac from Aesthetics to Politics. ISBN 978-0-549-44079-6.
