= Isabelle Bogelot =

French philanthropist and feminist

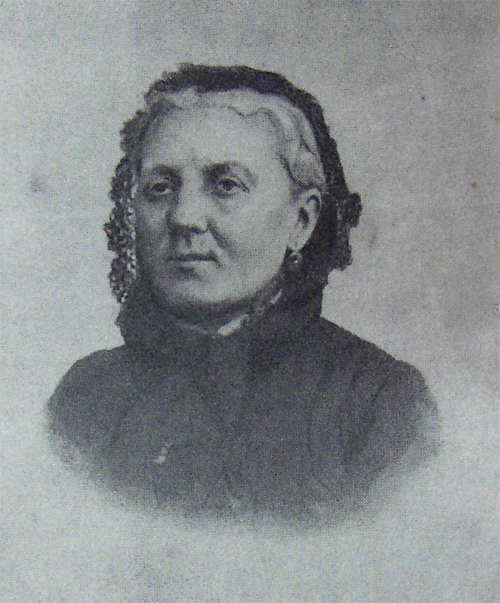
- Born: Isabelle Amélie Cottiaux; May 11, 1838; Paris, France
- Died: June 14, 1923 (aged 85); Boulogne-sur-Seine, France
- Occupation: Philanthropist

Signature
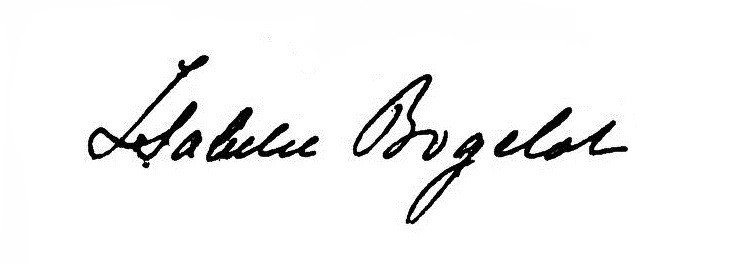

Isabelle Bogelot (11 May 1838 - 14 June 1923) was a French philanthropist and feminist.

== Biography ==
Born Isabelle Amélie Cottiaux in Paris, Bogelot was the daughter of Antoine André Cottiaux, a cotton trader, and Marie Anne Thérèse Cottiaux, from Cambrai. Orphaned at a young age (her father died when she was 2 and her mother when she was 4), she was adopted by the family of the sisters, Maria Deraismes and Anna Féresse-Deraismes.

On May 7, 1864, she married Gustave Bogelot, a lawyer for the Court of Appeal of Paris. The couple had at least two children. This was the beginning of a long collaboration, similar to that of the couple Jules and Julie Siegfried. Her husband, who wrote several works on the question of prisons, was very involved in philanthropic activity: he was the secretary of the Société générale des prisons, vice-president of the Commission of the Hospice of Boulogne-sur-Seine for over 20 years, member of the board of directors of the Œuvre des libérées de Saint-Lazare from 1890, and spokesperson for that organisation at various congresses. When he died in 1902, Isabelle Bogelot stated that they did “nothing without considering it together”.

== Philanthropy ==
Although she was first made aware of feminist issues in Maria Deraismes's family, and later of social issues by her husband, Isabelle Bogelot considered that she only had a “philanthropic revelation” in 1876, when her husband brought her a bulletin of the Œuvre des libérées de Saint-Lazare. She then realized that it was her duty – in her own words – to devote herself to these issues. Two days later, she attended one of the charity's meetings and met Émilie de Morsier and Sarah Monod.

The Œuvre des libérées de Saint-Lazare, or Society for Women Freed from Saint-Lazare, created in 1870 by Pauline Grandpré, aimed to help women and children freed from prisons, in order to protect them from recidivism: “helping women in the present, thinking about their future by educating them, providing them a livelihood and increasing their dignity through work”.

Two years later, she became the deputy to Caroline de Barrau, followed by director general of the Œuvre in 1887. From 1883 onwards, temporary shelters were created to house women and their children upon leaving prison. The charity was recognized as a public interest organization on 26 January 1885.

The Franco-Prussian War led her to become interested in the efforts to help the military wounded. In 1886, she obtained the second prize for her nursing diploma, and a paramedic diploma the following year (both programmes created by the Women's Union of France).

She also founded, with Maria Martin and Émilie de Morsier, the Women's League for Peace and Union Among Peoples. She died in Boulogne-sur-Seine.

== Feminism ==
Bogelot's role in the Œuvre des libérées de Saint-Lazare propelled her to the international scene, where she represented the organisation at various events:

- 1884: Congress of the International Abolitionist Federation in Basel;
- 1885: International Penitentiary Congress in Rome;
- 1888: Suffragist Congress in Washington, D.C. The delegate of her organisation, Isabelle Bogelot was elected treasurer of the International Council of Women, founded at this event. She would become its vice president at the beginning of the 20th Century;
- 1889: International Congress of Women in Paris. She was vice-president;
- 1893: Chicago World's Fair. She was a member of the committee presided over by Cécile Carnot for the women's exposition. The International Congress of Women was held concurrently.

Isabelle Bogelot was equally a major figure on the French feminist scene. In 1889, she and Émilie de Morsier organised the first congress of women's organisations and institutions, held in Paris on the margins of the Exposition Universelle. Sarah Monod was also a member of the congress committee chaired by Jules Simon. Losing no momentum, they created the Conference of Versailles, designed to gather “all women interested in philanthropy” each year. The meeting was international, hosting women from all over Europe and the United States as well as from Africa.

Bridging French and American feminists, Isabelle Bogelot, supported by the President of the International Council of Women May Wright Sewall, convened an initiative committee to form the French section of the international association, the National Council of French Women, of which Sarah Monod was the president, and Isabelle Bogelot the honorary president. In 1906, the Assistance Section, led by Eugénie Weill, won one of the council's first fights: Isabelle Bogelot became the first woman appointed to the National Supreme Council for Assistance and Public Health.

== Distinctions ==
On January 1, 1889, she received the Ordre des Palmes académiques for the creation of temporary shelters. On May 2, 1894, she became a chevalier of the Legion of Honour.

== Bibliography ==
- Laurence Klejman, Florence Rochefort, L'égalité en marche. Le féminisme sous la III^{e} République, Paris, Des femmes, 1989 ISBN 2-7210-0382-8
- Geneviève Poujol, Un féminisme sous tutelle : les protestantes françaises, 1810-1960, Paris, les Éditions de Paris, 2003 (ISBN 978-2846210317)
- Christine Bard, Les femmes dans la société française, Paris, Armand Colin, 2001
