= Camille Dreyfus =

Camille Dreyfus may refer to:

- Camille Ferdinand Dreyfus (1849–1915), French lawyer and politician
- Camille Dreyfus (chemist) (1878–1956), Swiss-American chemist, inventor and businessman
  - The Camille and Henry Dreyfus Foundation
- Ferdinand-Camille Dreyfus (1851–1915), French journalist and politician
