= Tableau politique de la France de l'Ouest sous la Troisième République =

1913 work of André Siegfried

The Tableau politique de la France de l'Ouest sous la Troisième République (Political Table of Western France under the Third Republic) is a work of the French sociologist, geographer, and historian André Siegfried, published on the eve of the First World War, in 1913. It is considered the founding book of sociological analysis of elections not only in France but also in the world.

== Siegfried's thesis: the influence of geology on the behaviour of voters ==
Geological map of western France

In this book, the author analyses the influence of geographical and social determinants (structure of ownership, relation to authority, the influence of traditional structures) on the vote of the inhabitants of fifteen departments in western France. He thus compares different territorial units by postulating that there is a correlation between the social structures that are anchored in the local geography and the behaviour of the voters. Under this approach, and based on an old French saying that "the limestone gave the teacher and granite the priest", Siegfried then establishes a direct relationship between the geography of the Vendée and the vote of the people. In the geological division of the territory (in the north of the department, the granite bocage, to the south the calcareous plain), it is possible to superimpose according to him a division of the electoral behaviours. The very nature of the granitic soil favours the dispersal of the habitation, the rurality, the large landed property and Catholicism. All these factors, arising indirectly from the nature of the soil, may contribute to explaining the right-wing vote in northern Vendée at the time. On the contrary, the limestone soil favours a more restricted habitat, urbanity, small property and petite bourgeoisie. The role of the Church is less central in these areas. So the data may explain that the south of the Vendée department voted then (during the first years of the Third Republic) to the political left, that is to say in contrast to the north of the department. This work also explains the partition of the Vendée between the Republican south and the monarchist north during the French Revolution.

== Reception, criticism, and posterity ==
The Siegfried analysis has often been reduced to "granite votes right, limestone votes left", which led to the work being decried as too simplistic by Raymond Aron ("on trouve l’hétérogénéité géographique quand on la cherche, on trouve les deux blocs quand on les organise"). Half a century later, in the Western Peasants, the historian Paul Bois fleshed out Siegfried's analysis on the basis of "this suggested idea of Siegfried, by the failure of the study of the past is essential to understanding the present", and by paying more attention to the weight of traditions inherited from the local French Revolution.

== Editions ==
- Tableau politique de la France de l’ouest sous la troisième république. 102 maps and sketches, 1 map without text, Paris: Armand Colin, 1913; rpt. Brussels: Éditions de l'Université de Bruxelles, 2010 ISBN 978-2-8004-1473-7
- Tableau politique de la France de l’ouest sous la troisième république. 102 maps and sketches, 1 map without text, Paris: Armand Colin, 1913; rpt. Paris: Impr. Nationale éditions, 1995 ISBN 9782743300036

== Bibliography ==
- Michel Bussi, Christophe Le Digol & Christophe Voilliot (eds.), Le Tableau politique de la France de l’Ouest d’André Siegfried. 100 ans après. Héritages et postérités, Rennes: Presses universitaires de Rennes, 2016 ISBN 978-2-7535-4902-9
