= Marie Maugeret =

French novelist (1844–1928)

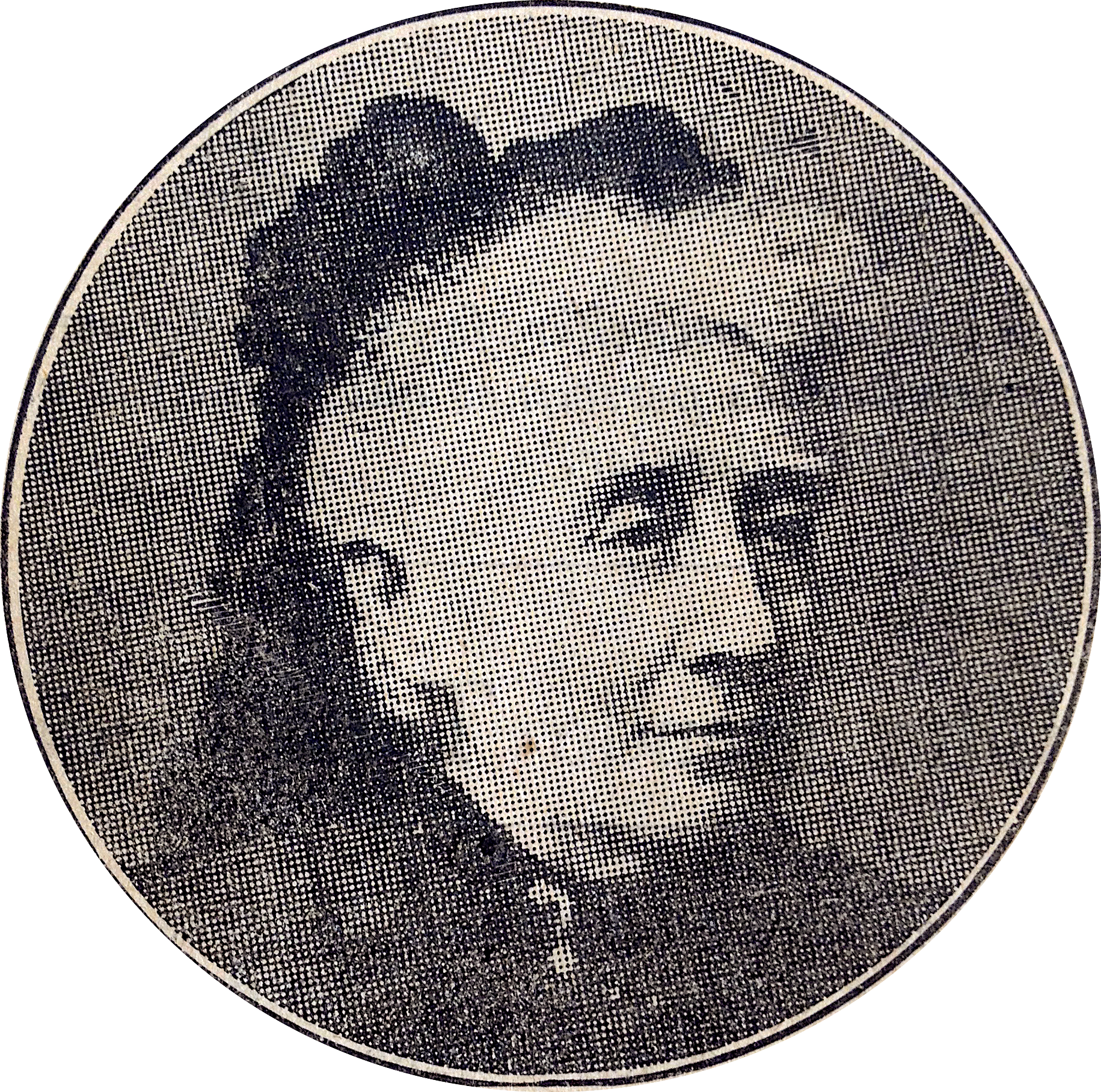
- Portrait of Maugeret
- Born: 1844; Le Mans, France
- Died: 1928 (aged 83–84)
- Occupation: Novelist
- Known for: Christian feminism

Marie Maugeret (1844–1928) was a French novelist and conservative Catholic who became a feminist and was active in promoting Christian feminism as an antidote to socialism.

== Early years ==
Marie Maugeret came from Le Mans, Sarthe. She was born in 1844, daughter of a doctor, and was given a conventional girl's education at an Ursuline convent. She inherited an income that allowed her to live comfortably without working. She published several novels, a book of Pensées, and an attack on Martin Luther's Protestant movement, with a defense of Catholic orthodoxy as represented by the Jesuit Ignatius of Loyola. She founded the journal L'Echo littéraire de France, Sciences, arts, littérature in 1883 and directed a printing house in Paris.

Maugeret attended an international congress on women's rights in Paris in 1896. She disagreed with the positions of many of the attendees on subjects like birth control and divorce, but was in favor of improving the rights of women while conforming to conservative Catholic principles. She wanted to bring women who thought as she did into public life to defend the state against socialism and strengthen the role of the church.

== Christian feminism ==
Maugeret founded the Christian Feminism (Le Féminisme crétien) organization in 1896, and launched a magazine with the same name. She devoted the rest of her life to this cause. Maugeret's Christian feminism defended the family as the "basic social cell", and thought that mothers should stay at home, but fought for the rights of women who were forced to work. In 1901 the National Council of French Women (Conseil National des Femmes Français) was founded, headed by Sarah Monod. The majority of the members were moderate bourgeois republicans. The socialists led by Louise Saumoneau and Élisabeth Renaud were a tiny minority on the left of this movement. They were balanced by the Catholic Right led by Marie Maugeret.

In 1902 Maugeret founded the Fédération Jeanne d'Arc (Federation of Joan of Arc), which sponsored congresses of Catholic women's organizations. At these congresses Maugeret did whatever she could to gain a vote in favor of women's suffrage. She was supported by La Femme contemporaine, an anti-semitic and anti-Dreyfus newspaper. Joan of Arc was used as a symbol for women's emancipation that glossed over the fact that the church was officially opposed to women's suffrage. The annual Congrès Jeanne d'Arc was ostensibly concerned with working for Joan's canonization, but also discussed social concerns such as education, women's rights and women's working conditions. In 1906 it endorsed women's suffrage for a short period. The Joan of Arc movement was anti-Semitic and anti-republican. Christian feminists formed a national union of French women fighting the "Jewish peril" and freethought.

The Fédération Jeanne d'Arc encompassed women's groups with diverse opinions. Jeanne Lestra (1864-1951) founded the League of French Women (Ligue des femmes françaises, LFF) on 29 September 1901 at Lyon. The LFF participated in the 25–26 May 1904 congress of Jeanne d'Arc at the Catholic Institute, but the next year the countess of Saint-Laurent made it clear that the LFF remained independent of the Fédération Jeanne d'Arc, saying that federation did not mean fusion. The LFF criticized Maugeret for talking too much about rights and not enough about religion and the rights of God. The Patriotic League of Frenchwomen (Ligue patriotique des Françaises, LPDF) was founded on 21 May 1902 by a Paris-based LFF splinter group who were suspicious of royalist tendencies among the Lyon members. Although the LPDF also participated in the congresses of Jeanne d'Arc, it was not truly feminist and was opposed to women's suffrage.

The Catholic women feminists became a strong force in France after Pope Benedict XV approved women's suffrage in 1919, but opposition from male politicians delayed women gaining the vote until 1944.

Marie Maugeret did not marry. She died in 1928.

== Views ==
Marie Maugeret was ultramontane in her religious views, a staunchly conservative Catholic. Politically, she was on the nationalist eight. She was rabidly antisemitic, as shown by her stance during the Dreyfus affair. She thought that the main role of a woman was to be a wife and mother, but said that women wanted "the right to be what we are: human beings gifted with intelligence as well as heart, not identical with, but equal to men, as capable as they are, and sometimes more capable, of taking on, always more conscientiously and with a greater sense of duty, not only the lowly positions they scorn, but the majority of those over which they have until now maintained a monopoly." She saw the control that husbands took over their wife's property at marriage as a social injustice.

== Bibliography ==
- Maugeret, Marie (1881). Protestation de Mlle Maugeret en faveur de l'enseignement donné par la congrégation de Sainte-Ursule au Mans. Impr. de Leguicheux-Gallienne.
- Maugeret, Marie (1881). L'Attaque et la défense : Luther et Loyola, par Mlle Marie Maugeret. Leguicheux-Gallienne.
- Maugeret, Marie (1888). Le Château des Ravenelles, histoire d'une famille écossaise, suivi de les Trois Jeanne, épisode de l'histoire de Bretagne, par Mlle Marie Maugeret. A. Mame et fils.
- Maugeret, Marie (1888). Les Principes de la baronne. Impr. Bonne-Nouvelle.
- Maugeret, Marie (1899). L'abbé Zola à Lourdes. Tolra.
- Maugeret, Marie (1890). Le Couvent des carmes et ses martyrs. impr. de M. Maugeret.
- Maugeret, Marie; Blanchecotte, Augustine Malvine (1892). Grains de sable. impr. de M. Maugeret.
- Maugeret, Marie (1892). Kermor, roman de moeurs aristocratiques. Chamuel.
- Maugeret, Marie (1895). La Science à travers les champs, par Mlle Marie Maugeret... A. Mame.
- Maugeret, Marie; Le Roy Liberge (1929). Une femme d'oeuvres moderne. Montligeon.
