= Adrienne Weill =

French physicist (1903–1979)

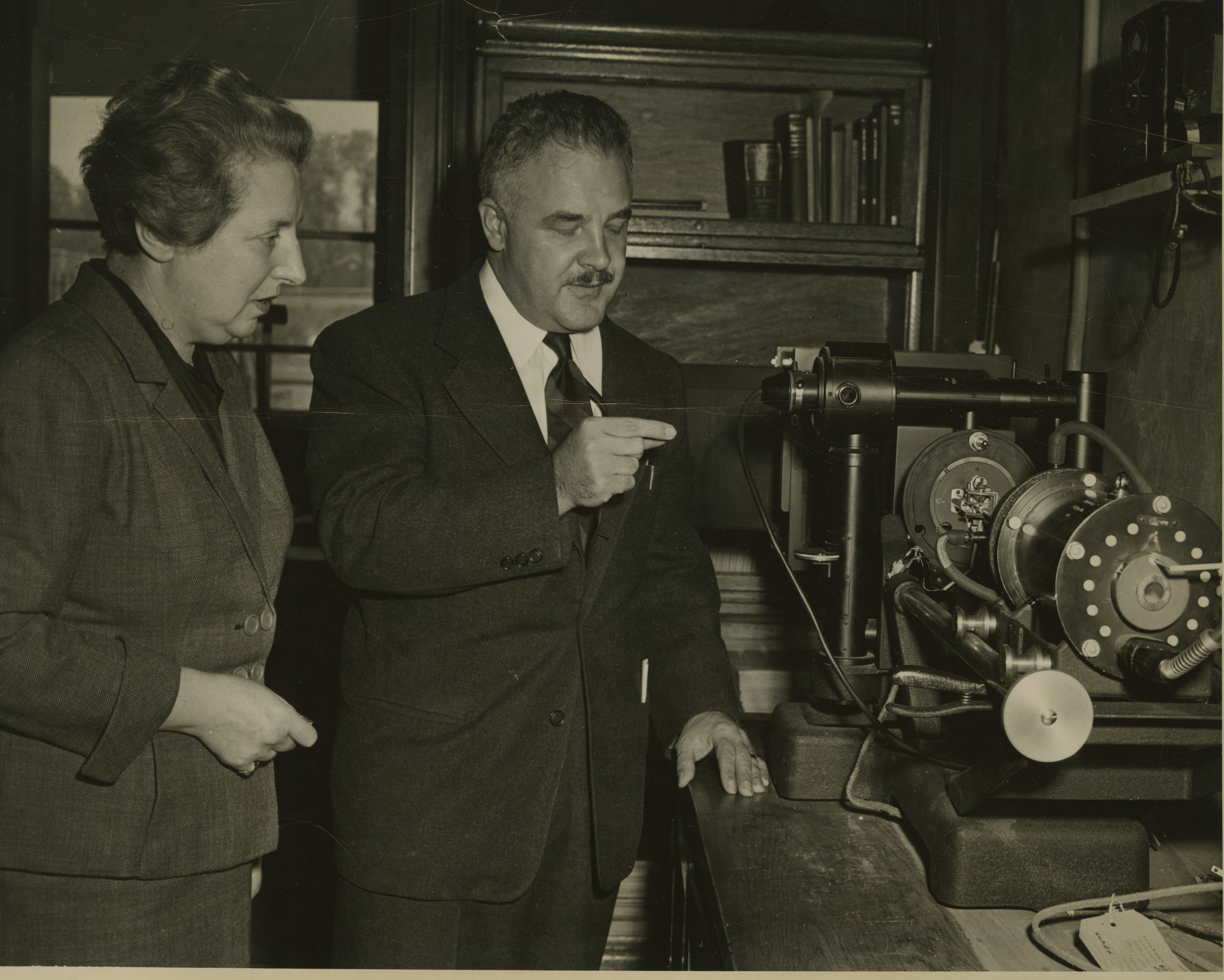
- Adrienne Weill with the metallurgist John Phillip Nielsen in NYU's College of Engineering
- Born: 28 June 1903
- Died: 3 June 1979 (aged 75)
- Scientific career
- Fields: crystallography
- Workplaces: Cavendish Laboratory

Adrienne Sarah Céline Weill (née Brunschvicg, 28 June 1903 – 3 June 1979) was a French scientist who became a close associate of Marie Curie, working in her Paris laboratory from 1925. In 1940, she moved to England with the Free French forces and worked on crystallography with Lawrence Bragg at the Cavendish Laboratory in Cambridge. In 1946, she returned to France to work as an engineer in the laboratories of the French Navy. She later worked for the Association française des femmes diplômées des universités where she became vice-president.

== Early life ==
Adrienne Sarah Céline Brunschvicq was born on 28 June 1903 in the 16th arrondissement of Paris. Born into a Jewish family her parents were the philosopher Léon Brunschvicg and the prominent feminist activist Cécile Brunschvicg. She was one of the family's four children. On 22 March 1926, she married the mining engineer Robert Moïse Weill with whom she had a daughter. He died on 29 July 1928, aged 25 in Paris.

== Career ==
Little is known of Adrienne Brunschvicq's early education but various records confirm that as the widowed Adrienne Weill she was a talented student of Marie Curie from 1936. Curie became her PhD supervisor. In 1940, as a result of the Nazi occupation of France, Weill fled to England where she made herself available to the Free French Forces. She became a resident of Newnham College, Cambridge, and joined Lawrence Bragg at the Cavendish Laboratory where she helped with research on crystallography. There, while giving a lecture on the work of Marie Curie, she met Rosalind Franklin who became a good friend and scientific associate. In particular, at a conference in the autumn of 1946, Weill introduced Franklin to Marcel Mathieu who was responsible for much of the scientific research undertaken in France. As a result, Franklin embarked on a highly successful scientific career in X-ray crystallography.

After the end of the Second World War she helped with the repatriation of French citizens before returning to France herself. There she joined the French navy's laboratories as an engineer, working primarily on various research projects involving special metals. She also took an interest in ancient metals, assisting work in the laboratories of the Louvre Museum.

As a widowed mother with a young daughter, she soon joined the Association française des femmes diplômées des universités (French Association for Women with University Diplomas), first as a board member and conference delegate, later as vice-president.

On 3 June 1979, Adrienne Weill died in the 14th arrondissement of Paris, aged 75.

== See also ==
- List of women associated with Marie Curie and Irène Joliot-Curie
