= Gabrielle Alphen-Salvador =

French philanthropist, feminist and pacifist

- Born: Léa Miriam Thérèse Gabrielle Salvador; 1 April 1856; Paris
- Died: 15 June 1920 (aged 64); Ballan-Miré, Indre-et-Loire
- Known for: Philanthropist, feminist, suffragist, pacifist

Thérèse Léa Maryvonne Gabrielle Alphen-Salvador (1 April 1856 –15 June 1920) was a French philanthropist, feminist suffragist and pacifist. From the 1890s she was active in the women's movement, becoming one of the founders of the National Council of French Women (Conseil national des femmes françaises) in 1901 and later participating in the French Union for Women's Suffrage (Union française pour le suffrage des femmes). She is remembered above all for helping to establish the École professionnelle d'assistance aux malades, France's first school for nurses. As the institution's president from 1900 to 1920, she was instrumental in its further development.

== Biography ==
Born on 1 April 1856 in Paris, Thérèse Léa Maryvonne Gabrielle Salvador was the daughter of Daniél Lévi Salvador, generally known as Gabriel Salvador, and Séphora Adamine Crémieux. In March 1878, she married the banker Émile Alphen who died in 1891. From then on she lived with her sister Margueritte Brandon in a large Paris apartment. becoming a prominent socialite. They held a salon, inviting scientific and cultural figures, including the author André Gide and the politician Eugène Rouart.

In 1900, following the death of her mother, Alphen-Salvador financed the establishment of the first nursing school in France, originally known as the Association pour le développement de l'assistance aux malades (ADAM).

She took a wide interest in the women's movement, becoming one of the three vice-presidents of the Comité exécutif des femmes françaises founded in April 1901. When the National Council of French Women (Conseil national des femmes françaises) was re-organized in 1901, she first headed the section on education and then the section on health, working alongside Eugénie Weill in the field of public health.

From 1914 to 1919, she served on the board of the International Council of Women. She was also honorary president of the Union des françaises contre l'alcool (Union of French Women against Alcohol) and was a member of the French Union for Women's Suffrage (Union française pour le suffrage des femmes). Alphen-Salvador was one of the delegates at the Inter-Allied Women's Conference held in Paris from 10 February 1919 to develop women's topics for the Paris Peace Conference.

Gabrielle Alphen-Salvador died on 15 June 1920 at Ballan-Miré, Indre-et-Loire. She is buried in the family tomb in the local cemetery.
