= Marguerite de Witt-Schlumberger =

French suffragist

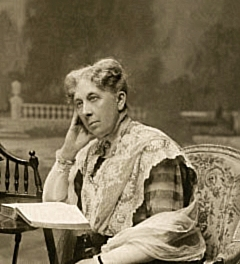
- Marguerite de Witt-Schlumberger photo-portrait from 'Le Pays de France', 5 July 1919
- Born: Marguerite de Witt-Guizot; 20 January 1853; Paris, France
- Died: 23 October 1924 (aged 71); Saint-Ouen-le-Pin, France
- Occupations: Philanthropist and campaigner for: Pronatalism; Alcoholic abstinence; Feminism; Women's suffrage
- Spouse: Paul Schlumberger (1848–1926)
- Children: Jean Schlumberger (1877–1968); Conrad Schlumberger (1878–1936); Daniel Schlumberger (1879–1915); Pauline Schlumberger (1883–1973); Marcel Schlumberger (1884–1953); Maurice Schlumberger (1886–1977)
- Parent(s): Conrad de Witt; Henriette Guizot de Witt

Marguerite de Witt-Schlumberger (20 January 1853 – 23 October 1924) was a French campaigner for pronatalism, alcoholic abstinence, and feminism. She was the president of the French Union for Women's Suffrage (Union française pour le suffrage des femmes / UFSF) movement. She married into the Schlumberger family and became a powerfully influential matriarch and the mother of several sons who achieved notability in their own right. An activist in international women's rights circles, Witt-Schlumberger was a leading suffragist at the Paris Peace Conference in 1919. For her active involvement and service to the government, she was awarded the Croix of the French Legion of Honour in 1920.

== Early life and education ==
Marguerite de Witt was the daughter of Conrad de Witt, a mayor of Saint-Ouen-le-Pin who later became a conservative deputy representing the Calvados Department in the French National Assembly. The name "de Witt" disclosed the family's Dutch origins, as a result of which they also were members of France's minority Protestant community. Marguerite's mother, Henriette Guizot de Witt, was a prolific novelist who, as the daughter of prime minister François Guizot, also came from a leading family of French Protestants.

Marguerite and her sister, Jeanne, were educated by their mother. While girls, they lived in a family environment in which they were surrounded by cousins. Along with members of the extended de Witt-Guizot families, there was an abundance of Broglie relatives as well as some of the younger kinsfolk of George Hamilton-Gordon, 4th Earl of Aberdeen, who was a family friend of the Guizots.

== Career ==
=== Social purity work ===
Marguerite and Jeanne participated actively in their mother's philanthropic ventures. In 1865 a "workplace" for young girls was opened at Le Val Richer, a former abbey that had been a Guizot family property since 1836. Five years later, a children's asylum was added.

For twenty years Marguerite served as a Protestant prison visitor, becoming associated with the campaign led by the abolitionist Protestant philanthropist Sarah Monod on behalf of "fallen women" detained in the Hospital-prison of Saint-Lazare. During that time, she married Paul Schlumberger (1876).

She took over her mother's work that involved the rehabilitation of prostitutes. She campaigned with energy for the abolition of "regulated prostitution" and presided over the International Commission for a Single Standard of Morality and Against the White Slave Trade.

She was also vigorous in her campaigning against alcohol abuse and was a member of the National League against Alcoholism. In her hometown (after 1876) of Guebwiller, she opened two "tea-total" cabarets where revelers could drink broth in place of beer. She was on record as suggesting that one should neither drink alcohol nor offer [alcoholic] drinks to visitors.

=== Suffrage ===
Like many who were involved in the 19th-century social purity movement, Witt-Schlumberger moved into feminism at the turn of the century. The moral crusades of earlier decades had opened discussion on previously taboo topics, such as legal double standards for men and women. From 1913, she served as the president of the French Union for Women's Suffrage (Union française pour le suffrage des femmes / UFSF). and urged women during World War I to move into the workplace while men were fighting in the war. Julie Siegfried served as the President along with Witt-Schlumberger. Both had sons in the military, making their pleas to support the war effort effective. Recognizing that international support might further their cause, feminists added suffrage to the agenda of the 1913 International Congress on Women's Charities and Institutions meeting in Paris. The following year, Witt-Schlumberger was in Rome meeting with women from the International Women's Suffrage Alliance (IWSA). By 1917, de Witt-Schlumberger had become a vice president of the IWSA.

=== World War I ===
Wives and other women in the Protestant Church assumed leadership roles while the men were away in combat. Witt- Schlumberger reached out to these women, in 1916, to hear about their experiences in relation to the Protestant Church. She published stories of women who had taken over religious leadership roles to inspire the morale of other women at home. The work that Witt-Schulmberger accomplished showed women as both mothers and heads of the household, and aided the image of French women.

In 1917, suffragists presented a petition to the Chamber of Deputies asking for voting equality in return for the work women had done during the war. Although it passed in the Chamber in 1922, three years after it was introduced, the Senate shelved the legislation and Witt-Schlumberger vowed to fight on.

=== Inter-Allied Women's Conference (1919) ===
Early in 1918, Witt-Schlumberger personally wrote to President Wilson thanking him for his words of support for women's suffrage in the United States and asking him to declare publicly that women's enfranchisement was necessary for a lasting peace. President Wilson responded by issuing a public statement declaring his support for the women's political agenda. Witt-Schlumberger responded for the last time after the end of the war asking the President to uphold his word at the upcoming Paris Peace Conference.

At the end of the wartime, when world leaders and diplomats at the Paris Peace Conference of 1919 were debating the terms of peace, Witt-Schlumberger proposed that women's issues become part of the treaty process to ensure international rights. Witt-Schlumberger's French Union for Women's Suffrage, with help from the National Council of French Women, invited Allied suffragists to meet in Paris in a parallel conference known as the Inter-Allied Women's Conference, which opened on 10 February 1919. Drawing delegates from Allied countries aligned with the IWSA, the conference proposed to U.S. President Woodrow Wilson and Prime Minister of France, Georges Clemenceau, that women be appointed to participate on advisory committees to the conference and be allowed to present a plea for women's equality. Women eventually were given leave to make presentations to the League of Nations Commission and to the Labor Commission. On 10 April 1919 the women made their presentation to the League of Nations Commission arguing that all League positions be open to women on equal terms with men. They asked for trafficking of women and children to be banned, for education to be a protected right, and for global suffrage to be recognized in principle. Several of their ideas were incorporated into the final treaty.

=== Post-War ===
In 1920, Witt-Schlumberger was appointed as the sole female member of the Conseil supérieur de la Natalité (CSN) (Birth Council) and argued that women should be able to protect themselves from diseased or unfit fathers. That same year, she was awarded the Croix of the French Legion of Honour for her active involvement and service to the government. In 1923, when Carrie Chapman Catt stepped down as president of the International Women's Suffrage Alliance, Witt-Schlumberger was seen by many as her successor. Though elected, she declined the post, citing health reasons.

== Personal life ==
Marguerite de Witt married Paul Schlumberger (1848–1926) on 30 June 1876. He was from a family of Protestant industrialists who traced their wealth back to Paul's grandfather, Nicolas Schlumberger (1782–1867), who had made a fortune as a textiles (cotton) baron. Records indicate that Marguerite gave birth to five sons and one daughter, born in Guebwiller (Alsace). The eldest son, Jean (1877–1968), achieved fame as a journalist and writer. Conrad and Marcel Schlumberger qualified as a physicist and engineer, respectively, becoming noteworthy for their inventions in the fields of geophysics and petroleum technology. In 1926 these two founded what in 2012 became the world's largest oilfield services company. Another son, Daniel Schlumberger, was killed in the First World War.

Although Marguerite was from western France, her husband's family was from Alsace, which had become part of Germany following frontier changes mandated in 1871. After 1871 it was not practical to move the family's large factories across the new frontier into France, and to do so would have involved leaving large numbers of factory employees behind, rendering them jobless in Alsace. Her children, therefore, were born in the recently unified German state, however, as each of her sons neared the age of 15, the age at which they could have faced conscription into the German army, Marguerite moved them out of Alsace and into France. By doing so, she achieved further plaudits from those sources favouring the French national version of history, because in her home town near Mulhouse she became an "upper-class [French] patriot", leading "passive resistance" against what Francophone commentators tended to identify as German occupation.

She died 23 October 1924.
