= Saint-Ouen-le-Pin =

- Commune
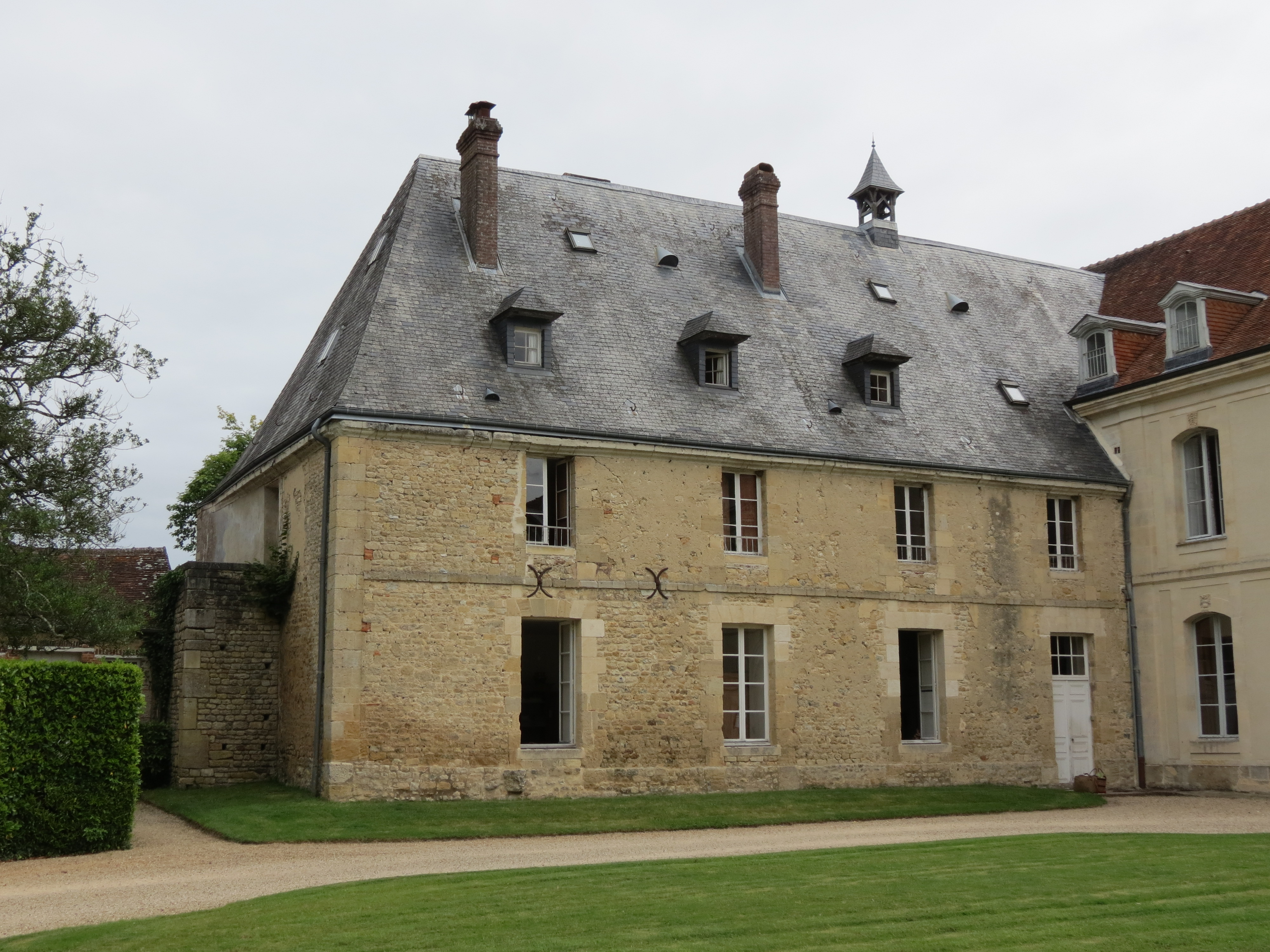
- The abbey of Val-Richer
- Location of Saint-Ouen-le-Pin
- Location within France Location within Normandy
- Coordinates: 49°08′56″N 0°06′27″E
- Country: France
- Region: Normandy
- Department: Calvados
- Arrondissement: Lisieux
- Canton: Mézidon Vallée d'Auge
- Intercommunality: CA Lisieux Normandie

Government
  - Mayor (2020–2026): Paul Cléradin
- Area^{1}: 5.59 km^{2} (2.16 sq mi)
- Elevation: 36 m (118 ft)
- Highest elevation: 166 m (545 ft)
- Lowest elevation: 94 m (308 ft)
- Population (2023): 250
  - Density: 45/km^{2} (120/sq mi)
- Time zone: UTC+01:00 (CET)
  - Summer (DST): UTC+02:00 (CEST)
- INSEE/Postal code: 14639 /14340
- ^{1} French Land Register data, which excludes lakes, ponds, glaciers > 1 km^{2} (0.386 sq mi or 247 acres) and river estuaries.

Saint-Ouen-le-Pin (French pronunciation: [sɛ̃.t‿wɛ̃ lə pɛ̃]) is a commune in the Calvados department in the Normandy region in northwestern France.

== Population ==
Historical population
Year	Pop.	±% p.a.
1968	201	—
1975	211	+0.70%
1982	226	+0.99%
1990	276	+2.53%
1999	267	−0.37%
2007	302	+1.55%
2012	273	−2.00%
2017	259	−1.05%
2023	250	−0.59%
Source: INSEE

== See also ==
- Communes of the Calvados department
