= Camille Ferdinand Dreyfus =

French lawyer and historian

- Born: 5 May 1849; Paris, France
- Died: 15 July 1915 (aged 66); Paris, France
- Occupation: Lawyer
- Known for: Senator of Seine-et-Oise (1909-1915)

Camille Ferdinand Dreyfus (5 May 1849 - 15 July 1915) was a French lawyer, historian and philanthropist who became Senator for Seine-et-Oise from 1909 to 1915.

== Career ==
Ferdinand Dreyfus was born in Paris on 5 May 1849. He became a lawyer and editor of Le Siècle (The Century). On 14 March 1880 he was elected to parliament in a by-election as deputy for the arrondissement of Rambouillet, taking his seat on the left. He was reelected on 21 August 1881, joining the Union républicaine (Republican Union) party. He was associated with Léon Gambetta. He voted with the opportunistic Republican majority on all issues. In the general elections of 4 October 1885 he ran on the opportunistic Republican list. He failed to be reelected.

Dreyfus had a large fortune, and owned a townhouse at 98 avenue de Villiers in Paris as well as a chateau and farm property in Fontenay-lès-Briis, Essonne. He became general counsel of Seine-et-Oise for the canton of Rambouillet, and was secretary of the council of Rambouillet. He devoted himself to the question of public assistance, including Child Protection (1892), Tramps (1894) and Prisons (1895). He was also a historian, author of various historical works and studies, including Vauban économiste and La Rochefoucauld-Liancourt, both of which won awards. From 1907 to 1908 he taught a course at the Sorbonne on the protection of infants under the 3rd Republic. He was president of the Historical Society of the 1848 Revolution from 1908 to 1910.

== Senator ==
Dreyfus ran as a candidate for the Senate in a by-election on 17 February 1906, but was defeated. On 3 January 1909 Dreyfus was elected Senator for Seine-et-Oise in the first round. He joined the Republican Union. He engaged in discussions, often as reporter, on subjects such as worker's pensions, mutual insurance, aid to large families and juvenile courts. He was vice-president of the high council on prisons, and a member of the high councils on public education, agriculture, workers pensions and labor. On 11 November 1911 he presented the Legion of Honor to Sarah Monod, president of the National Council of French Women (Conseil national des femmes françaises). During World War I he was offered a ministerial portfolio but turned it down.

Ferdinand Dreyfus died in office on 15 July 1915 in Paris, at the age of sixty-six. He had two son, Jacques and Charles Ferdinand-Dreyfus.

== Bibliography ==
From 1886 to 1907, Dreyfus published numerous works:

- Vauban, economist (Leon Foucher prize, 1886)
- Studies and Speeches (1887)
- International Arbitration (1888)
- Social Missions and historical studies (Fabien prize, 1890)
- A former philanthropist: La Rochefoucauld-Liancourt (1901)
- The republican school and feminine patronage (1902)
- Assistance on the Legislative Assembly and the Convention (1905)
- Assistance on the Republic from 1848 to 1907 Municipal Public Library (1907)
