= André Siegfried =

French academic, geographer and political writer

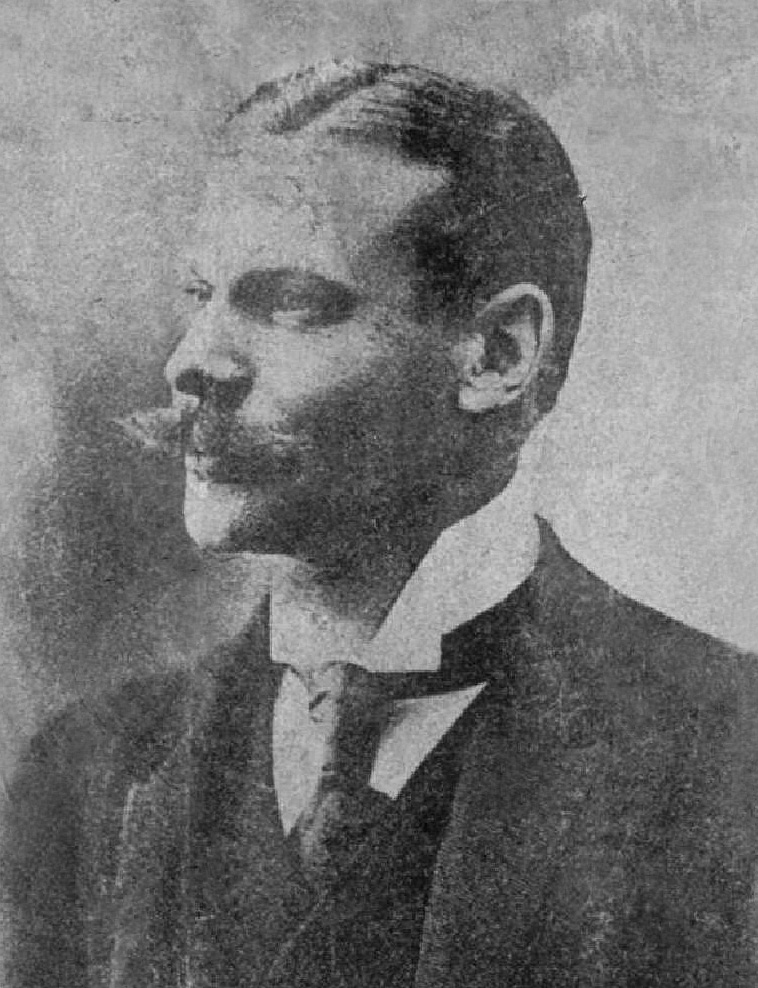
- André Siegfried (1910)
- Born: 21 April 1875; Le Havre
- Died: 28 March 1959 (aged 83); Paris
- Occupations: Academic; Geographer political writer

André Siegfried (April 21, 1875 – March 28, 1959) was a French academic, geographer and political writer best known to English speakers for his commentaries on American, Canadian, and British politics.

He was born in Le Havre, France, to Jules Siegfried, the French minister of commerce, and Julie Siegfried, the president of the National Council of French Women. An active member of the Democratic Republican Alliance like his father, André Siegfried was several times a candidate for the Chamber of Deputies, but never won an election. On 23 January 1941, he was made a member of the National Council of Vichy France. A few months after the liberation of France in mid-1944, he was elected to the Académie française, taking the vacant seat of Gabriel Hanotaux (who had been elected in 1897). He died in Paris in March 1959.

== Works ==
- Afrique du Sud; notes de voyage, Paris, A. Colin, 1949
- Albert Schweitzer études et témoignages, Éd. Robert Amadou, Bruxelles, Éditions de la Main jetée, 1951
- Amérique latine, Paris, A. Colin, 1934.
- Aspects de la société française, Paris, Pichon, 1954
- Aspects du XXe, Paris, Hachette 1955.
- Cinq propos sur la langue française, with Mario Roques, Paris, Fondation Singer-Polignac, 1955
- Cotonniers aux Indes, Paris, 1950
- Croisade. Conférences contradictoires, with Alfred Wautier d'Aygalliers, Charles Riandey, Union de libres-penseurs et de libres croyants pour la culture morale, Paris, Fischbacher, 1931
- De la IIIe à la IVe République, Paris, B. Grasset 1956
- De la IVe à la Ve République au jour le jour, Paris, B. Grasset, 1958
- Deux Mois en Amérique du Nord à la veille de la guerre (juin-juillet 1914), Paris, A. Colin, 1916.
- Discours de réception à l'Académie française. 16 janvier 1947, Éd. Maurice Garçon, Paris, A. Fayard, 1947
- Discours prononcés dans la séance publique tenue par L'Académie française pour la réception de M. Daniel-Rops, le jeudi 22 mars 1956, Paris, Typographie de Firmin-Didot, 1956
- Édouard Le Roy et son fauteuil, with Henri Daniel-Rops, Paris, A. Fayard 1956
- Edward Gibbon Wakefield et sa doctrine de la colonisation systématique, Paris, Armand Colin, 1904
- En Amérique du Sud : Articles parus dans le Petit Havre de juillet à décembre 1931, Le Havre, Le Petit Havre, 1932
- England's Crisis (London: Cape, 1931)
- Enquête politique, économique & sociale sur la Nouvelle-Zélande, Paris, Bureaux de la Revue politique et parlementaire, 1900
- États-Unis, Canada, Mexique : lettres de voyage écrites au Petit Havre, Le Havre, Le Journal, 1936
- Fourrure et pelletiers à travers les âges, with Jean H. Prat, Paris, Éd. du Tigre 1960
- France, Angleterre, États-Unis, Canada, Paris, Emile-Paul 1946
- Géographie économique. Cours de Université de Paris, Institut d'études politiques, année 1953-1954, Paris, Centre de documentation universitaire, 1954
- Géographie électorale de l'Ardèche sous la 3e République, Paris, Colin, 1949
- Géographie humoristique de Paris, Paris, La Passerelle, 1951
- Géographie poétique des cinq continents, Paris, La Passerelle, 1952
- Histoire politique de la IIIe République. Tome premier, L'avant guerre (1906–1914), with Georges Bonnefous, Paris, Presses universitaires de France, 1956, 1994
- Impressions de voyage en Amérique : 1914, Le Havre, Randolet, 1915
- Impressions du Brésil. Articles parus dans le Petit Havre du 5 au 19 septembre 1937, Le Havre, Impr. du journal le Petit Havre, 1937
- Itinéraires de contagions. Épidémies et idéologies, Paris, Armand Colin, 1960.
- La Civilisation occidentale, Oxford, Clarendon Press, 1945
- La Crise britannique au XXe siècle, Paris, A. Colin, 1931
- La Crise de l'Europe, Paris, Calmann-Lévy, 1935; pub. in trans. as Europe's Crisis (London: Jonathan Cape, 1935)
- La Démocratie en Nouvelle-Zélande, Paris, A. Colin, 1904
- La Dignité humaine, with Russel W. Davenport, Paris, Nouvelles éditions latines, 1958
- La Fontaine, Machiavel français, Paris, Ventadour, 1955
- La Langue française et les conditions de la vie moderne, with Josef Felixberger, Munich, Hueber 1968
- La Mer et l'empire. Série de vingt-deux conférences faites à l'Institut maritime et colonial, Paris, J. Renard 1944
- La Suisse, démocratie-témoin, with Pierre Béguin, Neuchâtel, La Baconnière, 1969
- La Technique et la culture dans une civilisation moderne, Paris, F.N. Syndicats d'ingénieurs et des cadres supérieurs, 1953
- La Zone sterling, with Jean de Sailly, Paris, A. Colin, 1957
- L'Alsace. Photographies originales, with Michel Nicolas, Paris, del Duca 1953
- L'Âme des peuples, Paris, Hachette 1950; translated by Edward Fitzgerald as The Character of Peoples (London: Jonathan Cape, 1952)
- L'Amérique ibérique, with Jacques de Lauwe, Paris, Gallimard, 1937
- L'Angleterre d'aujourd'hui : son évolution économique et politique, Paris, Grès, 1924.
- L'Angleterre moderne. Le problème social, l'expérience travailliste, with André Philip, Paris, Ed. G. Crès et Cie, 1925
- L'Année politique, 1946 : revue chronologiques des principaux faits politiques économiques et sociaux de la France du 1er janvier 1946 au 1er janvier 1947, Paris : Éditions du Grand Siècle, 1947
- L'Artisanat rural, ses problèmes actuels, with Lucien Gelly, Paris, Institut d'études corporatives et sociales, 1944
- Le Canada, les deux races; problèmes politiques contemporains, Paris, A. Colin, 1906; pub. in trans. as The Race Question in Canada (London: Eveleigh Nash, 1907)
- Le Canada, puissance internationale, Paris, A. Colin, 1937
- Le Capital américain et la conscience du roi. Le Néo-capitalisme aux États-Unis, with A. A. Berle, and Hélène Flamant, Paris, A. Colin, 1957
- Le Centenaire des services des Messageries Maritimes, (1851-1951), Éd. Jérôme et Jean Tharaud, Paris, Ettighoffer et Raynaud, 1952
- Le Développement économique de l'Amérique latine, Paris, SPID, 1947
- Le Grand changement de l'Amérique (1900-1950), with Frederick Lewis Allen and Roger Blondel, Paris, Amiot-Dumont, 1953
- Le Rôle moral et social d'Israël dans les démocraties contemporaines, Paris, Cahiers d'études juives, 1932
- Le XXe, âge de vitesse, Roma, Centro per lo sviluppo dei trasporti aerei, 1954
- L'Économie dirigée, with Chassain de Marcilly et al. Paris, F. Alcan, 1934
- Les États-Unis d'aujourd'hui : avec 8 cartes et figures, Paris, Librairie Armand Colin, 1927
- Les États-Unis et la civilisation américaine, Paris, Centre de documentation universitaire, 1947
- Les États-Unis tels que je les ai vus il y a cinquante ans et cette année, Conférence prononcée à l'Assemblée générale du G.I.R.E.P. le 25 avril 1956, Paris, 1957
- Les Forces religieuses et la vie politique. Le catholicisme et le protestantisme, with André Latreille, Paris, A. Colin, 1951
- Les Grandes Œuvres politiques de Machiavel à nos jours, with Jean-Jacques Chevallier, Paris, A. Colin, 1960
- Les Principaux Courants de la pensée religieuse en France : conférence prononcée à l'Hôtel Majestic, à Buenos-Aires le 17 septembre 1931, Éd. Buénos-Ayres : Comité Pro-Église Évangélique de Langue Française, 1931
- Les Problèmes ethniques de l'Afrique du Sud : conférence faite à la tribune de l'Université Coloniale de Belgique à Anvers le 21 février 1949, Anvers, Association des Anciens Étudiants de l'Université Coloniale de Belgique, 1949
- Les Questions actuelles de politique étrangère dans l'Amérique du Nord, Paris, F. Alcan, 1911.
- Les Voies d'Israël. Essai d'interprétation de la religion juive, Paris, Hachette 1958
- L'Esprit de l'histoire d'Angleterre, with A. L. Rowse, Paris, R. Julliard 1951
- L'Occident et la direction spirituelle du monde. (Allocution prononcée le vendredi 18 novembre 1932.), Neuilly, La Cause, 1932
- L'Œuvre scientifique d'André Siegfried, Paris, Presses de la Fondation nationale des sciences politiques, 1977
- Mes Souvenirs de la IIIe république. Mon père et son temps, Jules Siegfried, 1836-1922, Paris, Presses universitaires de France, 1946
- Mes Souvenirs d'enfance, Bourges, Tardy, 1957
- Mon Village sous la IVe République, Éd. Henri Baudet, Corrie Siohan-Psichari, Groningen, 1965
- Normandie, with Noël Le Boyer, Paris, Hachette 1957
- Nous sommes restés des Hommes, with Sidney Stewart, Québec, Le Club des livres à succès, 1950, 1961
- Pourquoi la Mission ? Éd. Marc André Boegner, Paris, Société des Missions Évangéliques, 1950
- Progrès technique et progrès moral, Éd. Nicolas Berdiaeff, Neuchâtel, La Baconnière, 1948
- Quelques Maximes, Paris, J. Haumont, 1946
- Quelques Règles à observer dans le travail, [S.l.s.n.], 1900-1977? 11
- Qu'est-ce que l'Amérique ?, Paris, Flammarion 1938.
- Savoir parler en public, Paris, Michel 1950.
- Suez, Panama et les routes maritimes mondiales, Paris, A. Colin, 1940
- Tableau des États-Unis, Paris, A. Colin, 1954.
- Tableau des partis en France, Paris, B. Grasset 1930
- Tableau politique de la France de l'Ouest sous la Troisième République. 102 cartes et croquis, 1 carte hors texte, Paris, A. Colin, 1913; réimp. Genève/Paris/Gex, Slatkine Reprints, 1980; réimp. Paris, Impr. nationale éditions, 1995; reimp, Bruxelles, Éditions de l'Université de Bruxelles, 2010.
- Vers un Ordre économique et social, Eugène Mathon 1860-1935 : sa vie, ses idées, ses œuvres, with Henry-Louis Dubly, Paris, [s.n.], 1946
- Vocation de Pont-à-Mousson, Nancy, 1957
- Voyage aux Indes, Paris, Colin, 1951.
- Vue générale de la Méditerranée, Paris, Gallimard 1943
