= French Union for Women's Suffrage =

French feminist organization

- Union française pour le suffrage des femmes
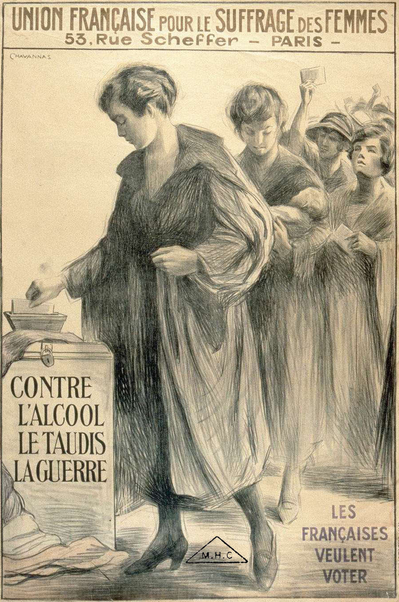
- 1909 poster: "French women want to vote - against alcohol, slums and war"
- Abbreviation: UFSF
- Formation: 1909
- Dissolved: 1945
- Purpose: Obtain the franchise for women
- Headquarters: Paris
- Region served: France
- Official language: French
- Key people: Cécile Brunschwicg
- Affiliations: International Woman Suffrage Alliance

The French Union for Women's Suffrage (UFSF: French: Union française pour le suffrage des femmes) was a French feminist organization formed in 1909 that fought for the right of women to vote, which was eventually granted in 1945. The Union took a moderate approach, advocating staged introduction of suffrage starting with local elections, and working with male allies in the Chamber of Deputies.

== Foundation ==
The UFSF was founded by a group of feminists who had attended a national congress of French feminists in Paris in 1908. Most of them were from bourgeois or intellectual backgrounds. The leaders were Jane Misme (1865–1935), editor of La Française, and Jeanne Schmahl (1846–1915). The UFSF provided a less militant and more widely acceptable alternative to the Suffrage des femmes organization of Hubertine Auclert (1848–1914). The sole objective, as published in La Française early in 1909, was to obtain women's suffrage through legal approaches. The founding meeting of 300 women was held in February 1909. Cécile Brunschvicg (1877–1946) was made secretary-general. She was the wife of the philosopher Léon Brunschvicg. Eliska Vincent accepted the position of honorary vice-president. The UFSF was formally recognized by the International Woman Suffrage Alliance (IWFA) congress in London in April 1909 as representing the French suffrage movement.

== Before World War I ==
The UFSF expanded quickly as Brunschwicg toured the provinces lecturing on feminism, and feminist school teachers organized local chapters. Sarah Monod, the dignified president of the National Council of French Women, became a member. Jeanne Mélin, a member of the French Section of the Workers' International, joined the UFSF. Louise Bodin, later to become prominent in the French Communist Party, was among the founders in March 1913 of a local UFSF group in Ille-et-Vilaine. By 1914 there were 12,000 members in 75 of the French departments. The UFSF strategy included collaboration with parliamentary representatives who supported women's suffrage such as Ferdinand Buisson, and a gradual process of enfranchisement that would start with votes in local elections.

Universal male suffrage had been granted in 1848. In February 1914 the extension of the 1848 act to women was introduced in the Chamber of Deputies, but did not pass. In April 1914 the UFSF was involved in the plebiscite organized by Marguerite de Witt-Schlumberger (1853–1924) with ballot boxes placed in newsstands and other public places. 505,972 ballots checked "I want to vote" and 114 were negative. The UFSF was generally against militant demonstrations, although it did participate in the 6,000-strong "Condorcet Demonstration". This was organized in Paris on 5 July 1914 by the journalist Séverine (Caroline Rémy), weeks before the outbreak of World War I.

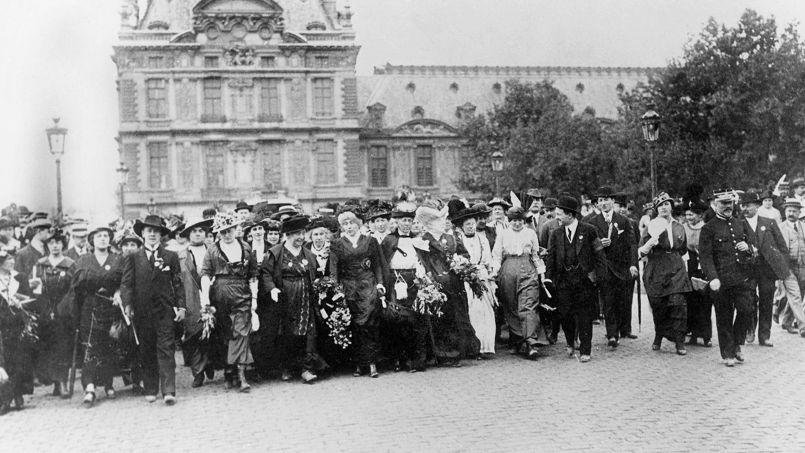
Women's suffrage demonstration in Paris on 5 July 1914

== Later years ==
The UFSF suspended the suffrage campaign during World War I (1914–18) and supported the government. After the war it was assumed that the government would give women the vote in recognition of their wartime contributions, and in fact the Chamber of Deputies passed a women's suffrage bill in 1919. However, the Senate blocked the bill, and continued to block the bill each time it was reintroduced. The chamber of deputies voted to give women the right to vote by 329 to 95 on 20 May 1919, but were blocked by the Senate. The deputies voted in favor of the women's franchise again on 7 April 1925 (389 to 140), on 12 July 1927 (396 to 94), on 21 March 1932 (446 to 60), on 1 March 1935 (453 to 124) and on 30 July 1936 (495 to 0). Each time the Senate blocked the motion.

In response to this Senate resistance the UFSF collaborated with the more militant Louise Weiss (1893–1983) for a short time but generally remained moderate and continued to work with allies among the deputies. Brunschwicg continued to lead the UFSF, which expanded after 1922 and by 1928 had 100,000 members. In 1936 Premier Léon Blum appointed Brunschwicg undersecretary for national education. Blum introduced a suffrage bill in 1936, again blocked by the Senate. During World War II (1939–45) the UFSF was inactive. General Charles de Gaulle granted women's suffrage in 1944, and Brunschwicg therefore chose not to revive the UFSF.

== Sources ==
- Hause, Steven C. (2002). "Union Française Pour Le Suffrage Des Femmes (UFSF)". In Helen Tierney (ed.). Women's Studies Encyclopedia. Greenwood Press.
- "La conquête de la citoyenneté politique des femmes" (in French). National assembly of France.
- Lestienne, Camille (2014-08-29). "Le Figaro défend le droit de vote des femmes (1917)". Le Figaro.
- Rappaport, Helen (2001). Encyclopedia of Women Social Reformers. ABC-CLIO. ISBN 978-1-57607-101-4.
- Sainte Croix, Avril de (January 1913). "Homage à Sarah Monod". La Femme. Papiers Sarah Monod, Bibliothèque de la Société de l'histoire du protestantisme français.
- Schiappa, Jean-Marc (1989). "COSNIER Colette, La bolchevique aux bijoux". Communisme - Révolution Française. L'AGE D'HOMME. ISBN 978-2-8251-3407-8.
- Tartakowsky, Danielle (2015). "Les françaises veulent voter". L’Histoire par l’image (in French).
- Vahe, Isabelle (2009). "Jeanne Mélin (1877–1964): une féministe radicale pendant la Grande Guerre". Femmes Face À la Guerre. Peter Lang. ISBN 978-3-03911-332-3.
