= Elisa Camiscioli =

American historian (born 1967)

Elisa Camiscioli is an American historian specialized in immigration to and from France, sex trafficking, and race and sexual politics in modern France and its empire. She is professor of history at Binghamton University. She authored Reproducing the French Race: Immigration, Intimacy, and Embodiment in the Early Twentieth Century. Duke University Press. 2009. ISBN 978-0-8223-4565-7. Selling French Sex: Prostitution, Trafficking, and Global Migrations was published by Cambridge University Press in 2024. ISBN 978-1-009-41840-9. Camiscioli was co-editor of the Journal of Women's History from 2015 to 2020.

Camiscioli completed a B.A., cum laude, at University of Pennsylvania in 1989. She took undergraduate courses in history at Paris Diderot University from 1987 to 1988. Camiscioli earned a M.A. (1991) and Ph.D. (2000) from the University of Chicago.
