= Léon Brunschvicg =

French philosopher (1869–1944)

- Born: 10 November 1869; Paris, France
- Died: 18 January 1944 (aged 74); Aix-les-Bains, France
- Spouse: Cécile Kahn

Education
- Education: École Normale Supérieure
- Thesis: La Modalité du jugement (1897)
- Doctoral advisor: Émile Boutroux

Philosophical work
- Era: 20th-century philosophy
- Region: Western philosophy
- School: French idealism Critical philosophy French historical epistemology
- Institutions: University of Paris
- Doctoral students: Gaston Bachelard; Jean Cavaillès; Vladimir Jankélévitch
- Notable students: Ferdinand Alquié; Simone de Beauvoir; Simone Weil; Vladimir Jankélévitch
- Main interests: Philosophy of mathematics

Léon Brunschvicg (French: [leɔ̃ bʁœ̃svik]; 10 November 1869 – 18 January 1944) was a French philosopher. He co-founded the Revue de métaphysique et de morale with Xavier Léon and Élie Halévy in 1893.

== Life ==
He was born into a Jewish family.

From 1895 to 1900 he taught at the Lycée Pierre Corneille in Rouen. In 1897 he completed his thesis under the title La Modalité du jugement (The Modalities of Judgement). In 1909 he became professor of philosophy at the Sorbonne. He was married to Cécile Kahn, a major campaigner for women's suffrage in France, with whom he had four children.

While at the Sorbonne, Brunschvicg was the supervisor for Simone de Beauvoir's master's thesis.

Forced to leave his position at the Sorbonne by the Nazis, Brunschvicg fled to the south of France, where he died at the age of 74. While in hiding, he wrote studies of Montaigne, Descartes, and Pascal that were printed in Switzerland. He composed a manual of philosophy dedicated to his teenage granddaughter entitled Héritage de Mots, Héritage d'Idées (Legacy of Words, Legacy of Ideas) which was published posthumously after the liberation of France. His reinterpretation of Descartes has become the foundation for a new idealism.

Brunschvicg defined philosophy as "the mind's methodical self-reflection" and gave a central role to judgement.

The publication of Brunschvicg's oeuvre has been recently completed after unpublished materials held in Russia were returned to his family in 2001. His daughter, the successful scientist Adrienne Weill, also contributed to the publication of his works.

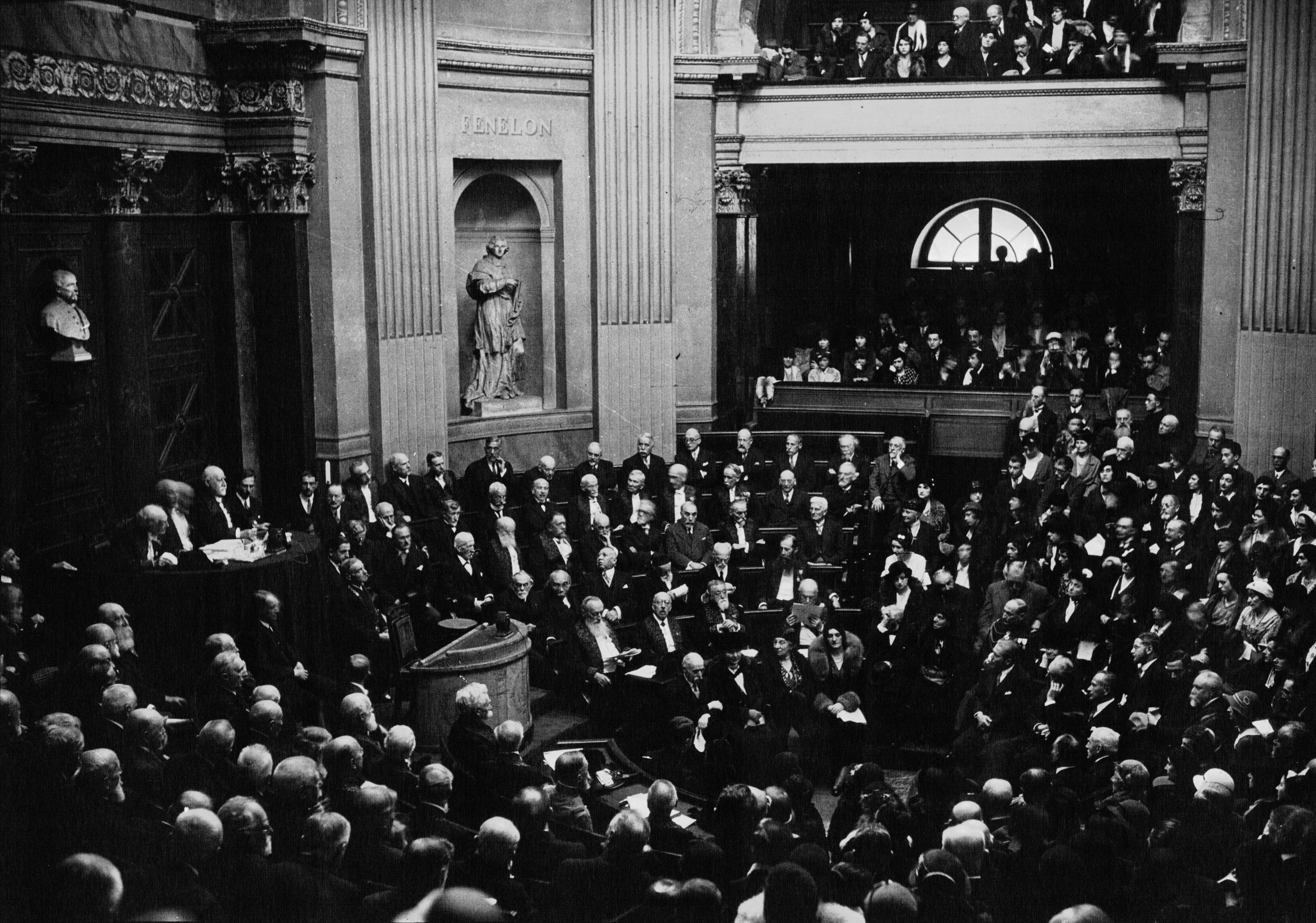
President Léon Brunschvicg (on the left) addressing the assembly on the occasion of the centenary of the re-establishment of the Académie des Sciences Morales et Politiques at the Institut de France in 1932.

== Works (selected) ==
- La Modalité du jugement, Paris, Alcan, 1897.
- Spinoza et ses contemporains, Paris, Alcan, 1923.
- L'idéalisme contemporain, Paris, Alcan, 1905.
- Les étapes de la philosophie mathématique, Paris, Alcan, 1912.
- L'expérience humaine et la causalité physique, Paris, Alcan, 1922.
- Le progrès de la conscience dans la philosophie occidentale, Paris, Alcan, 1927.
- La Physique au vingtième siècle, Paris, Hermann, 1939.
- La Raison et la religion, Paris, Alcan, 1939.
- Descartes et Pascal, lecteurs de Montaigne, Paris, La Baconnière, 1942.
- Héritage de mots, héritage d'idées, Paris, PUF, 1945.
- Agenda retrouvé, 1892–1942, Paris, Minuit, 1948.
- La philosophie de l'esprit seize lecons professées en Sorbonne 1921-1922, Paris, PUF, 1949.
- De la vraie et de la fausse conversion, Paris, PUF, 1950.
- Écrits philosophiques I: L'Humanisme de l'occident, Descartes, Spinoza, Kant, Paris: PUF, 1951.
- Écrits philosophiques II: L'Orientation du rationalisme, Paris: PUF, 1954.
- Écrits philosophiques III: Science – Religion, Paris: PUF, 1958.

English translations

- Lafrance, Jean-David: "Physics and Metaphysics" and "On the Relations of Intellectual Consciousness and Moral Consciousness" in The Philosophical Forum, 2006, Volume 37, Issue 1, pages 53–74.
