= Julie Siegfried =

French feminist

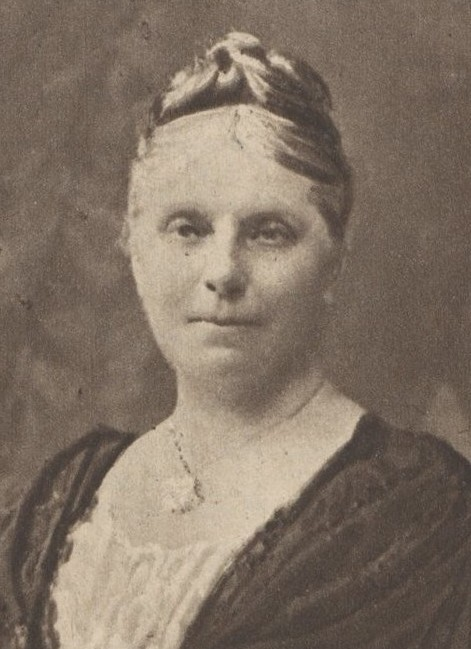
- Siegfried in a 1918 publication
- Born: Louise Henriette Julie Puaux; 13 February 1848; Luneray, Seine-Inférieure, France
- Died: 28 May 1922 (aged 74); Paris, France
- Occupation: Feminist activist
- Spouse: Jules Siegfried (1837-1922)
- Children: Jules Siegfried (1870-1943); André Robert Siegfried (1875-1959); Robert Siegfried (1883-1923)
- Parent(s): François Puaux (1806-1895); Mathilde Léorat (1816-1883)

Julie Siegfried (born Julie Puaux: 13 February 1848 – 28 May 1922) was a French feminist. She served as president of the Conseil National des femmes françaises (CNFF/ literally, "National Council of French Women") between 1913 and 1922.

== Early life and family ==
Julie Puaux was born on 13 February 1848 in Luneray, a small town couple of miles inland from Dieppe in Normandy, France. Luneray is one of the few places in this part of France to have a significant Protestant population. The Puaux family was Protestant, moderately prosperous and, at a time when the political and social reverberations of the French Revolution were still very much alive, anti-monarchist and passionately anti-catholic. François Puaux (1806-1895), Julie's father, was the minister at the (Protestant) Reformed Church in the town

Julie's siblings included Frank Puaux (1844-1922), himself a Protestant minister-theologian and a noted historian of Protestantism in France. On 2 February 1869 Julie Puaux married Jules Siegfried (1837-1922) at Alès (Gard). He was a successful businessman and politician originally from Alsace. The couple's son, André Siegfried (1875-1959), would later become known to English speakers for his commentaries on American, Canadian, and British politics.

== Career ==
Siegfried was a feminist. Initially the focus of her energies was on education provision for girls in Le Havre, the major port city of which her husband served as the mayor (1870-1873 and 1878-1886). There was an apprenticeship college and, in 1880, a primary school. Then, in 1885, she was involved in setting up one of the first girls' secondary schools (lycées de fille). Soon after her husband was elected to the Chambre des députés (parliament) in 1885 the couple moved to Paris, setting up home initially in a centrally positioned apartment at 6 rond-point des Champs-Elyses and moving after ten years, to what became the family home at 226 boulevard Saint-Germain in the city's fashionable Left Bank district.

Julie Siegfried now engaged actively in various feminist organisations and actions. She took part in the conferences at Versailles that were arranged by Sarah Monod and was involved with the journal, "La Femme". She worked with the Union française pour le suffrage des femmes(UFSF / "French Union for Women's Suffrage") and, most prominently, with the Conseil National des femmes françaises (CNFF/ literally, "National Council of French Women") of which she served as president between January 1913 and her death in 1922, in succession to Sarah Monod, the CNFF's first president. She became vice-president of the International Council of Women, of which the CNFF is the French branch. She also presided over the "League for Moral Education".

But her most important role involved her CNFF work. The CNFF was the largest feminist organisation in France, with 21,000 members in 1900 and almost 100,000 in 1914. Its objectives included the provision of support, hygiene improvements, women's education and work for women. But its strongest advocacy concerned votes for women. In this campaign Julie Siegfried was strongly backed by her husband.

Jules Siegfried and her parliamentary colleagues managed to have the necessary motion tabled and positively received in the National Assembly (lower house of parliament) in 1909, but there was no vote: at this stage, and for many more years even after the necessary legislation had been passed by the lower house in 1919, women's suffrage was blocked by the Senate (upper house).

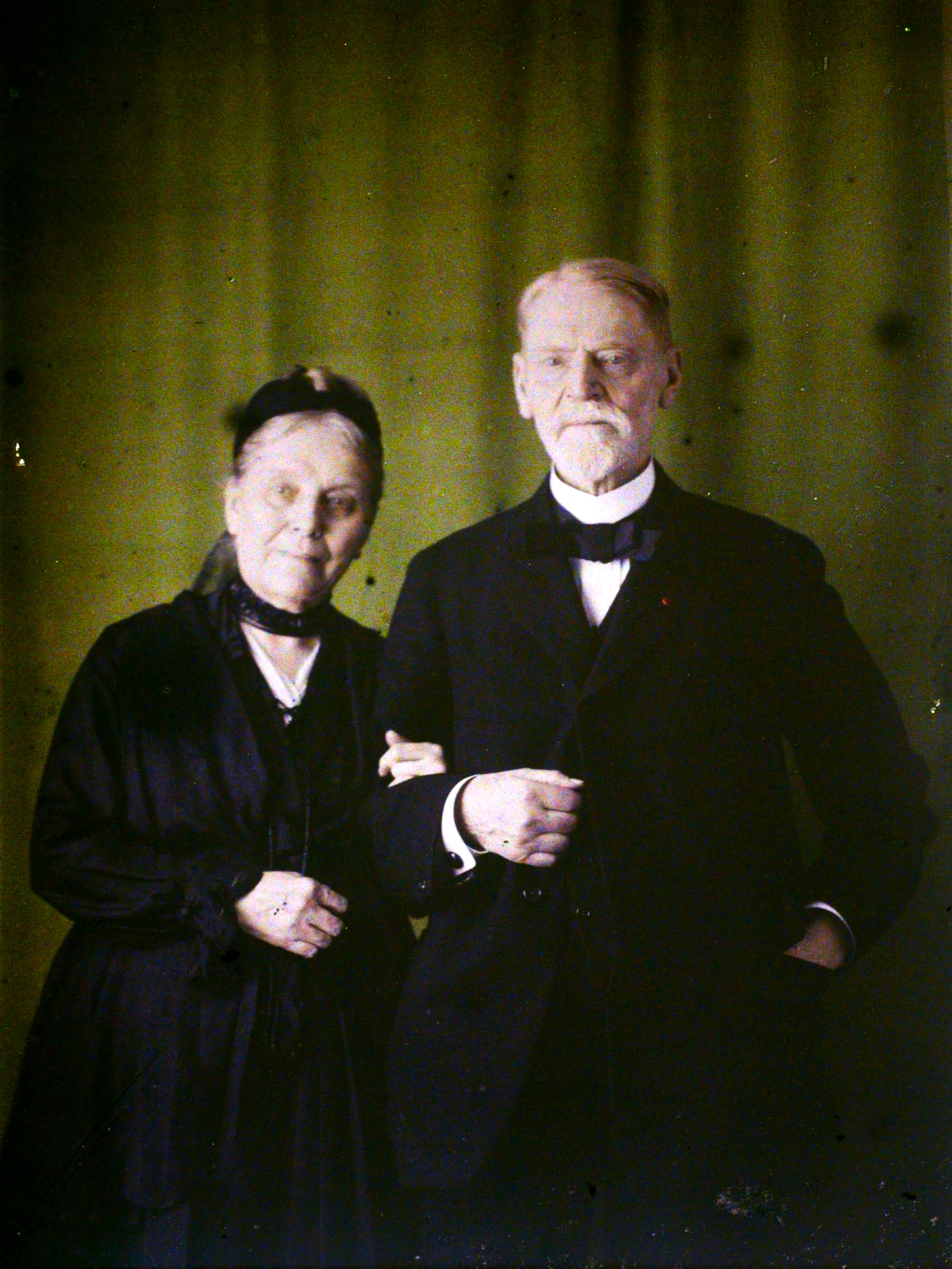
Autochrome of Julie Siegfried with her husband, 1921

== Celebration ==
In 1919 Julie Siegried was made a knight of the legion of honour in recognition, formally, of her work as president or founder of welfare support organisations and for war [welfare] work ("présidente ou fondatrice d’œuvres d'assistance ou d’œuvres de guerre").

== Death ==
Julie Siegfried died on May 28, 1922, predeceasing her husband by less than four months.
