= Maria Pognon =

French women's rights activist and freemason

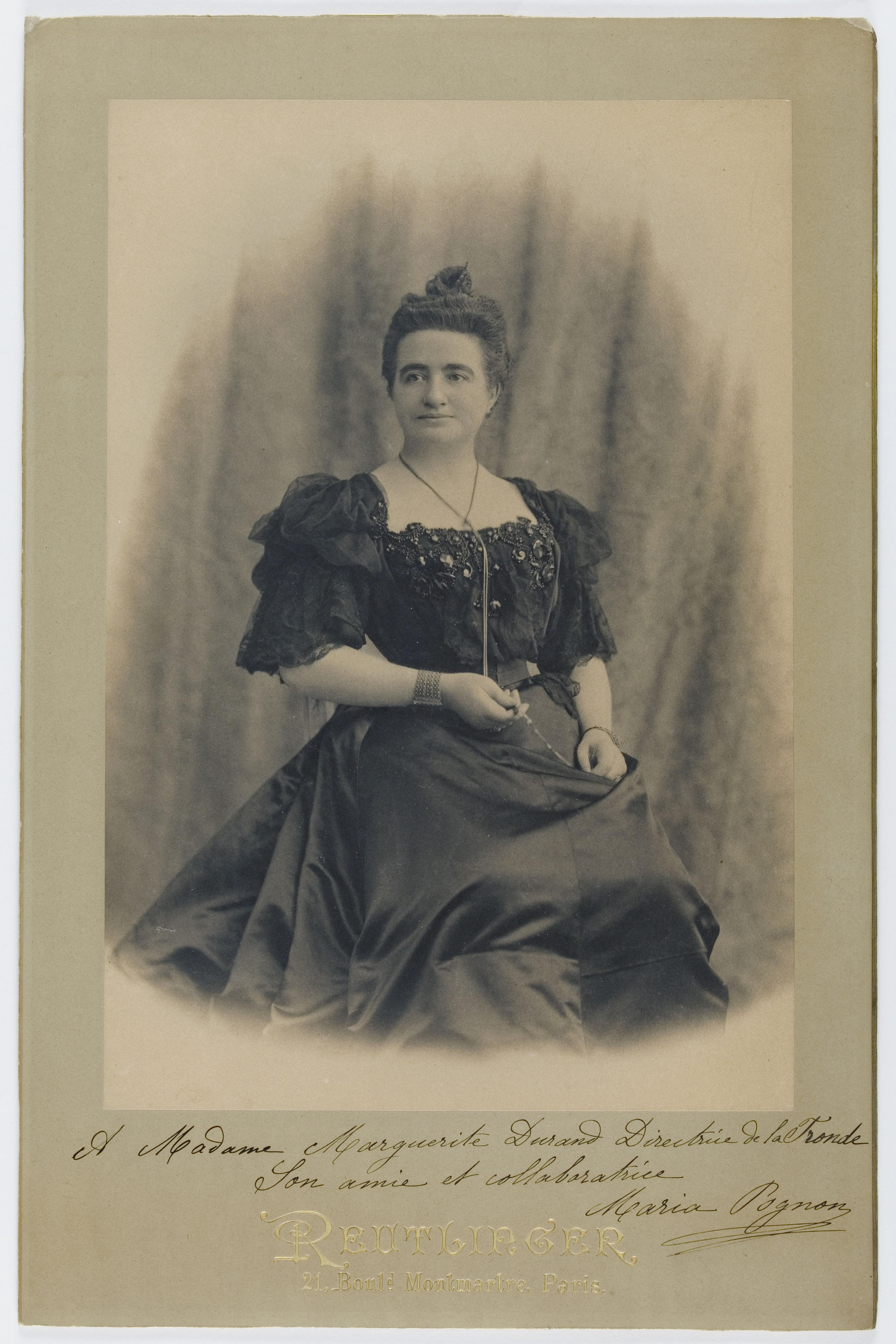
- Born: Maria Rengnet; 15 February 1844; Honfleur, France
- Died: 17 April 1925 (aged 81); Sydney, Australia
- Occupations: Writer, Suffragist
- Spouse: Raymond Pognon (m. 1873; died in 1876)

Maria Pognon née Rengnet (15 February 1844 – 17 April 1925) was a French journalist, editor, feminist, suffragist, pacifist and freemason, who is remembered for her success as a women's rights activist in the late 19th century. From 1892 to 1903, she was president of the Ligue Française pour le Droit des Femmes, and was also a member of the pacifist association Société française pour l'arbitrage entre nations. As a freemason, she was one of the 17 founders of the Loge du Droit humain (Human Rights Lodge), which was open to both men and women.

== Early and personal life ==
Born in Honfleur on 15 February 1844, Maria Rengnet was the daughter of Julien Rengnet, a slate mason. Brought up in a well-to-do family, in 1873 she married the architect Raymond Pognon, with whom she had a son and a daughter. Her husband died of typhoid in 1876. In 1880, she moved to Paris where she ran a high-class boarding house.

== Work ==
In 1889, after attending the women's rights congress Congrès français et international du droit des femmes, she became an avid member of the women's movement. From 1892, she was a leading figure in the French League for Women's Rights (Ligue Française pour le Droit des Femmes), becoming president two years later and remaining in the post until 1903. She proved to be an effective leader and public speaker, organizing and presiding the International Feminist Congress (Congrès Feministe International) in Paris in both 1882 and 1896 and, together with Marguerite Durand, the 1900 International Congress on the Status and Rights of Women (Congrès international de la condition et des droits des femmes), also held in Paris. In 1901, she was one of six women who established the National Council of French Women (Conseil National des Femmes Françaises).

Pognon was also a keen writer, contributing some 70 articles to the women's journal La Fronde between 1897 and 1900. In 1893, she was one of the 17 women who founded the Droit Humain masonic lodge which was open to both men and women members.

In 1905, suddenly becoming short of money, she and her daughter Mathilde joined her son in New Caledonia. Two years later, together with her daughter, she moved to Sydney, Australia, where she became active in the local women's organizations. She died in the Sydney suburb Double Bay on 17 April 1925.

== See also ==
- List of peace activists
