= Cécile Brunschvicg =

French politician

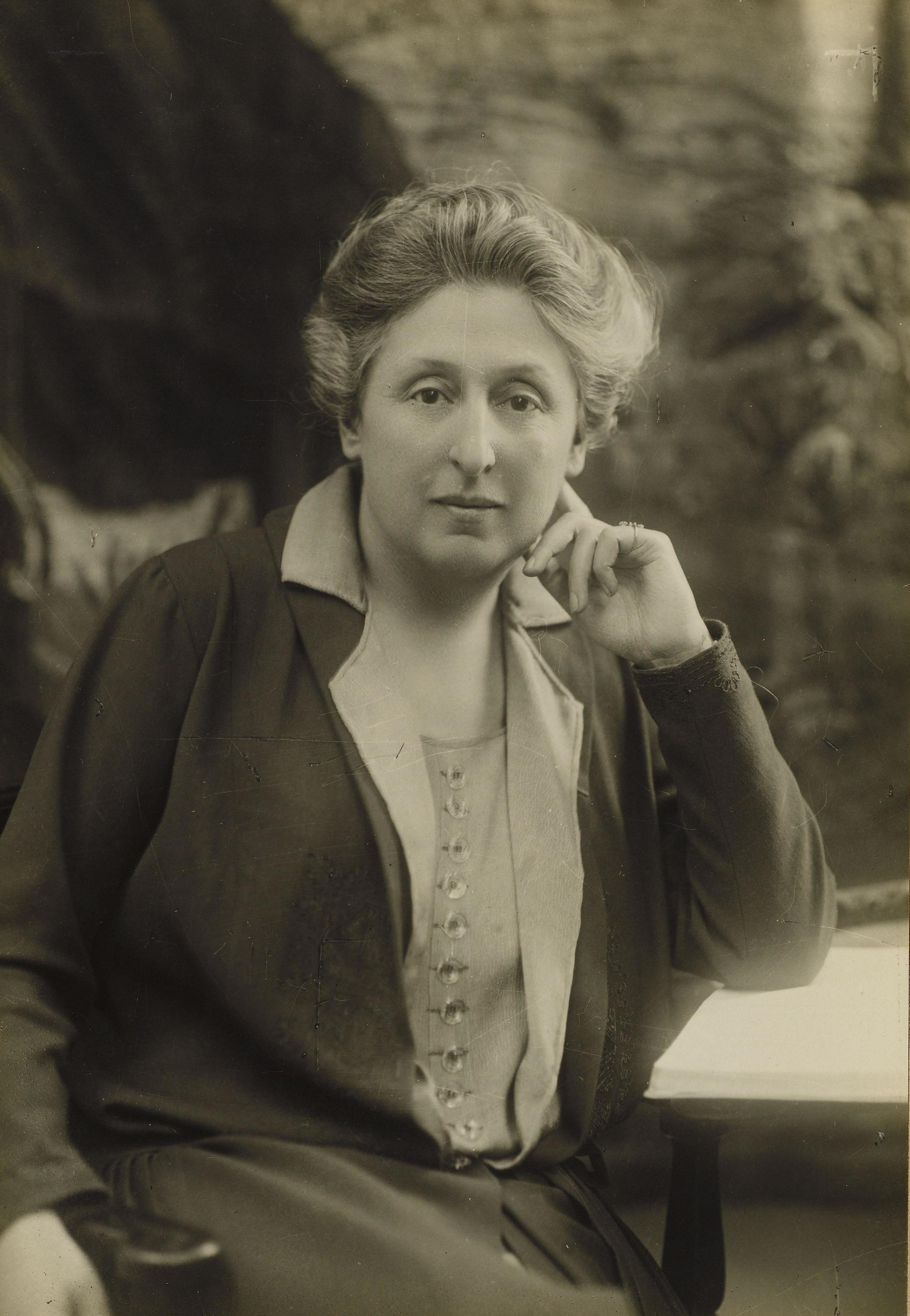
- Brunschvicg c. 1926

Undersecretary of State for national education of France
- In office 5 June 1936 – 21 June 1937
- President: Albert Lebrun
- Prime Minister: Léon Blum
- Preceded by: Henri Guernut indirectly
- Succeeded by: Léo Lagrange

Personal details
- Born: Cécile Kahn; 19 July 1877 Enghien-les-Bains, France
- Died: 5 October 1946 (aged 69) Neuilly-sur-Seine, France
- Party: PRS
- Spouse: Léon Brunschvicg

Cécile Brunschvicg (French: [sesil bʁœ̃svik]), née Kahn, 19 July 1877 – 5 October 1946), was a French feminist politician. From the 1920s until her death she was regarded as "the grande dame of the feminist movement" in France.

== Biography ==
She was born into a Jewish middle-class, republican family. Her familial environment was not inclined to let women study, especially not when they were over 17. Already a "liberated" woman (for the time), it was her meeting, and subsequent marriage to, Léon Brunschvicg, a feminist philosopher and member of the Ligue des droits de l'homme, that spurred her to feminist activism; she became vice-president of the League of Electors for women's suffrage.

The French Union for Women's Suffrage (UFSF: Union française pour le suffrage des femmes) was founded by a group of feminists who had attended a national congress of French feminists in Paris in 1908, led by Jeanne Schmahl and Jane Misme. The UFSF provided a less militant and more widely acceptable alternative to the Suffrage des femmes of Hubertine Auclert (1848–1914). The sole objective was to obtain women's suffrage through legal approaches. The founding meeting of 300 women was held in February 1909. Cécile Brunschvicg was made secretary-general. Schmahl was the first president. Eliska Vincent accepted the position of honorary vice-president. The UFSF was formally recognized by the International Woman Suffrage Alliance (IWFA) congress in London in April 1909 as representing the French suffrage movement. In 1926, she became the editor of La Française.

Cécile Brunschvicg was named Undersecretary of State for national education in the first Léon Blum government.

Her daughter, Adrienne Weill, a student of Marie Curie, became a successful scientist.

== Sources ==
- Hause, Steven C. (2002). "Union Française Pour Le Suffrage Des Femmes (UFSF)". In Helen Tierney (ed.). Women's Studies Encyclopedia. Greenwood Press.
- Newhall, David S. (1999). "Brunschvicg, Cécile". Women in World History. Vol. 3: Brem-Cold. Waterford, CT: Yorkin Publications. ISBN 0-7876-4062-X.
- Rappaport, Helen (2001). Encyclopedia of Women Social Reformers. ABC-CLIO. ISBN 978-1-57607-101-4.
- "The Woman Movement In France and Its Leader". The Brooklyn Daily Eagle. New York. 4 September 1911 – via newspapers.com.
- (in French) Biography at the University of Angers Archived 3 January 2014 at the Wayback Machine
