= Jules Siegfried =

French politician

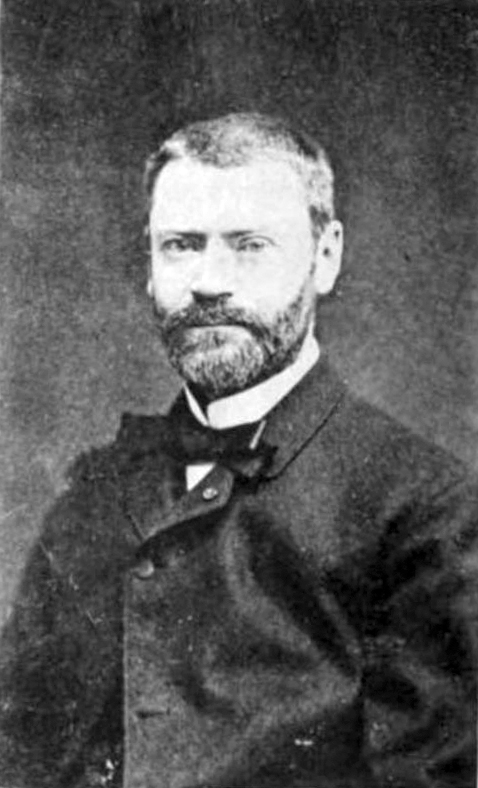
- Born: 12 February 1837; Mulhouse, Haut-Rhin, France
- Died: 26 September 1922 (aged 85); Le Havre, Seine-Maritime, France
- Occupation: Politician
- Spouse: Julie Siegfried (1848-1922)
- Children: Jules Siegfried (1870-1943); André Robert Siegfried (1875-1959); Robert Siegfried (1883-1923)

Jules Siegfried (12 February 1837 – 26 September 1922) was a French politician. He served as a member of the Chamber of Deputies from 1885 to 1897, and from 1902 to 1922.

Siegfried was active in the social Protestant movement, as were other Musée social members such as Charles Gide (1847–1932), Édouard Gruner (1849–1933), Henri Monod (1843–1911) and Pierre-Paul Guieysse (1841–1914).

He died in Le Havre on 26 September 1922.

== Sources ==
- Horne, Janet R. (11 January 2002), A Social Laboratory for Modern France: The Musée Social and the Rise of the Welfare State, Duke University Press, ISBN 0-8223-2792-9
