= Le Droit des femmes =

French academic journal (1869–1891)

- Discipline: Feminism
- Language: French
- Edited by: Léon Richer

Publication details
- History: 1869–1891; No 408, 20 Dec. 1891
- Frequency: Weekly

Standard abbreviations
- ISO 4: Droit Femmes

Indexing
- ISSN: 1248-3796
- LCCN: sf94091994

Le Droit des femmes (Women's Rights) was a French feminist journal that appeared from 1869 to 1891. It was founded and edited by Léon Richer, and in the early days supported financially by Maria Deraismes. The newspaper supported many women's causes, but always avoided directly supporting women's suffrage. It was one of the longest running journals of its type in the 19th century.

== History ==
The first issue of Le Droit des femmes appeared on 10 April 1869. Léon Richer was the editor-in-chief. (Note: The newspaper was associated with various feminist groups formed around the same time. The Société pour la revendication des droits de la femme (Society for Claiming Women's Rights) first met in 1866 at the house of André Léo. It had diverse membership who agreed on the need to improve the condition of women of all social conditions and classes. In 1870, the Association pour le droit des femmes (Association for Women's Rights) was founded by Léon Richer, Marie Deraismes and her sister, Anna Féresse-Deraismes, Louise Michel, Paule Mink, André Léo and Jules Simon and his wife. The association was linked to the newspaper. Maria Deraismes created the Société pour l'Amelioration du Sort de la Femme (Society for the Amelioration of Women's Condition) in 1870.) Richer edited the paper and wrote most of the content. He was a free-thinker and feminist who worked closely with Maria Deraismes. Desraismes helped fund the paper, to which she also contributed. Julie-Victoire Daubié wrote several economic and feminist pieces for the journal. Le Droit des Femmes was suspended on 11 August 1870 during the Franco-Prussian War (1870–71). The newspaper reappeared as the Avenir des femmes (Women's future) on 24 September 1871. This was a somewhat less assertive name.

In the mid-1870s Eugénie Potonié-Pierre became secretary of Le Droit des femmes and a regular contributor to the journal. Desraismes and Richer organized a Women's Rights conference in July–August 1878. After this conference, Richer reverted to the original title of Le Droit des Femmes. The first issue of the new Droit des femmes appeared on 5 January 1879. In December 1891 Le Droit des Femmes ceased publication and Richer retired from the feminist movement. Le Droit des Femmes had been one of the longest-running feminist journals of the 19th century. It was mentioned as one of the eight main journals of the century in Alison Finch's "Women's Writing in Nineteenth-Century France".

== Content ==
Published in Paris, Le Droit des femmes covered policy reviews, as well as literary, social, and economic news. The purpose of the weekly newspaper was to campaign for reform of women's legal rights. Demands included establishment of a family council that would help women whose husbands or fathers were abusive, better education for girls, higher wages for women to reduce the need for prostitution, equal wages for equal work, admission of qualified women to the professions, women's control of property and wealth and revisions to the Civil Code. The paper did not demand women's suffrage, which Richer always claimed to support but always in practice found reasons to oppose.

== Sources ==
- Bidelman, Patrick Kay (Summer 1976). "The Politics of French Feminism: Léon Richer and the Ligue Française pour le Droit des Femmes, 1882-1891". Historical Reflections / Réflexions Historiques. 3 (1). Berghahn Books: 93–120. JSTOR 41298677.
- Commire, Anne, ed. (1999). "Potonié-Pierre, Eugénie (1844–1898)". Women in World History: A Biographical Encyclopedia. Waterford, CT: Yorkin Publications, Gale Group. ISBN 0787640808.
- Dixon-Fyle, Joyce Elizbeth (2006). Female Writers' Struggle for Rights and Education for Women in France (1848-1871). Peter Lang. ISBN 978-0-8204-5531-0.
- Finch, Alison (10 August 2000). Women's Writing in Nineteenth-Century France. Cambridge University Press. p. 247. ISBN 978-0-521-63186-0.
- Gildea, Robert (2008). Children of the Revolution: The French, 1799-1914. Harvard University Press. ISBN 978-0-674-03209-5.
- Girollet, Anne (2000). Victor Schoelcher, abolitionniste et républicain: approche juridique et politique de l'oeuvre d'un fondateur de la République (in French). KARTHALA Editions. ISBN 978-2-84586-004-9.
- McMillan, James F. (8 January 2002). France and Women, 1789-1914: Gender, Society and Politics. Routledge. p. 130. ISBN 978-1-134-58957-9.
- Moses, Claire Goldberg (1984). French Feminism in the 19th Century. SUNY Press. ISBN 978-0-87395-859-2.
