= Anna Féresse-Deraismes =

French feminist activist (1821–1910)

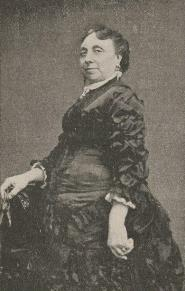
- Born: 1 October 1821; Paris, France
- Died: 19 January 1910 (aged 88); Paris
- Occupation: feminist activist
- Relatives: Maria Deraismes (sister)

Anna Féresse-Deraismes (1 October 1821 – 19 January 1910) was a French feminist activist for women's rights and a Freemason. She was appointed honorary president of the International Congress of Women in 1896 and 1900, and was a founding member of the first mixed-gender Masonic Order, Le Droit Humain. Maria Deraismes was her sister.

== Biography ==
Anna Féresse-Deraismes was born in Paris, October 1, 1821. She came from a liberal bourgeois family. Her father was an anticlerical Voltairean. Isabelle Bogelot, then an orphan, was taken in by the Deraismes family in 1842. Féresse-Deraismes took charge of the education of her younger sister, Maria, when their father died in 1852.

Féresse-Deraismes played a discreet role in the wake of her younger sister as she became better recognized. Both sisters inherited the fortune of their parents, and Anna Féresse went to live with her sister, who never married, when she became a widow. They both shared the same ideas and had the same access to education in their younger years. Following Maria's death in 1894, Féresse-Deraismes gathered her sister's work in Oeuvres complètes de Maria Deraismes which appeared in 1895 and 1896.

At the International Congress of Women, Paris, 9 April 1896, Féresse-Deraismes was appointed honorary president and thus came into contact with Maria Pognon, Marie Martin, Marie Popelin, Marya Chéliga-Loevy, Louise Koppe, and Eugénie Potonié-Pierre.

Féresse-Deraismes continued her sister's feminist struggle as a member of the "Société pour l'amélioration du sort de la femme et la revendication de ses droits" (Society for the Improvement of Conditions for Women and the Vindication of Their Rights) and served as Honorary President of the International Congress of Women in 1900.

Féresse-Deraismes was a founding member of the first mixed-gender Masonic Order, Le Droit Humain. In 1904, she became a member of the "Association Nationale des Libres Penseurs de France" (National Association of Free Thinkers of France).

In December 1898, Féresse-Deraismes gave a funeral oration for Virginie Griess-Traut, whom she knew well. Féresse-Deraismes was invited to various other gatherings, including that for the new statue of Charles Fourier on Boulevard de Clichy in June 1899 or for the publication of Émile Zola's novel Travail (Labor).

She died 19 January 1910, in the 17th arrondissement of Paris.

== Selected works ==
- Oeuvres complètes de Maria Deraismes (compiled)
- Allocution de Mme Féresse-Deraismes, Présidente d'honneur du Congrès, Présidente de la Sociéte pour l'amélioration du sort de la femme et la revendication de ses droits., 1900
