= Camusat =

Camusat (English: /kæmuːˈzɑː/, French: [kamyza]) is a French surname. Notable people with the surname include:

- Denis-François Camusat (1697–1732), French historian, grand nephew of Nicholas Camusat
- Nicholas Camusat (1575–1655), French historian
- Léonie Rouzade, born Louise-Léonie Camusat, French politician, journalist and author
