= Marie Bonnevial =

French teacher and women's rights activist

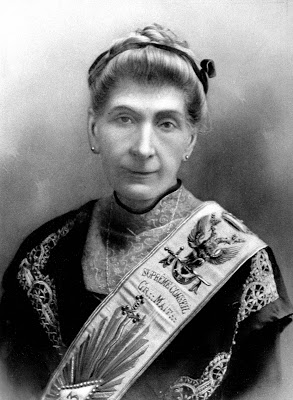
- Marie Bonnevial as Grand Mistress of the Supreme Council of Le Droit Humain
- Born: 28 June 1841; Rive-de-Gier
- Died: 4 December 1918 (aged 77)
- Occupation: Teacher

Marie Bonnevial (28 June 1841 - 4 December 1918) was a French teacher and women's rights activist. She became Grand Mistress of the Supreme Council of Le Droit Humain.

== Early years ==
Marie Bonnevial was born on 28 June 1841 in Rive-de-Gier, Loire, to a poor family. She was able to go to school, and under the Second French Empire (1852-1870) she was a secular school teacher in Lyon. During the Franco-Prussian War (1870–71) she served as a volunteer nurse.

In 1871 Marie Bonnevial joined the movement of the Paris Commune. She agitated for the creation of a teachers' union. The government deprived her of her job because of her support for the Communards and for those who were convicted after the suppression of the commune began on 28 May 1871. She left the country and joined her aunt in Turkey, where she taught French to the children of the commercial bourgeoisie. Victor Hugo wrote her a supportive letter on 17 September 1872 urging her to keep fighting and saying all honorable people admired her. In 1877 she returned to France, and created a vocational school in the 18th arrondissement of Paris.

== Feminist ==
Marie Bonnevial became involved with various groups interested in spiritualism and literature. She was also a feminist, syndicalist and socialist. She became active in the Ligue des droits des femmes (League of Women's Rights), where she met Maria Deraismes and Clémence Royer. The secretary of the Fédération Française des Sociétés Féministes, Aline Valette, founded the weekly tabloid L'Harmonie sociale which first appeared on 15 October 1892. The masthead had the message: "The emancipation of women is in emancipated labor". Some of the contributors to the journal included Eliska Vincent, Marie Bonnevial and Marya Chéliga-Loevy.

On 3 November 1894 Bonnevial was initiated into Lodge #1 of the International Order of Freemasonry Le Droit Humain. In 1895 she created Lodge #2 in Lyon, and in 1904 she created Lodge #4, now known as the Bonnevial Lodge. Marie Bonnevial was in contact with many other masons, including Gabriel Persigoud in Bordeaux, with whom she campaigned for creation of a teachers' union. In 1893 she was elected delegate to the national secretariat of the Fédération des Bourses du Travail (Federation of Workers' Councils). In 1900 she was the first woman appointed to the Higher Labor Council of France.

Speaking at the Congress of Women's Rights in 1900 Marie Bonnevial said that women were victims of a false education that made them hold as a virtue the principle of resignation, which was opposed to all progress. She was among the women such as Marie Guillot, Maria Vérone, Séverine and Aline Valette who campaigned for women's right to vote, for reform of the civil code (which treated a woman as a minor) and for access by women to all topics of study and all professions. She contributed to the feminist daily La Fronde, and by the start of the 20th century was a well-known feminist. She was deeply involved in the Conseil national des femmes françaises (CNFF - National Council of French Women) and the Ligue française pour le droit des femmes (LFDF - French league for women's rights). In 1913 she was president of the Standing Committee of the Supreme Council of Le Droit Humain.

== War and death ==
Marie Bonnevial became a volunteer nurse again during World War I (1914-1918). When Marie-Georges Martin died she succeeded her as the Grand Mistress. She was head of Le Droit Humain from 1916 to 1918. She was hit by a military ambulance on 4 December 1918 and died in the hospital at the age of 77.

A Lyon journalist said of her in 1902: "For her candor and the uprightness of her attacks, often violent but never bitter, she honors our profession and holds an honorable place."

== Sources ==
- Bouchoux, Corinne (2013). "La citoyenne Marie Bonnevial (1841-1918)" (PDF). MUSEA. Université d'Angers.
- "Fonds Marie Bonnevial". BUA.
- Liszek, Slava (1994-01-01). Marie Guillot: de l'émancipation des femmes à celle du syndicalisme. Editions L'Harmattan. ISBN 978-2-7384-2947-6.
- Louis, Marie-Victoire (1994). Le droit de cuissage: France, 1860-1930. Editions de l'Atelier. ISBN 978-2-7082-3062-0.
- "Marie Bonnevial". Fédération Française du Droit Humain. Archived from the original on 2013-09-26.
- "Marie Bonnevial" (in Spanish). Logia Constancia. Masonería mixta en Aragón del REAA OMMI Le Droit Humain. 7 January 2013.
- Sowerwine, Charles (January 1982). Sisters Or Citizens?: Women and Socialism in France Since 1876. Cambridge University Press. ISBN 978-0-521-23484-9.
