= Eliska Vincent =

French feminist, editor

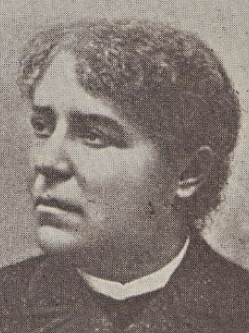
- c. 1904
- Born: Eliska Girard; 1841; Mézières, Eure-et-Loir, France
- Died: 1914 (aged 72–73)
- Occupation: Feminist
- Known for: Lost archives of feminism

Eliska Vincent (née Eliska Girard 1841–1914) was a Utopian socialist and militant feminist in France. She argued that women had lost civil rights that existed in the Middle Ages, and these should be restored. In the late 1880s and 1890s she was one of the most influential of the Parisian feminists. She created extensive archives on the feminist movement of the 19th and early 20th centuries, but these have been lost.

== Early years ==
Eliska Girard was born in Mézières, Eure-et-Loir, in 1841. Her father was an artisan. He was imprisoned for his participation as a Republican in the French Revolution of 1848. She joined the Société pour la Revendication du Droit des Femmes (Society for claiming women's rights), which first met in 1866 at André Léo's house. Other members were Maria Deraismes, Paule Mink, Louise Michel, Élie Reclus and Caroline de Barrau. The members had a range of views, but agreed to work on the common goal of improving education of girls. Vincent was also a Utopian socialist. She supported the Paris Commune in 1871, and was almost executed for her role. In 1878 Eliska Vincent was a delegate to a worker's congress.

== Feminist leader ==
In 1888 Eliska Vincent formed the feminist group Egalité de Asnières, named after the suburb in which she lived. The small but influential group never had more than one hundred members. She also founded the journal L'Egalité that year. Hubertine Auclert, the overall feminist leader in Paris, left for Algeria in 1888. Vincent took the lead in Paris with her group. With a moderate and relatively uncontroversial program, she gained support for the movement from middle-class women. In the first women's rights congress, held in 1889, as representative for Egalité she made the proposal that women should participate in local charity boards, which won general support.

In January 1892 Eugénie Potonié-Pierre brought together eight feminist groups in Paris into the Fédération Française des Sociétés Féministes (French Federation of Feminist Societies). The Federation's secretary Aline Valette founded the weekly tabloid L'Harmonie sociale which first appeared on 15 October 1892 as a means of making contact with working women to understand their concerns. The masthead had the socialist message: "The emancipation of women is in emancipated labor". However, the contributors to the journal, who included Eliska Vincent, Marie Bonnevial and Marya Chéliga-Loevy, were more interested in feminism than socialism.

Eliska Vincent wanted to restore women's rights that she felt had existed during the Middle Ages. She was among the advocates of women's suffrage who pointed out that in earlier days, when the right to vote was tied to ownership of landed property, it had been common for women to vote. On 4 April 1893 Vincent was among a group of women who formed a lodge in the Masonic tradition headed by Maria Deraismes as Grand Master, Le Droit Humain (Human Right). The other founders included Maria Martin and Clémence Royer. On 5 September 1895 Marie Bonnevial founded the second lodge in Lyon, and other lodges were soon founded in other locations in France.

== Later years ==
Eliska Vincent resigned from Egalité in 1900 when it allied itself with the larger National Council of French Women. When she was widowed she inherited land in Saint-Ouen, Seine-Saint-Denis in Paris, giving her a secure income with which she helped promote women's rights and the rights of workers. She was an active member of the French Syndicalists, a trade union group that believed the working classes should be active in forcing social change. In 1909 Vincent accepted the position of honorary vice-president of the Union française pour le suffrage des femmes (UFSF – French Union for Women's Suffrage). Cécile Brunschvicg (1877–1946) was secretary-general of the UFSF and Jeanne Schmahl (1846–1916) was president.

Eliska Vincent died in 1914. Her death and that of Hubertine Auclert, the two most prominent feminist leaders in France, combined with the disruption of World War I (1914-1918), dealt a severe if temporary blow to the feminist movement. Millions of people died during the war. A 1919 article proclaimed in its title, "France has more need of children than of electors."

== Lost legacy ==
According to Klejman and Rochefort Vincent created le féminisme historique, although "Léopold Lacour is without a doubt the first to undertake an historian's examination of feminism." Vincent was the first archivist of the feminist movement, and collected a huge library, including files on the communards. On her death in 1914 she bequeathed the collection to the Musée social (Social museum) in the hope that it would organize a feminist institute. The museum created a section for women's studies in 1916, but despite the efforts of Vincent's executors, Marguerite Durand and Maria Vérone, the museum did not accept the archives. The legacy, estimated to include 600,000 documents, was rejected in 1919. The reason was the cost of paying off outstanding tax debts. Vincent's collection has disappeared and was probably destroyed.

== Sources ==
- Bard, Christine (June 2003). "Les gardiennes de la mémoire". Bulletin Archives du féminisme (5). Archived from the original on 2018-08-15.
- Bidelman, Patrick Kay (1982). Pariahs stand up!: the founding of the liberal feminist movement in France, 1858-1889. Greenwood Press. ISBN 978-0-313-23006-6.
- Clancy-Smith, Julia Ann; Gouda, Frances (1998). Domesticating the Empire: Race, Gender, and Family Life in French and Dutch Colonialism. University of Virginia Press. ISBN 978-0-8139-1781-8.
- Clark, Linda L. (2008-04-17). Women and Achievement in Nineteenth-Century Europe. Cambridge University Press. ISBN 978-0-521-65098-4.
- Garb, Tamar (1994-01-01). Sisters of the Brush: Women's Artistic Culture in Late Nineteenth-century Paris. Yale University Press. ISBN 978-0-300-05903-8.
- Hause, Steven C. (2002). "Union Française Pour Le Suffrage Des Femmes (UFSF)". In Helen Tierney (ed.). Women's Studies Encyclopedia. Greenwood Press.
- Heyman, Neil M. (1997-01-01). World War I. Greenwood Publishing Group. p. 95. ISBN 978-0-313-29880-6.
- "Il Rito Misto " Il Diritto Umano"". Le Scuole Iniziatiche dell'Antica Saggezza.
- McMillan, James F. (2002-01-08). France and Women, 1789–1914: Gender, Society and Politics. Taylor & Francis. p. 195. ISBN 978-0-203-02015-9.
- Offen, Karen M. (2000). European Feminisms, 1700-1950: A Political History. Stanford University Press. ISBN 978-0-8047-3420-2.
- Offen, Karen (2013). "Women, Citizenship, and Suffrage in France Since 1789". Indiana University Bloomington. Archived from the original on 2015-05-17.
- Rappaport, Helen (2001). Encyclopedia of Women Social Reformers. ABC-CLIO. ISBN 978-1-57607-101-4.
- Sowerwine, Charles (January 1982). Sisters Or Citizens?: Women and Socialism in France Since 1876. Cambridge University Press. ISBN 978-0-521-23484-9.
- "The Woman Movement In France and Its Leader". The Brooklyn Daily Eagle. New York. 1911-09-04 – via newspapers.com.
- Waelti-Walters, Jennifer R.; Hause, Steven C. (1994). Feminisms of the Belle Epoque: A Historical and Literary Anthology. U of Nebraska Press. p. 200. ISBN 978-0-8032-9748-7.
