= Marya Chéliga-Loevy =

Polish writer (1854–1927)

- Marya Chéliga-Loevy
- Born: Mirecka Szeliga; 1854; Jasieniec Solecki, Congress Poland
- Died: 2 January 1927 (aged 72–73)
- Occupation: Writer
- Known for: Feminism

Marya Chéliga-Loevy (or Maria Szeliga, 1854 – 2 January 1927) was a Polish writer, playwright, feminist and pacifist. She was born in Poland but spent much of her life in France.

== Early years ==
Mirecka Szeliga was born into a prosperous family of landowners in Jasieniec Solecki, Poland in 1854, at that time a dependency of Russia. She was an only child. Her father died while she was young, and she was brought up by her mother. She published two novels in 1873, For an ideal and The day before, and also published a collection of poems. A theme that runs through her writing is that of the single woman struggling for independence and constrained by a hypocritical society. Between 1875 and 1876. she made a journey to Prague, Munich, Verona, Padua, Rome and Naples. She and her mother moved to Warsaw in 1876, where she married Stanislaw Jan Czarnowski, her publisher. They almost immediately decided to separate and began divorce proceedings. She stayed in Warsaw until 1880.

Maria Szeliga scandalized her family by taking a Jew as her second husband. Edouard Loevy was an illustrator. He was a native of Warsaw who studied in St. Petersburg and Munich and then settled in Paris. He created several thousand drawings for the Larousse encyclopedia, including portraits.

== Feminism ==
Maria Chéliga-Loevy, as she became known, collaborated with the women's rights activist Maria Deraismes, then founded the Union Universelle des Femmes (Universal Women's Union) in 1889. In a bulletin dated 15 April 1890, she stated that the Union was "openly and independently feminist." In January 1892, Eugénie Potonié-Pierre brought together eight feminist groups in Paris into the Fédération Française des Sociétés Féministes (French Federation of Feminist Societies). The Union Universelle des Femmes joined the Federation. The union did not grow as she had expected, and was dissolved later in 1892.

The Federation's secretary, Aline Valette, founded the weekly tabloid L'Harmonie sociale which first appeared on 15 October 1892 as a means of making contact with working women to understand their concerns. The masthead had the socialist message: "The emancipation of women is in emancipated labor". However, the contributors to the journal, who included Eliska Vincent, Marie Bonnevial and Chéliga-Loevy, were more interested in feminism than socialism. A sentimental novel by Chéliga-Loevy was serialized in the journal. It told the story of an innocent young girl who suffered various misfortunes and in the end embraced socialism.

In 1896, her play L'ornière (The routine) was staged at Les Indépendants in Paris, the story of a woman trapped in an unhappy marriage. It was received well by the critics. She spoke for Poland at the Congres Universel des Libres-Penseurs in September 1889. In 1897, she founded the Théâtre féministe to encourage and promote female playwrights. The theater, located on rue Blanche, closed its doors in 1899 after only two years of operation. Only the dramatists who wrote light pieces, such as Madame Grésac, were truly successful. Chéliga-Loevy published Almanach féministe in 1899. She spoke at the Second International Conference of Feminine Organizations and Institutions in 1900. She and the pioneering woman lawyer Jeanne Chauvin favored giving an unmarried mother the right to seek out the father and demand child support.

== Later years ==
In 1896, Chéliga-Loevy helped found the Ligue des Femmes pour le Désarmement International (League of Women for International Disarmament) and became vice-president of the League. As a pacifist leader in France, she was in contact with pacifists in many other countries. When World War I broke out in 1914, she abandoned pacifism, since she expected Poland to emerge from the war as an independent country. She threw herself into charity work during the war, and continued to be busy in charities for the remainder of her life. She died of heart disease on 2 January 1927 at Chaville, near Paris.
