= Koppe (surname) =

Koppe is a surname. Notable people with this surname include:

- Erwin Koppe (born 1938), German gymnast
- Hans-Peter Koppe (born 1958), German rower
- Joe Koppe (1930–2006), American baseball player
- Johann Benjamin Koppe (1750–1791), German Lutheran theologian
- Louise Koppe (1846–1900), French feminist writer and journalist, and founder of France's first maternity home
- Richard Koppe (1916–1973), American artist
- Wilhelm Koppe (1896–1975), German Nazi commander

== See also ==
- George Cuppy (born George Maceo Koppe; 1869–1922), American professional baseball pitcher
- Kopp (surname)
- Koppes surname
- Koeppe/Köppe
