= Fédération Française des Sociétés Féministes =

French feminist organization

- Formation: 1891
- Type: Association
- Legal status: Defunct
- Purpose: Coordinate feminist groups
- Headquarters: Paris
- Official language: French

The Fédération Française des Sociétés Féministes (French Federation of Feminist Societies) was a short-lived French organization founded in 1891.

== Foundation ==
The Federation was announced in November 1891. Eugénie Potonié-Pierre brought together eight feminist groups in Paris into the Fédération Française des Societés Feministes (French Federation of Feminist Societies). The Union Universelle des Femmes joined the Federation. The Société de l'allaitement maternel, which encouraged breast feeding, also joined. The Fédération française des sociétés féministes was created to deal with the divergences in opinion and approach between different feminist groups. This was the first time the adjective "feminist" had been used in the name of a group. It started to be used by the press in its radical sense. The humanists who belonged to the organization felt that it was in the common interest of both sexes for men to be involved in the movement, in contrast to others who felt the movement was purely the concern of women.

== History ==
Aline Valette joined the committee that organized the first congress in May 1892, and represented a short-lived union of seamstresses at the congress. The congress in 13–15 May 1892 was well-attended, with both social feminists, mainstream feminists and socialists. The congress did not succeed in developing practical proposals or a coherent policy. The congress was well-covered in the press. The daily paper Le Temps published articles on it from 14 to 17 May. The Federation's main task was defined as preparing a Cahier des doléances féminines (List of feminist grievances). Potonie-Pierre resigned as secretary on 17 June 1892 due to a dispute over her authority and was replaced by Valette.

Valette founded the weekly tabloid L'Harmonie sociale which first appeared on 15 October 1892 as a means of making contact with working women to understand their concerns. The masthead had the socialist message: "The emancipation of women is in emancipated labor". However, the contributors to the journal, who included Eliska Vincent, Marie Bonnevial and Marya Chéliga-Loevy, were more interested in feminism than socialism. The journal serialized August Bebel's Woman under socialism and published various texts and resolutions of socialist congresses, although it was not always accurate and was far from Marxist. A sentimental novel by Chéliga-Loevy was serialized in the journal. It told the story of an innocent young girl who suffered various misfortunes and in the end embraced socialism.

The grievance list called for women to have access to all levels of education and to all professions, and demanded that all articles of the Napoleonic code that discriminated against women be abolished. On 1 May 1893 the Federation sent out delegations who deposited copies of the grievance list in the offices of the mayors of the twenty arrondissements in Paris. This turned out to be the only major action the Federation would take. At the 1893 general assembly Valette stated that the Federation consisted of sixteen groups with total membership of 35,000 figures, but the latter numbers had no grounding in reality. Lacking strong leadership, the Federation disintegrated. The last issue of L'Harmonie sociale appeared in July 1893. As secretary of the Federation of Feminist Societies Valette attended the 1893 congress of the Parti Ouvrier Francais (POF - French Workers' Party) and became a member of the POF national council.

== Sources ==
- Arino, Martine (2012). "Christine Bard, Le féminisme au-delà des idées reçues". Esprit Critique. Archived from the original on 2014-11-13.
- Dorvaux, Karine (2014). "Chronologie des droits des femmes et des feminismes Français" (PDF). free.
- Fauré, Christine (April–June 2006). "La naissance d'un anachronisme : " le féminisme pendant la Révolution française "". Annales historiques de la Révolution française (344): 193–195. doi:10.4000/ahrf.6433.
- Sowerwine, Charles (1982). Sisters Or Citizens?: Women and Socialism in France Since 1876. Cambridge University Press. ISBN 978-0-521-23484-9.
- Véronique, Darmangeat (2013-04-15). L'allaitement malin: Le livre de référence le plus complet pour allaiter sereinement. Leduc.s Éditions. ISBN 978-2-84899-887-9.
- Viot-Southard, Katia (2008). Representations of womanhood in fin-de-siecle France: Women Theater and its ambivalences. ISBN 978-0-549-65008-9.
