= Social feminism =

Feminist movement

Social feminism is a feminist movement that advocates for social rights and special accommodations for women. It was first used to describe members of the women's suffrage movement in the late nineteenth and early twentieth centuries who were concerned with social problems that affected women and children. They saw obtaining the vote mainly as a means to achieve their reform goals rather than a primary goal in itself. After women gained the right to vote, social feminism continued in the form of labor feminists who advocated for protectionist legislation and special benefits for women. The term is widely used, although some historians have questioned its validity.

== Origin of term ==
William L. O'Neill introduced the term "social feminism" in his 1969 history of the feminist movement Everyone Was Brave: The Rise and Fall of Feminism in America. He used the term to cover women involved in municipal civic reform, settlement houses and improving labor conditions for women and children. For them, O'Neill said, "women's rights was not an end in itself, as it was to the most ardent feminists". O'Neill contrasted social feminism with the "hard-core" feminism of women such as Elizabeth Cady Stanton and Susan B. Anthony who saw obtaining women's rights or women's suffrage as the main objective. Social feminists typically accepted traditional views of women as compassionate, nurturing and child-centered, while O'Neill's “hard-core feminists” were often alienated from these conventions.

Naomi Black in Social Feminism (1989) distinguishes social feminism from "equity feminism". Equity feminism may be liberal, Marxist or socialist, but it demands equal rights for women within the male-defined framework. Social feminism, either maternal, cultural or radical, is based on female values. It aims to expand the role of women beyond the private sphere, and to fundamentally transform society. Social feminist organizations should therefore exclude men to maintain their distinctive female characteristics. They should not attempt to be like men, since their distinctive nature may be a strength in politics. There is inevitably a risk that social feminists will align with conservative causes. In the short term social feminism is separatist, but in the longer term it is transformative, since men have lost the exclusive power of decision-making.

Social feminism is sometimes associated with maternal feminism. This philosophy considers that mothering should be used as a model for politics, and women's maternal instincts uniquely qualify them to participate in a "female" sphere. However, feminists are not all necessarily maternalist, and maternal thinking does not necessarily promote the goals of all forms of social feminism.

== Activities ==
=== France ===
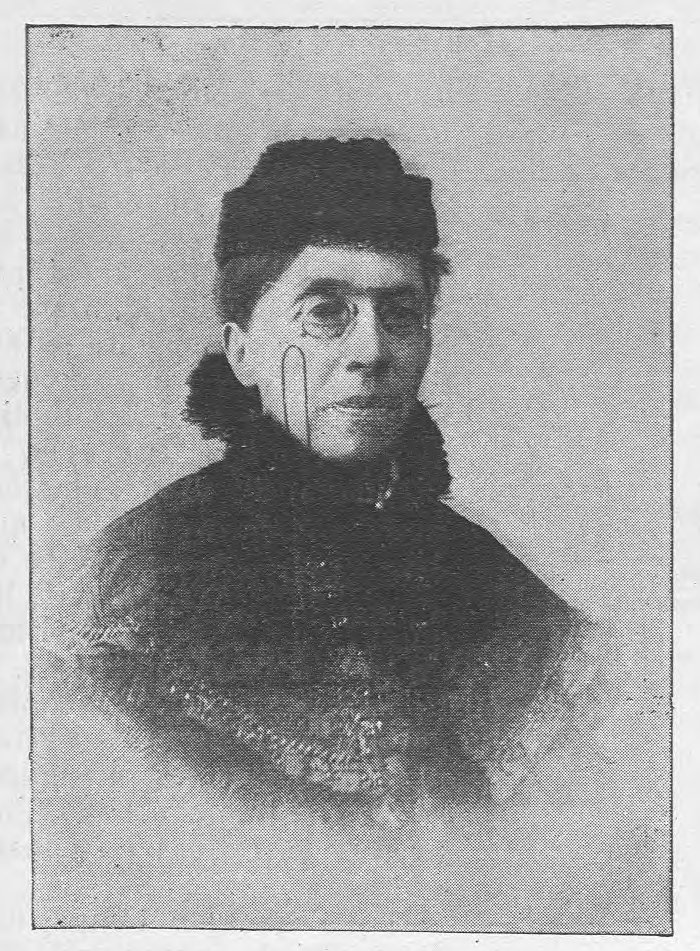
Eugénie Potonié-Pierre was a French leader of social feminism.

In France in the 1890s feminism was mainly confined to bourgeois women. Women such as Eugénie Potonié-Pierre try to broaden the movement by combining their social concerns with their feminism, and to bring working-class women into the feminist movement. The Fédération Française des Sociétés Féministes was founded at the start of 1892 and held a well-attended congress in 13–15 May 1892, with both social feminists, mainstream feminists and socialists. The congress did not succeed in developing practical proposals or a coherent policy. Their cautious attempts at social feminism were not successful. Instead, a working women's movement developed within the socialist movement.

A final attempt to create a social feminist movement in France was made by Marguerite Durand, founder of the social feminist paper La Fronde, who arranged the 1900 international women's rights congress. Durand saw social feminism as more than an expression of concern about social issues, but as a means to expand the base of the feminist movement. She felt that working women would create the feminist revolution, although bourgeois women would remain in control. She included moderate socialists on the organizing committee.

Most of the 500 attendees at the congress were wealthy women. They were willing to vote for an eight-hour day for factory workers, but baulked at giving the same terms to their maids. There were two socialist women, Elizabeth Renaud and Louise Saumoneau, who were not willing to simply accept Durand's lead. In the end, the congress finalized the split between feminists and working women. Saumoneau became hostile to feminism, seeing the class struggle as more important. She denounced "bourgeois" feminism and took little interest in problems unique to women.

=== America ===
Social feminists in the US around the turn of the century were more interested in broad social issues than narrow political struggles, and saw early feminists like Anthony and Stanton as selfish in their demand for the vote for its own sake. They saw the vote as a means by which they could improve society. The social feminist and conservative Woman's Christian Temperance Union (WCTU) led by Frances Willard (1839–98) was not interested in women's suffrage, and perhaps actively opposed, until around 1880. At that time it came round to the idea that suffrage was the only way to gain the changes in legislation needed to advance temperance. The goal was still temperance, and suffrage was an expedient means to achieve that goal. In the long term the WCTU brought more women into the suffrage movement, but in the short term it was a competitor to suffrage organizations.

In America the mainstream of the women's rights movement were social feminists. Often they saw women as inherently different in their point of view from men. They campaigned for social improvements and protection of the interests of women. Issues included education, property rights, job opportunities, labor laws, consumer protection, public health, child protection and the vote. Florence Kelley (1859–1932) and Jane Addams (1860–1935) exemplified social feminists. They believed that gaining the vote was essential for them to achieve their social objectives.

In the early 20th century social feminist leaders of the National American Woman Suffrage Association (NAWSA) such as Maud Wood Park (1871–1955) and Helen H. Gardener (1853–1925) worked for women's suffrage. Their approach involved quiet lobbying of leading male politicians, while the more radical National Woman's Party took a more aggressive approach with demonstrations and picketing. Social feminism endorsed many traditional views of gender roles, did not threaten patriarchal power and may even have reinforced traditional arrangements, but the strategy was successful in 1920 in the campaign for the vote. After this breakthrough the National Woman's Party proposed the Equal Rights Amendment (ERA). The ERA was bitterly opposed by the social feminists who saw it as undermining many of gains they had made in the treatment of women workers.

In the period after the vote had been won there was a decline in social feminism in the US. According to William O'Neill "Adventure was now to be had, for the most part, in struggling against not social problems but social conventions. Drinking, smoking, dancing, sexual novelties, daring literature and avant-garde art now filled the vacuum created by the collapse of social feminism." However, Labor feminists continued to agitate for reform in the workplace. Labor feminists did not want to end all distinctions based on sex, only those that hurt women. For example, they felt that state laws that put in place wage floors and hour ceilings benefited women.

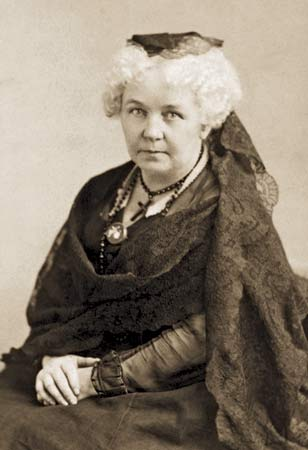
Elizabeth Cady Stanton supported various reform causes before focusing exclusively on women's rights.

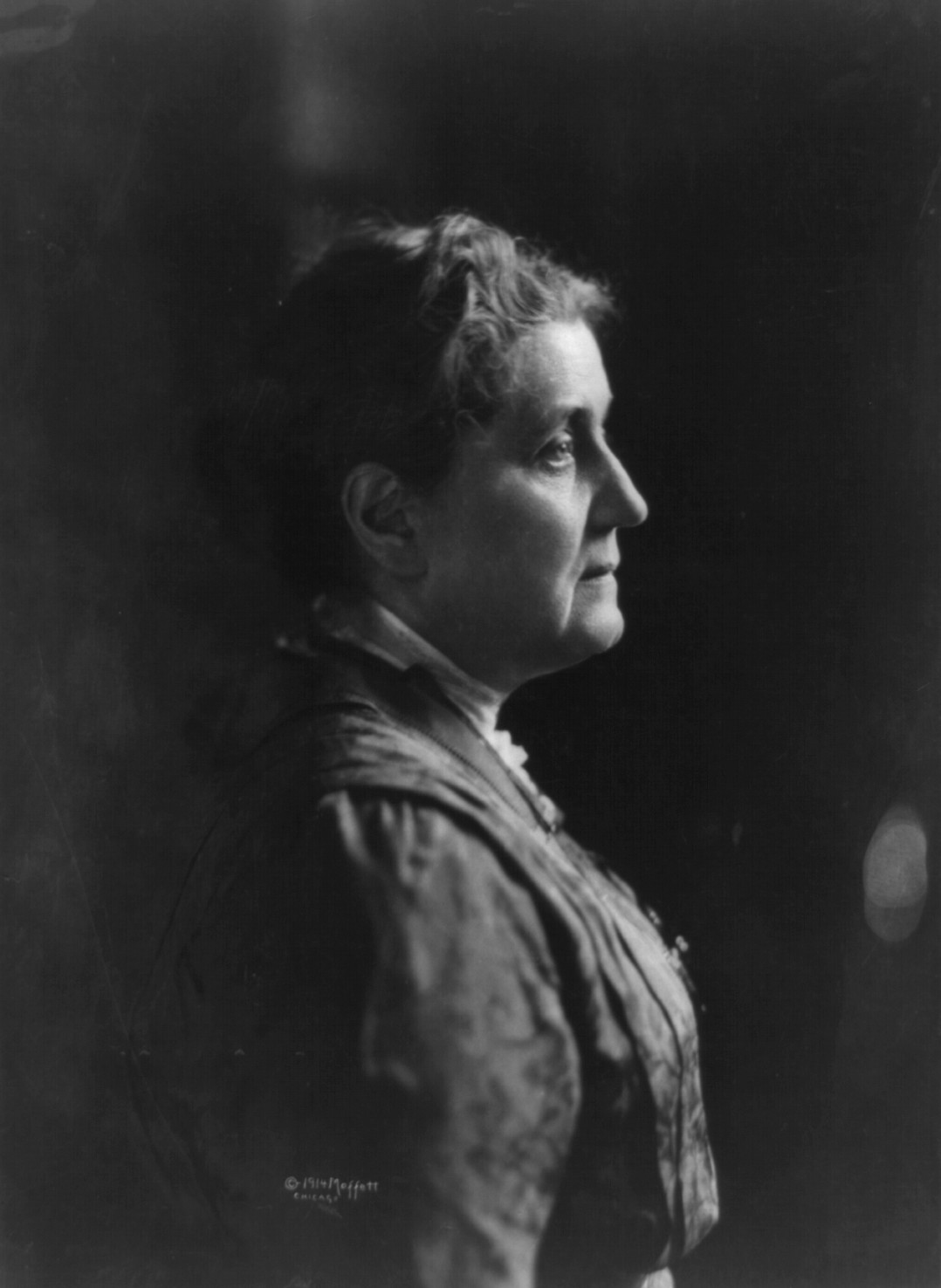
Jane Addams was a social feminist who supported women's suffrage.

== Critique ==
The concept of social feminism is useful in defining a range of activities, but the idea that it is incompatible with radical feminism may be misleading. In The Ideas of the Woman's Suffrage Movement, 1890–1920 (1965), Aileen S. Kraditor contrasted belief in the natural justice of women having the right to vote, common among suffragists up to the end of the 19th century, with belief in the "expediency" of women having the vote so they could address social issues, more common in the early 20th century. However, Kraditor saw a gradual shift in emphasis from "justice" to "expediency" in the rationales for women's suffrage rather than a conflict between the two positions. Organizations such as the Woman's Christian Temperance Union were primarily social feminist while the National American Woman Suffrage Association was primarily "hard-core" in O'Neill's sense, but there was considerable overlap in their membership. Activists such as Mary Ritter Beard, Florence Kelley and Maud Younger fall into both categories.

== General sources ==
- Buechler, Steven M. (1990). Women's Movements in the United States: Woman Suffrage, Equal Rights, and Beyond. Rutgers University Press. ISBN 978-0-8135-1559-5.
- Calás, Marta B.; Smitcich, Linda; Bourne, Kristina A. (2007). "Feminist Analyses of 'gender and entrepreneurship'". Handbook on Women in Business and Management. Edward Elgar Publishing. ISBN 978-1-84720-413-4.
- Cobble, Dorothy S. (August 2005). "The Forgotten American Feminists". Bulletin of the Society for the Study of Working Women. 48.
- Cott, Nancy F. (December 1989). "What's in a Name? The Limits of 'Social Feminism;' or, Expanding the Vocabulary of Women's History". The Journal of American History. 76 (3). Organization of American Historians: 809–829. doi:10.2307/2936422. JSTOR 2936422.
- Dietz, Mary G. (2002). Turning Operations: Feminism, Arendt, and Politics. Psychology Press. ISBN 978-0-415-93244-8.
- French, Marilyn (2008). From Eve to Dawn: Revolutions and the Struggles for Justice in the 20th Century. Feminist Press at CUNY. ISBN 978-1-55861-628-8.
- Geary, Dick (1989-04-17). Labour and Socialist Movements in Europe Before 1914. Berg. p. 86. ISBN 978-0-85496-705-6.
- Rose, Kenneth D. (1997-06-01). American Women and the Repeal of Prohibition. NYU Press. ISBN 978-0-8147-7466-3.
- Smith, Bonnie G., ed. (2008). "Social Feminism". Oxford Encyclopedia of Women in World History. Oxford University Press. ISBN 9780195148909.
- Sowerwine, Charles (1982). Sisters Or Citizens?: Women and Socialism in France Since 1876. Cambridge University Press. ISBN 978-0-521-23484-9.
- Zerilli, Linda M. G. (2005-10-03). Feminism and the Abyss of Freedom. University of Chicago Press. ISBN 978-0-226-98134-5.
