= Association pour le Droit des Femmes =

Association pour le Droit des Femmes was a French women's rights organization, founded by Maria Deraismes and Léon Richer in 1870. It was the first women's rights organization in France. Its purpose was to work for equal rights for women and men.

== Works ==
While Richier maintained the view that women should not be given the vote before they no longer favored the Catholic church so much that women suffrage would result in a backlash of a progressive development of society, Maria Deraismes, who previously shared this view, took the stand that women should be given the vote in order to be more progressive than their present state allowed, rather than the other way around. Deraismes therefore left the Association pour le Droit des Femmes and founded the Ligue Française pour le Droit des Femmes in 1882, which resulted in Richiers association being replaced by LFDF as a leading women's movement in France.
