= Émilie de Morsier =

Swiss feminist, pacifist and abolitionist

- Born: Émilie Naville; 31 October 1843; Vernier, Geneva, Switzerland
- Died: 13 January 1896 (aged 52); Paris, France
- Occupations: Feminist, pacifist, abolitionist

Émilie de Morsier (31 October 1843 – 13 January 1896) was a Swiss feminist, pacifist and abolitionist.

== Life ==
Emilie Naville was born in Vernier in the Canton of Geneva on 31 October 1843, daughter of Louis Naville and Anne Todd. Her family included prominent Protestants pastors. Her father was mayor of Vernier. In 1864 she married Gustave de Morsier, a banker. Their son Auguste de Morsier (1864–1923), an engineer and philanthropist, was involved in many generous causes including the International Abolitionist Federation, the Swiss Association for Women's Suffrage and International Philarmenian League. Other children were Edouard (1866–1949) and Louis (1872–1937).

In 1867 Emilie de Morsier became a member of the International League for Peace and Freedom. The family moved to Paris in 1868. During the Franco-Prussian War (1870–71) Emilie de Morsier served as a nurse in a homeopathic health center. She became a feminist leader. She helped convince French women philanthropists to support an egalitarian reform agenda, defending women's rights in terms of women's duties.

In 1875 Emilie de Morsier became a member of the executive committee of the British and Continental Federation for the Abolition of Regulated Prostitution. The league was against state toleration of extra-marital sexual activity, but was also against the enslavement of women that resulted from official regulations. In 1879 she was one of the founders of the French Association pour l'abolition de la prostitution réglementée, authorized by a police ordinance of 16 June 1879. Victor Schœlcher was the president, the committee was co-chaired by Yves Guyot and Mrs. H. Chapman, and Maria Deraismes and Emilie de Morsier were committee members. She attended the second congress of the abolition federation in Geneva between 27 September and 4 October 1990, as did Yves Guyot and Auguste de Morsier, where it became clear that the priority had shifted to the liberal agenda of removing the state's powers of registration and detention, and guaranteeing the rights of individual liberty and common law.

Emilie de Morsier was interested in theosophy and became secretary-general of the Societé Theosophique d'Orient et d'Occident. On 11 June 1884 she was present at a demonstration of psychic power by Madame Blavatsky, who read the contents of a sealed letter that she held up to her forehead. In 1889 the French government sponsored a "woman's congress" presided over by Jules Simon, which celebrated the role of women in society, and their charitable activities in particular. Feminists led by Léon Richer (1824–1911) and Maria Deraismes organized an alternative Congrès Francais et International du Droit des Femmes, held in Paris 25–29 June 1889. Emilie de Morsier was one of the organizers of the government congress, but also attended the feminist congress and donated money to help support it.

Between 1887 and 1896 Emilie de Morsier was president of the board of directors of the Society for Former Prisoners of Saint-Lazare, an organization that tried to assist the female detainees (mostly prostitutes) to rejoin society. She attended an international prison conference in Paris in 1895, where she heard Marie-Anne Dupuy talk about adjusting prison policy to recognize gender differences. Morsier praised Dupuy's report, saying that a higher law than man-made law made the sexes equal. The white slave trade must be abolished, since it was the basis of legal prostitution. Morsier and Dupuy agreed that the existing laws made it difficult for prostitutes to find other work.

Emilie de Morsier died in Paris on 13 January 1896.

== Publications ==
Emilie de Morsier wrote a book on the Mission of Women:

- Morsier, Emilie de; Schure, Edouard (1897) [1879]. La Mission de la Femme: Discours Et Fragments. Librairie Fischbacher. p. 221.

Emilie de Morsier translated several works into French including:

- Elizabeth Stuart Phelps Ward The Gates Ajar and Hedged In,
- Emilie Ashurst Venturi Joseph Mazzini, a Memoir
- Giuseppe Mazzini The Duties of Man and Thoughts on Democracy (essays)

== See also ==
- List of peace activists

== Sources ==
- Berchtold, Alfred (2000). Emile Jaques-Dalcroze et son temps. L'AGE D'HOMME. ISBN 978-2-8251-1354-7.
- Bulletin de la Société d'Histoire et d'Archéologie de Genève. Librairie Droz. 2008. ISBN 978-2-600-05045-6.
- Clark, Linda L. (2000-12-21). The Rise of Professional Women in France: Gender and Public Administration since 1830. Cambridge University Press. ISBN 978-1-139-42686-2.
- Corbin, Alain (1996-09-01). Women for Hire: Prostitution and Sexuality in France After 1850. Harvard University Press. ISBN 978-0-674-95544-8.
- "Editor's Portfolio". Illustrated Science Monthly. Swan Sonnenschein, Lowrey. 1884.
- Fauré, Christine (2004-06-02). Political and Historical Encyclopaedia of Women. Routledge. ISBN 978-1-135-45691-7.
- Moses, Claire Goldberg (1984). French Feminism in the 19th Century. SUNY Press. ISBN 978-0-87395-859-2.
- Palmieri, Daniel (2010-01-26). "Morsier, Emilie de". Dictionnaire historique de la Suisse (in French). Berne.
- Stanton, Theodore (1884). The woman question in Europe: a series of original essays. G. P. Putnam's sons. p. 264.
- Waelti-Walters, Jennifer R.; Hause, Steven C. (1994). Feminisms of the Belle Epoque: A Historical and Literary Anthology. U of Nebraska Press. p. 168. ISBN 0-8032-9748-3.
