= Amélie Bosquet =

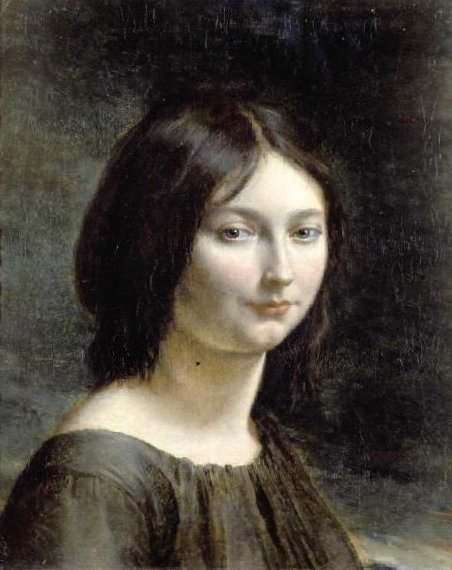
- Portrait of Amelie Bosquet of when she was 14 years old by Jean-Baptiste Parelle.
- Born: 1 June 1815; Rouen, France
- Died: 26 March 1904 (aged 88); Neuilly-sur-Seine, France
- Occupations: Author; women's rights activist

Amélie Bosquet was born in Rouen on July 1, 1815, and died in Neuilly-sur-Seine on March 26, 1904. She was a traditionalist French writer, and pioneer in the domain of legend.

== Biography ==
Born in the Martainville neighborhood, Amélie Bosquet studied at l'institution Chevalier, which finds itself in front of the Saint-Ouen Abbey. She herself described her early years and gave a curious picture of the Bourbon Restoration in one of the last articles she wrote, which was published in 1897 in the Revue Bleue under the title of Une écolière sons la Restauration, « fragments de mémoires inédits ».

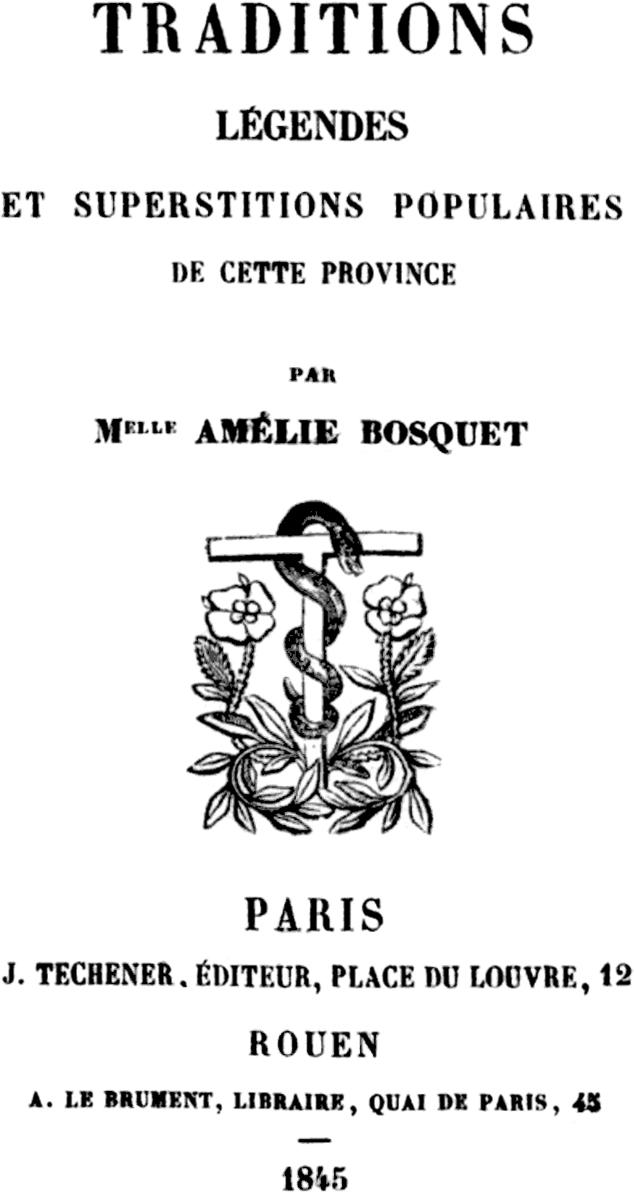
Frontispiece of la Normandie romanesque et merveilleuse.

Amelie Bosquet debuted as a writer in around 1834 in the Revue de Rouen by writing a series of legends on Bonsecours and the area surrounding Rouen. It is a preamble to the important work, it was republished several times (1970, 1971, 1978 and 1987), it was published in 1845 by Techener and Le Brument as la Normandie romanesque et merveilleuse; traditions, légendes et superstitions populaires de cette province. In this work, she reunites and comments on the traditions, legends and superstitions of Normandy. Later on, with the collaboration of Raymond Bordeaux, she directed the grand monumental publication of la Normandie illustrée. Monuments sites et costumes, avec les lithographies de Charpentier.

She began to write a historical novel in 1846, under the pseudonym of "Émile Bosquet", named Rosemonde. She then published Une femme nulle, Une passion en province et Louise Meunier. Through the intermediary of her compatriot Jules Levallois, she came into contact with Anaïs, the wife of her compatriot Adolphe Guéroult, and in 1867 she published Une femme bien élevée in l'Opinion nationale, in which she portrayed the religious conflicts within families. She published Roman des ouvrières, a picture of the workers of the Rouen spinning mills, which takes place in the working-class districts of Saint-Maclou, Saint-Vivien and Clos-Saint-Marc. In Jacqueline de Vardon, whose title takes the name of her paternal grandmother, who was from Condé-sur-Nolreau. It was published in Le Temps, Amélie Bosquet describes a view of Rouen that Flaubert called a "masterpiece". She published several more novels between the years of 1874 and 1876.

She met Flaubert at the municipal library of Rouen, and he encouraged her. However, their relations ceased when Flaubert mocked the Feminist cause in l'Éducation sentimentale in 1869.

In 1892, through the intermediary of the erudite art critic Alfred Darcel, she donated to the library of Rouen an entire collection of autographs by George Sand, Sainte-Beuve, Champfleury, Deschanel, Maxime Du Camp, Cuvillier-Fleury and Méry, from the collector Sauvageot. Among this series is a series of letters from Flaubert, who had introduced the novelist to George Sand. At the same time of these autographs, which had accompanying drawings, Amélie Bosquet made a donation to the museum of Rouen, a portrait of her by Jean-Baptiste Parelle.

Amélie Bosquet contributed to the Revue de Rouen, l'Opinion Nationale, Revue de Paris, and the Journal de Rouen.

A staunch feminist, she contributed to the journal le Droit des femmes. She was a member of the central management committee of the Association pour le Droit des Femmes. Amélie Bosquet retired three or four years before her death, in Neuilly in the Galignani retirement home, where she died in 1904, at the age of 88.

== Homage ==
A place was named after her in Rouen in the Saint-Clément - Jardin-des-Plantes neighborhood.
