= Koppes =

Koppes is a surname. Notable people with the surname include:

- Johannes Joseph Koppes (1843–1918), Luxembourgian Roman Catholic bishop
- Michele Koppes, Dutch professor
- Peter Koppes (born 1955), Australian guitarist

== See also ==
- Koppe (surname)
- Kopper (surname)
