= Aline Valette =

French feminist and socialist

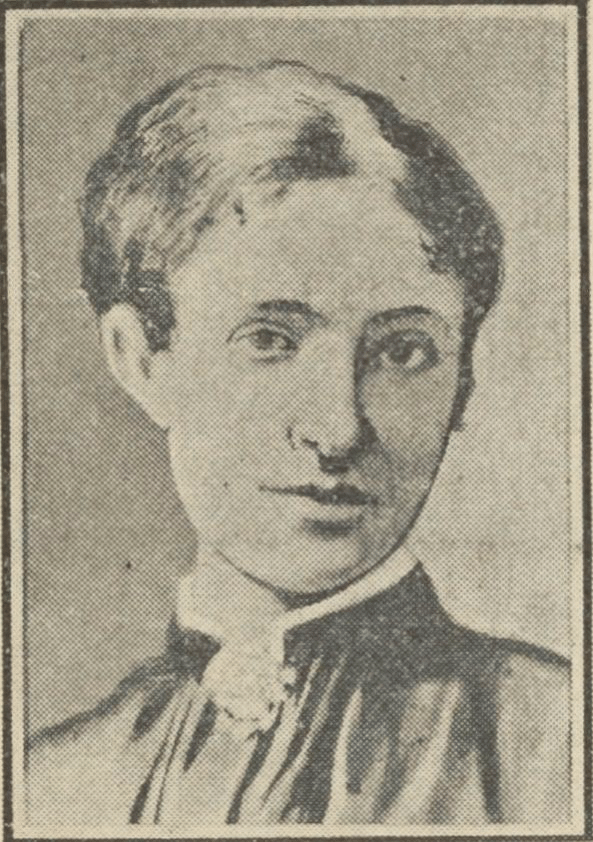
- Born: Alphonsine-Eulalie Goudeman; 5 October 1850; Lille, France
- Died: 21 March 1899 (aged 48); Arcachon, Gironde, France
- Occupation: School teacher
- Known for: Feminism, socialism

Aline Valette (née Alphonsine Goudeman (5 October 1850 – 21 March 1899) was a French feminist and socialist. She believed that society should provide support to women engaged in motherhood, the most important of all occupations.

== Early years ==
Alphonsine-Eulalie Goudeman was born in Lille on 5 October 1850. She was the daughter of a railroad worker, trained as a teacher, and was employed by a private school in the working-class district of Montmartre, Paris. From 1873 to 1878 she taught at a municipal vocational school for young girls at 26 rue Ganneron, and she then taught young girls at 12 rue Saint-Lazare until 1880. In 1878 at the founding congress of the teachers' union led by Marie Bonnevial she was elected secretary. She held this position until 1880.

In 1880 Aline married M. Valette, a prosperous lawyer, and left work. She separated from her husband around 1885. While a single mother raising two sons, she wrote a handbook for homemakers that conveyed very traditional values about a woman's work at home. For many years La journée de la petite ménagère was used by schools in Paris. The guide ran through many editions in the years that followed. Valette belonged to the Charity of Women Discharged from Saint-Lazare Prison, which attempted to reform prostitutes, and wrote a pamphlet for the charity.

== Socialist and feminist activity ==
In the 1880s Valette worked as an unpaid volunteer labor inspector in the Paris region. At the age of forty she became a socialist in response to what she had seen of factory conditions. She became a member of a Guesdist study group and in 1889 represented this group at the International Socialist Congress. She attended the 1891 international congress in Brussels as a confirmed Guesdist. On 29 June 1891 a judicial separation from her husband was pending. She was earning about 2,000 francs a year from la Journée de la petit menagere and from teaching. Her husband, who lived in Algeria, had been ordered to pay her alimony of 200 francs a month, but had not sent her anything. She had two children aged eight and ten who, in accordance with a court order, were living with the family of her lawyer at Sèvres.

Valette was among the women such as Marie Guillot, Séverine, Maria Vérone and Marie Bonnevial who campaigned for women's right to vote, for reform of the civil code (which treated a woman as a minor) and for access by women to all topics of study and all professions. In January 1892 Eugénie Potonié-Pierre brought together eight feminist groups in Paris into the Fédération Française des Sociétés Féministes (French Federation of Feminist Societies). Valette joined the committee that organized the first congress in May 1892, and represented a short-lived union of seamstresses at the congress. On 17 June 1892, due to a dispute about control of the Federation, Potonié-Pierre resigned from her position as secretary and was replaced by Valette.

The Federation's main task had been defined as preparing a Cahier des doléances féminines (List of women's grievances). Valette founded the weekly tabloid L'Harmonie sociale which first appeared on 15 October 1892 as a means of making contact with working women to understand their concerns. The masthead had the socialist message: "The emancipation of women is in emancipated labor". However, the contributors to the journal, who included Eliska Vincent, Marie Bonnevial and Marya Chéliga-Loevy (Maria Szeliga), were more interested in feminism than socialism. The journal serialized August Bebel's Woman under socialism and published various texts and resolutions of socialist congresses, although it was not always accurate and was far from Marxist. L'Harmonie sociale ceased publication in 1893. In 1893 she co-authored Socialisme et Sexualisme: Programme du parti socialiste féminin. After this she was an advocate of "sexualism", a theory in which she claimed that evolutionary biology demanded that women and children should receive greater support from society than men.

As secretary of the Federation of Feminist Societies Valette attended the 1893 congress of the Parti Ouvrier Francais (POF - French Workers' Party) and became a member of the POF national council. Valette was permanent secretary of the POF from 1896 until her death in 1899. Valette's health began to deteriorate, and during the winter of 1897-98 she coughed continuously. She was not able to attend the 1898 POF congress, but did submit a draft resolution on woman's rights, which called for socialist municipalities to hold unofficial women's ballots at the same time as the official men's ballots as a step towards women's suffrage. No women attended the 1898 POF congress, and the draft resolution was not heard.

In April 1898 Valette went to Arcachon, to the south of Bordeaux, in the hope that warm weather and mineral water would cure her tuberculosis. She died at Arcachon on 21 March 1899, aged forty-eight. Women socialists later gave her the status of a martyr. The POF erected a small monument to Valette in the cemetery of Arcachon depicting a sun illuminating the world. It bears the legend « La femme doit être affranchie par le travail affranchi » ("The emancipation of women is in emancipated labor").

== Views ==
Valette maintained that the socialist program met all the feminist demands. From late 1897 her survey of women industrial workers began to appear in La Fronde. In it she showed how large this labor force had become, and how many handicaps there were. Women were not unionized, were not represented on the conseils de prud'hommes that resolved labor disputes, did not have the vote and often received starvation wages. She said "Woman's dignity and independence, like that of man, has no surer guarantee than work."

However, Valette believed strongly in the importance of motherhood, and was impatient of women who chose not to bear children. Valette agreed with Karl Marx that women were economically oppressed, but argued that the community should support mothering as the most important, and therefore highest status, of all occupations. In the first issue of L'Harmonie sociale Valette's lead article said that by taking the "artificial role of producer" women had neglected their "natural role of reproducer." She looked forward to "the happy era when women will be returned to their biological role of the creator and educator of the species." This was far from socialist or feminist orthodoxy.

== Bibliography ==
- Mme Valette (1883). La Journée de la petite ménagère, par Mme Valette. Paris: G. Delarue.
- Mme A. Valette (1889). Oeuvre des libérées de Saint-Lazare, fondée en 1870, reconnue d'utilité publique par décret du 26 janvier 1885. Paris: F. Guy.
- Aline Valette; Dr. Z. (Pierre Bonnier) (1893). Socialisme et Sexualisme: Programme du parti socialiste féminin. Paris: Beaudelot.
- Marie Hèléne Zylberberg-Hocquard; Evelyne Diebolt, eds. (1984). Aline Valette, Marcelle Capy: Femmes et travail au XIXe si-ecle: Enquêtes de La Fronde at La Bataile syndicaliste. Paris: Syros.
