= Koeppe =

Koeppe or Köppe is a German surname. Notable people with the surname include:

- Hugo Fischer-Köppe (1890–1937), German film actor
- Leonhard Koeppe (1884–1969), German ophthalmologist
- Sigrun Koeppe (born 1937), German film director and camerawoman
- Wolfgang Köppe (1926–2018), German artist

== See also ==
- Koppe (surname)
