= Denis-François Camusat =

French historian

- Born: 1697
- Died: 1732 (aged 34–35)
- Occupation: historian

Denis-François Camusat (French: [dəni fʁɑ̃swa kamyza]; 1697 – 1732) was a French historian, grand nephew of Nicholas Camusat.

Camusat produced works such as Hist. Critiques des Journaux qui s'impriment en France and Bibliotheque des Livres nouveaux.

== Biography ==
François-Denis Camusat was the son of a lawyer at the Parliament of Burgundy, originally from Troyes, and the nephew of Nicholas Camusat. In 1716, he published A History of Printed Newspapers in France, which brought him to prominence. He entered the service of Cardinal d'Estrées as a librarian and was tasked with purchasing books in Holland, where he spent the last years of his life in precarious financial circumstances. There he published several works on literary history, particularly on newspapers and the press.

Among these works, one of the most notable was published anonymously in 1734, two years after his death. It is the Critical History of Journals, in which he provides a comprehensive overview of all French journals and periodicals, including, among the best known, the Journal des sçavans and the Mémoires de l'Académie des inscriptions et belles-lettres, their origins, their contributors, and their objectives. It is likely the first treatise on this subject, providing numerous details not found anywhere else.

Together with Louis Coquelet and Pierre Carle, he published a work in Paris in 1726–1727 on charlatans, boatmen, and sellers of gunpowder and panaceas, titled Critique of Charlatanism, divided into several speeches, in the form of panegyrics, composed and delivered by Herself, which demonstrates that charlatanism and intellectual fraud are not phenomena of modern times.

For several years, a controversy pitted François-Denis Camusat against the Dutch writer Justus van Effen, author notably of The Dutch Spectator” (1731), who wrote in French and translated Jonathan Swift and Daniel Defoe into the language of Molière: while primarily a personal feud, this controversy also reflects the clash between two conceptions of journalism.

He also published editions of works by Abbé de Choisy and François Eudes de Mézeray, as well as poetry by Abbé de Chaulieu and Charles Auguste de la Fare.

== Sources ==
- Denis-François Camusat entry on The general biographical dictionary - Revised by A. Chalmers
