= Paule Mink =

French feminist and socialist revolutionary

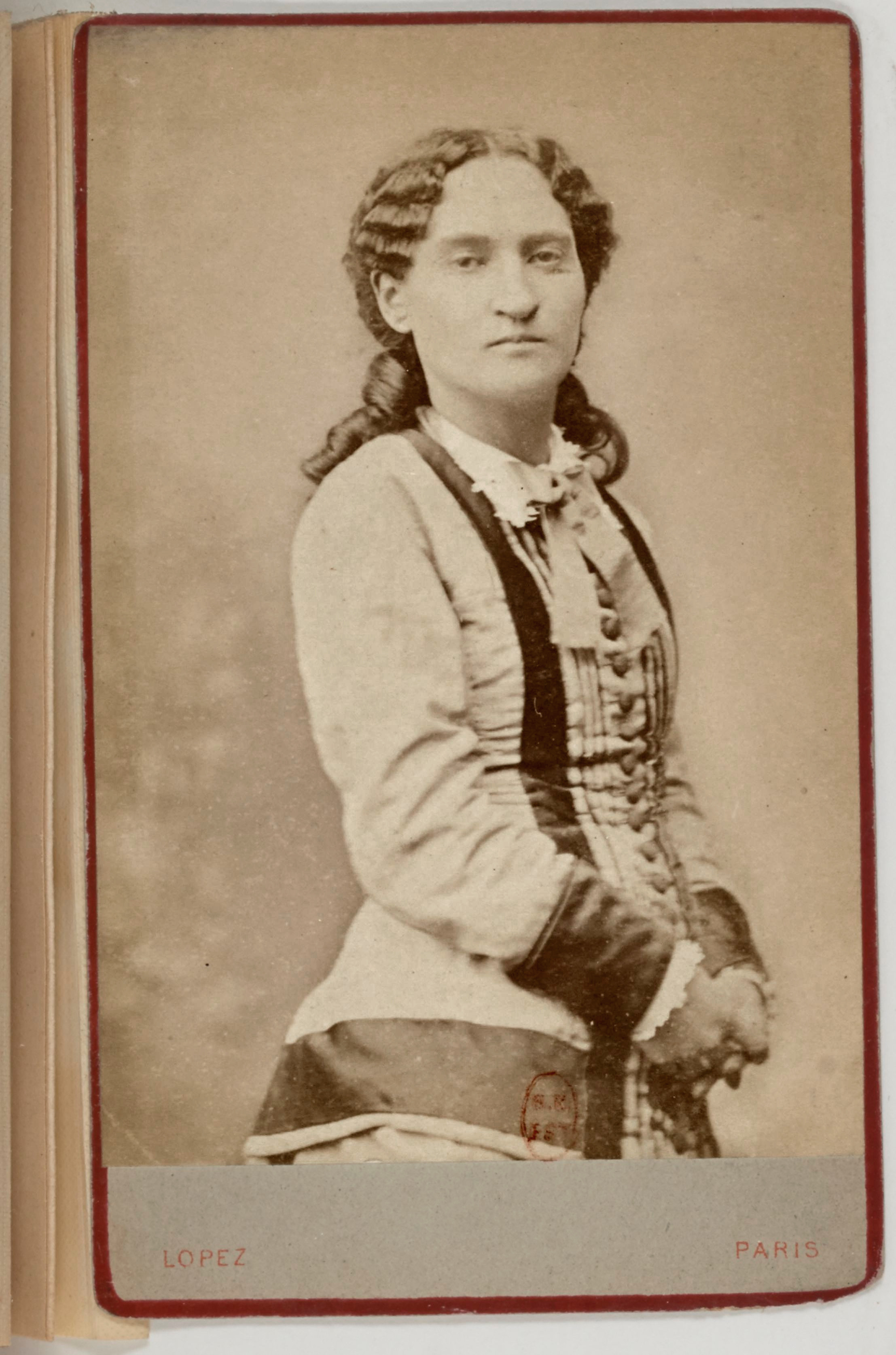
- Born: Adèle Paulina Mekarska; November 9, 1839; Clermont-Ferrand, France
- Died: April 28, 1901 (aged 61); 16th arrondissement of Paris, France
- Known for: feminist and socialist revolutionary

Paule Mink (born Adèle Paulina Mekarska; November 9, 1839 – April 28, 1901) was a French feminist and socialist revolutionary of Polish descent. She participated in the Paris Commune and in the First International. Her pseudonym is also sometimes spelled Minck.

== Early life ==
Adèle Paulina Mekarska was born on 9 November 1839, in Clermont-Ferrand. Her father, Count Jean Nepomucène Mekarski, was a Polish officer who had gone into exile after the unsuccessful Polish uprising of 1830; he was a relative of the last Polish king, Stanislas II. Her mother was an aristocrat, Jeanne-Blanche Cornelly de la Perrière. Adèle's parents were enlightened liberals who apparently became adherents of the utopian socialism of Henri de Saint-Simon. Adèle was well-educated, mostly by private tutors. She had two younger brothers, Louis and Jules; both participated in the Polish uprising of 1863 and in the Paris Commune.

Adèle became a republican and an opponent of the régime of Napoléon III sometime in the 1850s. As a young woman she was married to a Polish aristocrat, Prince Bohdanowicz, with whom she had two daughters, Anna and Wanda. Nothing much is known about this epoch in her life, but the marriage seems not to have been a happy one and ended in divorce. Neither the date of her marriage to, nor that of her divorce from, Bohdanowicz are known. Possibly marriage turned Adèle's thoughts toward the oppression of women. In 1867, she moved to Paris, where she gave language courses and worked as a seamstress. She also associated with Polish patriotic organisations and with revolutionary socialist circles.

In 1866 a feminist group called the Société pour la Revendication du Droit des Femmes began to meet at the house of André Léo. Members included Paule Minck, Louise Michel, Eliska Vincent, Élie Reclus and his wife Noémie, Mme Jules Simon and Caroline de Barrau. Maria Deraismes also participated. Because of the broad range of opinions, the group decided to focus on the subject of improving girls' education.

Adèle first burst on the public scene in 1868, when she began speaking and writing about women's issues and socialism. She was convinced that the emancipation of women could only be fully accomplished through the abolition of capitalism. She contributed to the venerable journal La Réforme and joined the First International. With her friend André Léo she founded the oddly-named Female Workers' Fraternal Society (Société fraternelle de l'ouvrière). It was based on mutualist principles inspired by Pierre-Joseph Proudhon. Adèle was now calling herself 'Paule Mink' or 'Minck' (she used both spellings) and became a tireless orator at socialist and feminist meetings. She was also active in providing aid to Polish refugees from the Russian empire.

At some time, Adèle had a relationship with the painter Jean-Baptiste Noro, with whom she had two more daughters, named Mignon and Jeanne-Héna.

== The Paris Commune ==
In 1870, Napoléon III went to war with Germany. As much a French as a Polish patriot, Paule Mink actively assisted in the French war effort and apparently distinguished herself to such an extent by her engagement at Auxerre that she was offered the Legion of Honour, one of France's highest awards. However, her love of France had not diminished her opposition to Napoléon III, and she refused the medal. The Franco-Prussian War went badly for Napoléon III, and in late 1870, his government fell. Paule Mink was then in Paris and became active in the defence of the besieged city. She supported the uprising of the Paris Commune and was a prominent revolutionary orator at the republican clubs of St. Sulpice and Nôtre Dame. She was a member of the Committee of Vigilance of Montmartre and organised a free school for the poor at the church of St.-Pierre. With Louise Michel, André Léo, Nathalie Lemel, Anne Jaclard and other prominent feminists, she organised a Women's Union and participated in the Commune's committee on women's rights. As always, she tirelessly advanced the argument that the struggle for feminism must be linked to the struggle for socialism. Paule Mink also made several tours to the provinces to drum up support for the Paris Commune in other cities; somehow she always managed to get through the German siege. She was absent on one of these tours during the Bloody Week (Semaine sanglante) and the suppression of the Commune. That is how she managed to evade capture and escape from France.

== Later years ==
Like many refugees from the Paris Commune, Paule Mink settled in Switzerland, where she associated with the anarchist leader James Guillaume. She attended the fifth international Peace Congress at Lausanne. In spite of her associations with the anarchist followers of Bakunin, she was not an anarchist. She was close to many Blanquist refugees, with whom she had collaborated in the Commune, and read the writings of Karl Marx with interest.

In the summer of 1880, a general amnesty allowed Mink to come back to Paris. She helped found the French Workers' Party which was led by Jules Guesde and Paul Lafargue. Guesde was a former anarchist who had converted to Marxism, and the POF was fiercely orthodox. She attended the POF's first congress at Le Havre as a delegate for the workers of Valence. Although, she became unliked and banished from the POF meetings due to her strong and radical feminism. Further, her feminism caused trouble with the French authorities. In 1881 she was imprisoned for her role in a demonstration on behalf of the Russian refugee Jessy Helfman. Since Mink's family had strong connections and citizenship to Russia, the French government threatened to deport her. To avoid this, she married a fellow revolutionary, the mechanic Maxime Négro and had two sons with him: Lucifer-Blanqui-Vercingetorix-Révolution (who was born in 1882 and died in infancy) and Spartacus-Blanqui-Révolution (born in 1884, renamed Maxime by a civil tribunal).

At some point in the 1880s Mink left the POF to join Édouard Vaillant's Blanquist Socialist-Revolutionary Party. However, Marxists and Blanquists collaborated increasingly closely, and in any case Mink seems not to have had a sectarian bent. In later years she again worked as an organizer for the POF, and she contributed to Benoît Malon's non-sectarian journal Révue Socialiste. She also helped found, and contributed to, the feminist journal La Fronde in 1897, with Marguerite Durand and others. In addition to her journalism and political activism, she wrote stories, poems and plays. Two of her plays were performed at the Théâtre Social in 1893. That year, Mink ran unsuccessfully as a candidate in elections for the National Assembly. During the repression of January and February 1894 targeting anarchists, Paule Mink offered to care for Auguste Vaillant's daughter Sidonie following his death sentence. Mink accompanied her along with her adoptive mother, Madame Marchal, so she could ask to visit her father. This request was granted to both the adoptive mother and Vaillant.

Mink was also one of the founders of the feminist organisation 'Women's Solidarity', to which she belonged until 1900. In the late 1890s, she was an outspoken Dreyfusard (a supporter of the Jewish officer who had been wrongly accused of treason).

Mink died on 28 April 1901. Her remains were cremated and buried in Père-Lachaise cemetery. Her funeral was the occasion for a large demonstration of socialists, anarchists and feminists and ended in a violent brawl with the police.

== Sources ==
- McMillan, James F. (2002-01-08). France and Women, 1789-1914: Gender, Society and Politics. Routledge. ISBN 978-1-134-58957-9.
- 'Paule Mink'. Ephemeride Anarchiste.
- 'Paule Mink (1839–1901).' In: Femmes de la Commune.
- 'Mink, Paule (1839–1901).' In: Women in World History: A Biographical Encyclopedia. Farmington Hills, 2002.
