= Ligue Française pour le Droit des Femmes =

The Ligue Française pour le Droit des Femmes (LFDF, French League for Women's Rights) was a women's rights organisation active in France from 1882.

The LFDF was founded by Maria Deraismes, one of the leading feminists in France of the time. Deraismes had previously been active in the Association pour le Droit des Femmes, which she had co-founded with Léon Richer in 1870, but in 1882, Deraismes and Richier differed in regard to the women suffrage issue.

While Richier still maintained the view that women should not be given the vote before they no longer favored the Catholic church so much that women suffrage would result in a backlash of a progressive development of society, Maria Deraismes, who previously shared this view, took the stand that women should be given the vote in order to be more progressive than their present state allowed, rather than the other way around. Deraismes therefore left the Association pour le Droit des Femmes and founded the LFDF.

Eventually, the split resulted in Richiers association being replaced by LFDF as a leading women's movement in France. Deraismes and Richer both arranged several congresses as leaders of their respective associations. After the death of Deraismes in 1894, the LFDF became a leading feminist force in France and issued a strong campaign from women suffrage. It arranged a women's rights congress in 1896 and three in 1900, making resolutions in support of complete equality between the sexes.
