= Michele Koppes =

Glaciologist

- Born: Greece
- Education: University of Washington (Ph.D, MSc) and Williams College (BA with honours)
- Scientific career
- Fields: Glaciology, geomorphology, climate science
- Workplaces: Associate Professor at University of British Columbia's Department of Geography
- Website: blogs.ubc.ca/koppes

Michele Koppes is an associate professor at the University of British Columbia who uses glaciology and geomorphology to study climate and changing landscapes.

== Education ==
Koppes attended Williams College and received a BA in Geology with honors. She continued her education at the University of Washington, earning her Masters of Science in Geological sciences, a Certificate in Environmental Geology and Doctor of Philosophy in Earth and Space Sciences in 2007. At the University of Washington, Koppes worked with advisor Brenard Hallet writing her dissertation on the “Influence of rapid glacial retreat on erosion rates for tide-water glaciers”.

== Career and research ==
Currently, she is an associate professor at the University of British Columbia's Vancouver campus in the department of geography. Koppes studies glaciers and climatology. Through various methods, her and her team are able to quantify the effects of climate change on landscapes and people. Her research is interdisciplinary; bringing together geomorphology, glaciology, climate, and human adaptation and resilience. As of 2017, she also serves on the Executive Board of the Canadian Geomorphology Research Group.

One of Koppes most cited articles is "The relative efficacy of fluvial and glacial erosion over modern to orogenic timescales". She and her co-author, David Montgomery, present that there has been much contention about glaciers or rivers being more effective at eroding. Looking at erosion rates, they have found that both vary significantly; the main driver of erosion is tectonics. In addition, they found that volcanic activity, changes in climate, and agriculture have led to the largest erosion rates.

=== Awards and honors ===
Michele Koppes is a TED senior fellow and Canada Research Chair. As a TED senior fellow, she has written and published the article "Why what's happening in Antarctica won't stay in Antarctica". Discussing the collapse of ice shelves to the lay public, Koppes explains that scientists are not sure when its effects will be felt. Part of the Canadian government program in which "chairholders aim to achieve research excellence", Koppes is a Canada Research Chair in Landscapes of Climate Change, Tier II. Working with TED, she also acted as the educator for the animation Why is Mount Everest so tall? In 2011, she received the Ross Mackay Award from the Canadian Geomorphology Resesarch Group. In 2009, Koppes was nominated by the Association of Polar Early Career Scientists to attend the International Council for Science's Science Visioning Meeting.

=== Publications ===
Koppes has published numerous articles, many funded by grants from the National Science Foundation. Here are some of her most cited articles:

- King, L., Mackenzie, L., Tadaki, M., Macfarlane, K., Cannon, S., Reid, D., and Koppes, M. (2018). Diversity in geoscience: participation, behaviour, and the scientific division of labour at a Canadian geoscience conference. FACETS.
- Beaud, F., Venditti, J., Flowers, G., and Koppes, M. (2018) Excavation of tunnel valleys and inner gorges by seasonally-produced meltwater. Earth Surface Processes and Landforms. doi: 10.1002/esp.4367.
- McDowell, G. and Koppes, M. (2017). Robust adaptation research in high mountains: Integrating the scientific, social, and ecological dimensions of glacio-hydrological change. Water, special issue on Global Warming Impacts on Mountain Glaciers and Communities, 9(10):739. doi: 10.3390/w9100739
- Dufresne, A., Geertsma, M., Shugar, D., Koppes, M., Higman, B., Haeussler, P., Stark, C., Venditti, J. (2017). Sedimentology and geomorphology of a large tsunamigenic landslide, Taan Fiord, Alaska. Sedimentary Geology, special issue on Geohazards. doi.org/10.1016/j.sedgeo.2017.10.004
- Moyer, A.*, Moore, D. and Koppes, M. (2016). Streamflow response to the rapid retreat of a lake-calving glacier. Hydrological Processes, doi: 10.1002/hyp.10890
- Chernos, M*, Koppes, M. and Moore, R.D., (2016). Ablation from calving and surface melt at lake-terminating Bridge Glacier, British Columbia, 1984–2013. The Cryosphere, 10, 87–102. doi:10.5194/tc-10-87-2016.
- Koppes, M., Hallet, B., Rignot, E., Mouginot, J., Wellner, J.S., Boldt, K.B*. (2015). Observed latitudinal variations in erosion as a function of glacier dynamics. Nature 526, 100–103. doi:10.1038/nature15385

== Public engagement ==
As a science policy fellow for US Congress, Koppes worked to help to bring policymakers, media, and the scientific community together. As a legislative consultant on climate change policy, she worked with Congressman Jay Inslee of 1st district Washington State.

=== Education ===
Koppes is a co-founder of Girls on Ice, a program for high school girls about wilderness science, glaciology, ecology, and mountaineering. She also acts as an adviser for a summer exploration and field research program, the Juneau Ice Field Research Program, for high school to graduate students interested in studying glaciology. In addition, she has worked with the Student Conservation Association to help coordinate high school students build and restore trails.

=== Media ===
Acting as a scientific consultant, Koppes has been involved with various media from organizations such as the Discovery Chanel, BBC, and NPR. She has been featured on BBC's documentary Operation Iceberg; as one of five team scientists, Koppes looked to observe and study the formation of icebergs on Greenland's west coast. She also presented about ice tsunami's on BBC's Nature's Weirdest Events series. She's also helped to explain the impacts of climate change on Alaska on Discover Channel's Expedition Alaska. Appearing on Spacepod, she spoke about her research on glaciers and how they are powerful agents of change; mentioning a large landslide triggered by melting glaciers. Along with 11 other women TED fellows, she has been working to change the way that society views women in the scientific community, stating “Doing science properly is rife with failed attempts — on top of this, women must stand up for their legitimate seat at the table. The time has come for both women and men to discard the cultural stereotypes of what a ‘proper scientist’ should be — we can all be curious, creative, brainy, rational, driven, successful, and loving partners and parents, playful and engaged teammates and citizens.”
