= Léonie Rouzade =

French women's rights activist and writer

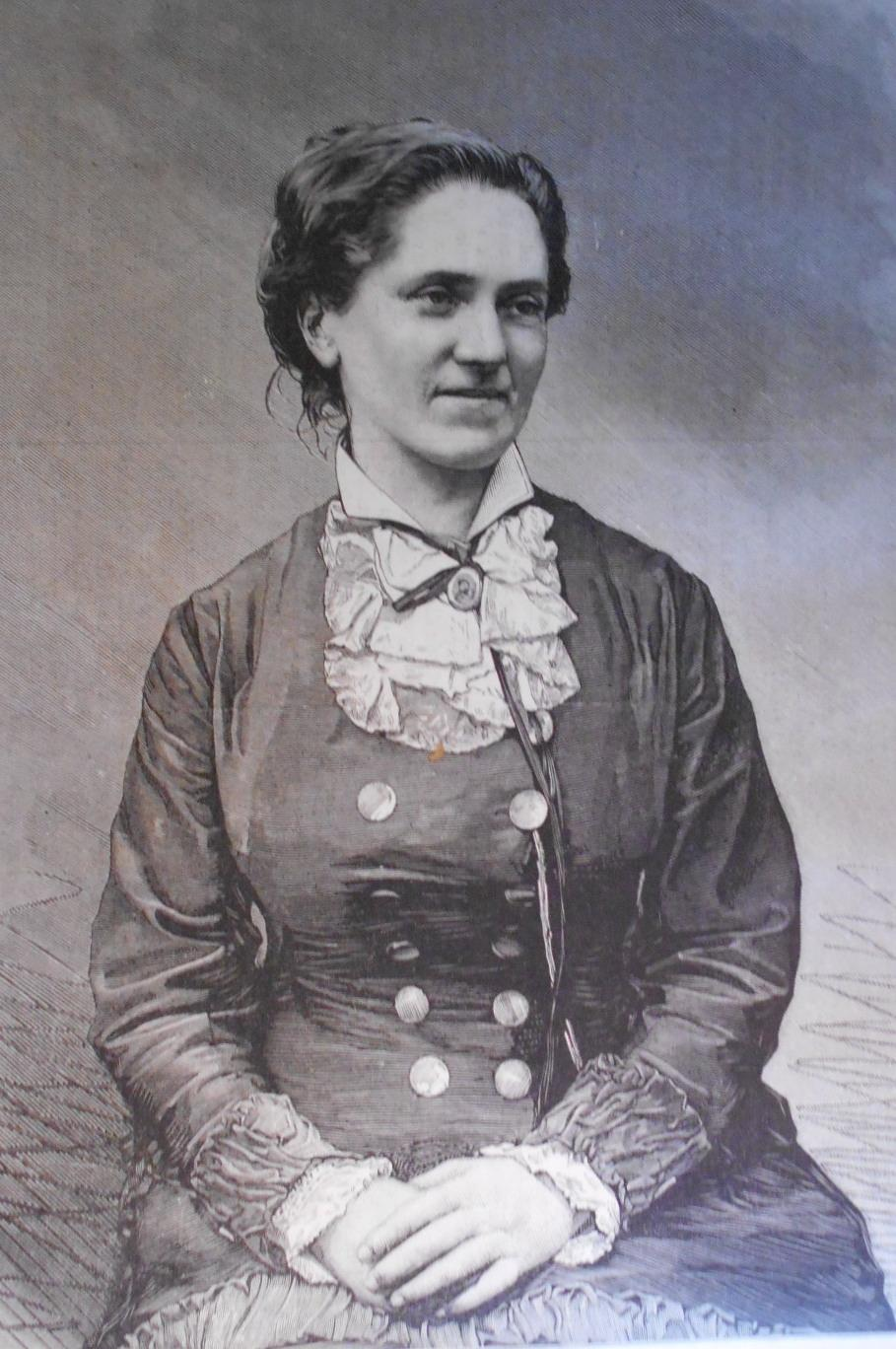
Portrait of Léonie Rouzade, L'Illustration, October 22, 1881

Léonie Rouzade, born Louise-Léonie Camusat (French: [lwiz leɔni kamyza]; 1839–1916) was a French feminist, politician, journalist and author. An active supporter of women's rights, in 1880 together with Eugénie Pierre, she founded the Union des femmes, the first socialist women's association in France. As a writer, in 1872 she published two novels: Le Monde renversé (The World Turned Upside Down) and Voyage de Théodose à l'île de l'Utopie (A Voyage to the Isle of Utopia).

== Biography ==
Born on 6 September 1839 in Paris, Louise-Léonie Camusat was the daughter of a watchmaker. In 1860, after working as an embroiderer, she married Auguste Rouzade, an accountant in Meudon where they settled.

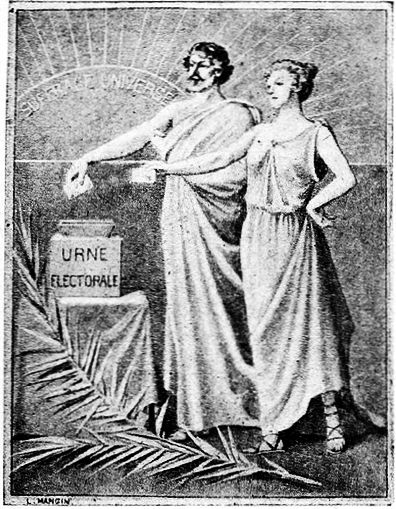
Le vote des femmes

Encouraged by her husband, she spent her spare time promoting the cause of working-class women by writing two feminist novels: Voyage de Théodose à l'île de l'Utopie and Le Monde renversé. In the former, the shipwrecked Théodose discovers an island where everyone works harmoniously for only four hours a day enjoying complete equality between men and women. In the latter, a woman confined to a harem in the Middle East leads a revolt, imposing a new code of law based on men obeying the rule of women.

In 1878, Rouzade participated in the International Congress of Women where she met Hubertine Auclert who encouraged her to support Droit des femmes which she founded the following year. After it was merged with the Parti ouvrier (Workers Party), Rouzade wrote for the journal Le Prolétaire and spoke at party conferences. On 28 February 1880, Le Prolétaire announced that the Union des femmes (UdF) had been established by Léonie Rouzade and Eugénie Pierre. Rouzade spoke at the organization's first meeting on 13 April 1880. That June, she represented the UdF at the Paris region socialist organization Union fédérative du centre and at the 1880 Congès du Havre. She continued to speak at socialist functions until 1882 when she retired from active campaigning after facing strong opposition as a socialist candidate for the 12th Paris arrondissement in the 1881 municipal elections. In 1891, she joined La Solida des femmes founded by Eugénie Potonié-Pierre but left the organization around 1901 after the founder's death.

Léonie Rouzade died in mid-October 1916. The Rue Léonie Rouzade in Meudon is named after her.
