= Richard Koppe =

American artist

Richard Koppe (1916–1973) was an American artist whose work has been exhibited in many museums in America including the MOMA and the Whitney. Koppe was born in St. Paul, Minnesota and moved to Chicago in 1937 to study at the New Bauhaus (which later became the Institute of Design of the Illinois Institute of Technology). In 1950, his work was exhibited at New York's Metropolitan Museum of Art in the exhibition "American Painting Today." He headed the Department of Visual Design at the Institute of Design until 1963. In 2015, 70 of his paintings, prints and drawings were exhibited at the Elmhurst Art Museum. Koppe was married to Catherine Hinkle, also an artist.
