= Virginie Griess-Traut =

French feminist and peace activist (1814–1898)

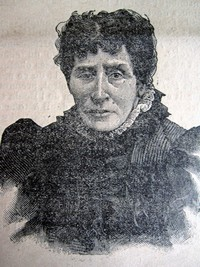
Portrait of Virginie Griess-Traut

Virginie Griess-Traut (1814–1898) was a French feminist, pacifist, and peace activist.

== Life ==
Virginie Traut was born on 18 October 1814 in Colmar, France.

On 7 April 1849, she married Jean Griess, a travelling salesman who shared her interest in phalansterian social organisation (inspired by Fourierist principles of self-sufficiency and cooperation.). Both took the name Griess-Traut. In the same, the couple left France for Algeria, where they remained for twenty-five years. Settling in Algiers, they formed a community with likeminded individuals, setting up a bakery, grocery store, and establishing a Froebelian kindergarten.

At the outset of the Franco-Prussian War in 1870, Griess-Traut took to the press to call on her fellow women to join together in denouncing the war, initiating lifelong involvement with pacifist activism. Over the following decades, Griess-Traut was active in numerous pacifist organisations, including the International League for Peace Freedom, French Society for Arbitration, Society of Peace, and the Association of Women for Peace. She was vice-president of the Society for Peace through Education and an advocate of the idea that 'European forces be made over into groups for public works development', transforming the standing armies of Europe into 'productive organisations'.

In the mid-1870s, Griess-Traut and her husband returned to Europe, living first in Switzerland and then in France. In 1877, Griess-Traut issued a Manifesto of Women Against War. Jean Griess-Traut died in 1882.

In 1889, at the French and International Congress of the Rights of Women in Paris, Griess-Traut spoke in support of co-education. She was also a vice-president of the Congress.

== Death and legacy ==
Griess-Traut died in 1898, and is remembered as being 'a loyal supporter of progressive, republican, feminist, and peace causes during her long life'.

== See also ==
- Pacifism
- Fourierism
