= Léon Richer =

French feminist (1824–1911)

Léon-Pierre Richer
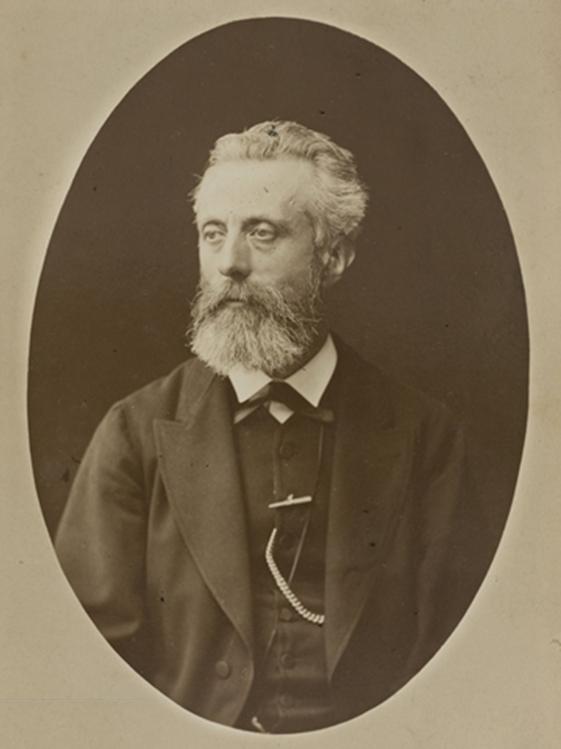
- Léon Richer c. 1875
- Born: March 19, 1824; L'Aigle, Orne, France
- Died: June 25, 1911 (aged 87); Paris, France
- Occupation: Journalist
- Known for: Feminism

Signature
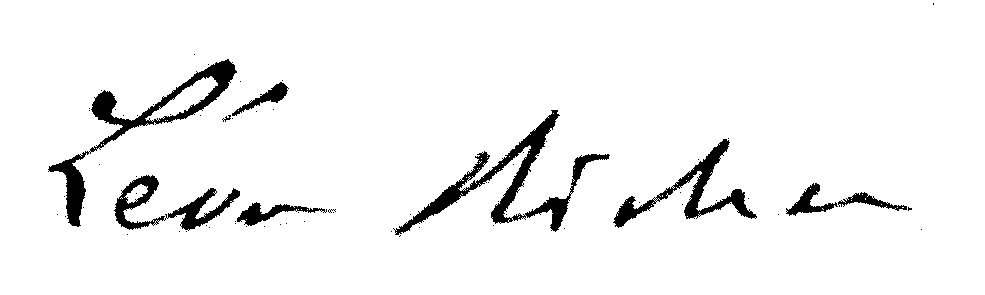

Léon-Pierre Richer (19 March 1824 – 25 June 1911) was a French free-thinker, freemason, journalist and feminist who worked closely with Maria Deraismes during the early years of the feminist movement in Paris. He edited Le Droit des femmes (Women's Rights), a feminist journal that appeared from 1869 to 1891. He was founder of the Ligue française pour le droit des femmes (French League for Women's Rights), one of the main feminist organizations in France in the 1880s. However, Richer was concerned that women were not sufficiently educated in republican principles, and that giving them the vote could cause a clericalist and monarchist reaction and the loss of democracy.

== Early years ==
Léon Richer was born in 1824 in the Orne department. He spent eleven years working for the Orléans Railroads as a notary's clerk, then in the mid-1860s became a journalist. He wrote a column for Le Petit Parisien. Richer published several studies of religious philosophy in the Alliance religieuse universelle and then the Libre Conscience, reviews directed by Henri Carle. From 1866 to 1868 the Opinion nationale published his Lettres d'un libre-penseur à un curé de village (Letters from a Free-Thinker to a Village Priest), which were widely discussed and republished in two volumes. He then published a series of pamphlets along the same line of thought: Le Tocsin, Alerte! and les Propos d'un mécréant. The ultramontanists responded with attacks on the author.

Richer was called a "tranquil and serious man." According to Simone de Beauvoir he was "the true founder of feminism in France." In 1868 political meetings were authorized. Richer arranged and directed a series of Grand-Orient conferences in the rue Cadet in Paris, where he spoke several times. In February 1866 he encouraged Maria Deraismes (1828–94) to participate in these "philosophical conferences". This launched her career as a feminist. Deraismes had inherited a fortune, and decided to avoid marriage so as to retain her freedom.

Richer founded Le Droit des femmes (Women's Rights), a journal that appeared from 1869 to 1891. (Note: In September 1871 Richer renamed his journal to the less assertive L'Avenir des Femmes (Women's future). After the 1878 conference Richer reverted to the original title of Le Droit des femmes.) The purpose of the weekly newspaper was to campaign for reform of women's legal rights. Demands included establishment of a family council that would help women whose husbands or fathers were abusive, better education for girls, higher wages for women to reduce the need for prostitution, equal wages for equal work, admission of qualified women to the professions, women's control of property and wealth and revisions to the Civil Code. The paper did not demand women's suffrage, which Richer always claimed to support but always in practice found reasons to oppose. Richer edited the paper and wrote most of the content. Desraismes helped fund the paper, to which she contributed. She and Richer founded the ''Societé pour l'amélioration du sort de la femme (Society for the Amelioration of Women's Condition), which held the first feminist banquet on 11 July 1870.

== French Third Republic ==
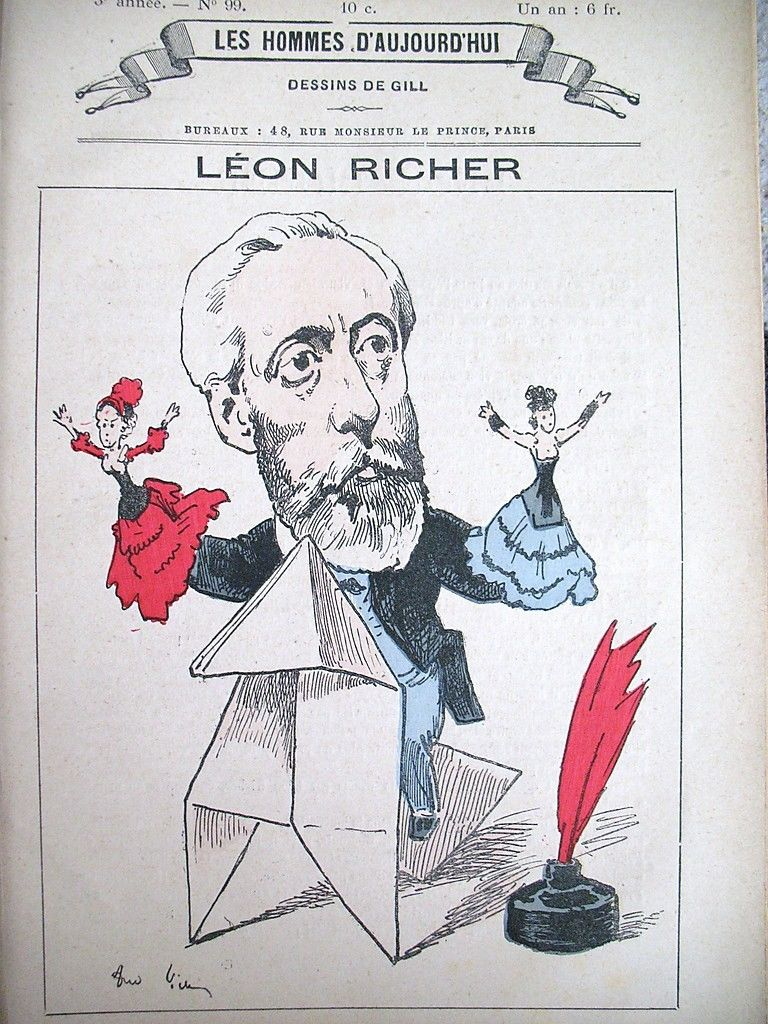
Léon Richer by André Gill in Les Hommes d'aujourd'hui

The French Third Republic was born on 4 September 1870 after the Second French Empire collapsed during the Franco-Prussian War. (Note: Desraismes supported the republic from the right. During the 1881 and 1885 elections she let her country estate at Pontoise be used for committee rooms for the republicans, and her salon in Paris as the headquarters for resistance to Boulangism.) After the war ended the country was divided between liberal republicans and conservative monarchists, but both groups united in opposing the loose morals of the former imperial court, and women's rights were associated with immorality. The feminists resumed their activities, but kept a low profile. In the mid-1870s Eugénie Potonié-Pierre joined the Society for the Amelioration of Women's Condition and became secretary of Le Droit des femmes and a regular contributor to the journal. Desraismes and Richer organized a Women's Rights conference in July–August 1878. The organizing committee included representatives from France, Switzerland, Italy, the Netherlands, Russia and America. The congress discussed history, education, economics, morality and law.

Hubertine Auclert tried to bring up the subject of women's suffrage at the 1878 conference, but this was rejected as premature and Auclert broke away. The majority of feminists stayed with Desraismes and Richer. Richer and Deraismes advocated the pragmatic strategy of la brèche (the breach) and opposed Auclert's confrontational strategy of l'assaut (the assault). The first priority was to consolidate the secular Republic, and women's political rights came second to this goal. The alliance with the republicans had positive results. After the republicans won control of the National Assembly in 1879 Richer wrote the divorce bill that Alfred Joseph Naquet introduced in the Chamber of Deputies.

In October 1882 Deraismes spoke in favor of Women's suffrage, which Auclert noted as a great advance. Richer did not agree. (Note: One writer suggests that the falling out between Deraismes and Richer may have been more to do with personality conflicts than ideology. Both had large egos.) He became inactive in the Amélioration society, and in November 1882 founded the Ligue Française pour le Droit des Femmes (French League for Women's Rights). The December 1882 issue of Le Droit des Femmes published the names of the sixty-six founding members. The Ligue held its first general assembly in January 1883. Victor Hugo was appointed honorary president and Deraismes and Auguste Vacquerie, chief editor of Rappel, were honorary vice-presidents. Richer thought that changes to the law could best be achieved through collaboration with politicians. By the end of 1883 194 members had joined the Ligue, of whom almost half were men, including politicians and writers. In subsequent years membership declined, and after ten years there were only 95 members. Le Droit des Femmes became increasingly dependent on subsidies from the Ligue, and often came close to bankruptcy.

In 1883 Richer published Le Code des Femmes (1883), which defined the most urgent reforms, and those that would be easiest to achieve at once. Richer's list did not include women's suffrage. Richer took an anti-clerical line, writing, "it is enough for us to have to struggle against reactionaries of the masculine sex without giving to these partisans of defeated regimes the support of millions of female ballots subject to the occult domination of the priest, their confessor." In 1885 Richer declared that the radical feminists "gravely compromise the cause that they claim to defend", while reasserting his support for women's suffrage:

Yes, woman should possess the vote. She is human; she has her own interests; she is in business, industry and [subject to] licensing; she participates in the maintenance of the State; she pays, like us, direct and indirect taxes, that is to say the personal assessment, the real estate levy, the tax on bread, meat and drinks; she is judged in our courts; she pays her blood – the blood of her son (is not this blood hers?) – on battlefields; she shares our miseries, as she would share our triumphs and joys. All that we touch touches her. Her exclusion from common rights is not only a denial of justice, an act of individual oppression, it is a social crime.

On the other hand, Richer was concerned that women were not yet sufficiently educated in republican principles. He wrote in Le Droit des Femmes on 20 May 1888, "I believe that at the present time, it would be dangerous – in France – to give women the political ballot. They are, in great majority, reactionaries and clericals. If they voted today, the Republic would not last six months."

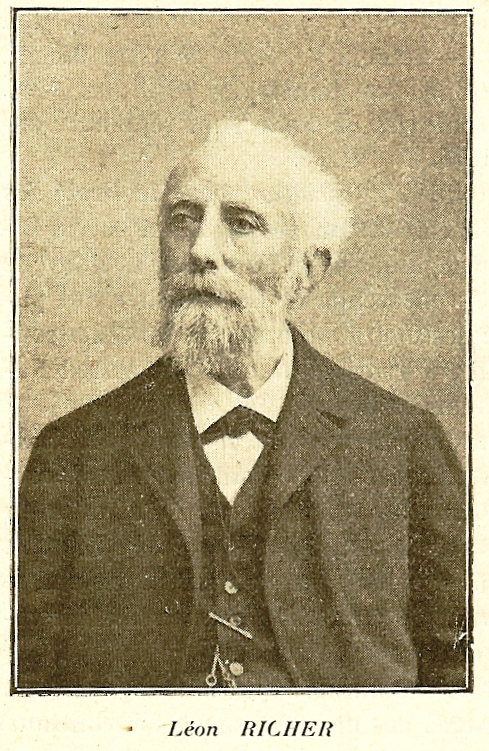
Richer in later years

In 1889 the French government sponsored a "woman's congress" presided over by Jules Simon, which celebrated the role of women in society, and their charitable activities in particular. Feminists led by Léon Richer and Maria Deraismes organized an alternative Congrès Francais et International du Droit des Femmes, held in Paris 25–29 June 1889. Richer and Deraismes had drifted apart during the 1880s, but agreed to cooperate on this conference. The conference was held during the Exposition Universelle of 1878. Emilie de Morsier was one of the organizers of the government congress, but also attended the feminist congress and donated money to help support it. By this time Richer, Deraismes and Auclert were no longer addressing the needs of poor working women, as were the socialists. Their "republican feminism" essentially represented the needs and wants of middle-class women.

In December 1891 Le Droit des Femmes was suspended and Richer retired from the feminist movement. He was disappointed, aging and in poor health. He was the last of the leading male feminists, and left an organization increasingly dominated by women. He was honored by the Ligue in 1902 with a four franc banquet. Léon Richer died at the age of eighty-seven on 25 June 1911.

== Publications ==
- Richer, Léon; Guéroult, Adolphe (1868). Lettres d'un Libre-Penseur à un Curé de Village,... précédées d'une introduction par A. Guéroult. Armand le Chevalier.
- Richer, Léon (1868). Le tocsin. Madre.
- Richer, Léon (1868). Alerte ! par Léon Richer,... A. Panis.
- Richer, Léon (1868). Propos d'un Mécréant: par Léon Richer,... Paris: Panis.
- Richer, Léon (1872). Le livre des femmes. Bibliothèque Démocratique.
- Richer, Léon (1874). Lettres parisiennes: la politique en 1873. Librairie de la Société des gens de lettres.
- Richer, Léon (1874). Le divorce: projet de loi précédé d'un exposé des motifs et suivi des principaux documents officiels se rattachant a la question. Le Chevalier.
- Richer, Léon (1876). Un mariage honteux, par Léon Richer. E. Dentu.
- Richer, Léon (1877). La femme libre. E. Dentu.
- Richer, Léon (1879). Le droit des femmes.
- Richer, Léon (1883). Le code des femmes. E. Dentu.

== Sources ==
- "1878 Women's Rights Conference". International Museum of Women. Archived from the original on 2016-03-04.
- Bidelman, Patrick Kay (Summer 1976). "The Politics of French Feminism: Léon Richer and the Ligue Française pour le Droit des Femmes, 1882-1891". Historical Reflections / Réflexions Historiques. 3 (1). Berghahn Books: 93–120. JSTOR 41298677.
- Gildea, Robert (2008). Children of the Revolution: The French, 1799-1914. Harvard University Press. ISBN 978-0-674-03209-5.
- Mayeur, Jean-Marie; Rebirioux, Madeleine (1988-01-29). The Third Republic from Its Origins to the Great War, 1871-1914. Cambridge University Press. ISBN 978-0-521-35857-6.
- McMillan, James F. (2002-01-08). France and Women, 1789-1914: Gender, Society and Politics. Routledge. p. 130. ISBN 978-1-134-58957-9.
- Moses, Claire Goldberg (1984). French Feminism in the 19th Century. SUNY Press. ISBN 978-0-87395-859-2.
- Commire, Anne, ed. (1999). "Potonié-Pierre, Eugénie (1844–1898)". Women in World History: A Biographical Encyclopedia. Waterford, CT: Yorkin Publications, Gale Group. ISBN 0787640808.
- Poupin, Victor (1872). "Léon Richer". Le livre des femmes by Léon Richer (in French). Paris: Bibliothèque Démocratique.
- Stanton, Elizabeth Cady (2006-07-18). The Selected Papers of Elizabeth Cady Stanton and Susan B. Anthony: When clowns make laws for queens 1880 to 1887. Rutgers University Press. ISBN 978-0-8135-2320-0.
- Stanton, Theodore (1884). The woman question in Europe: a series of original essays. G. P. Putnam's sons. p. 248.
