= Nicholas Camusat =

French historian

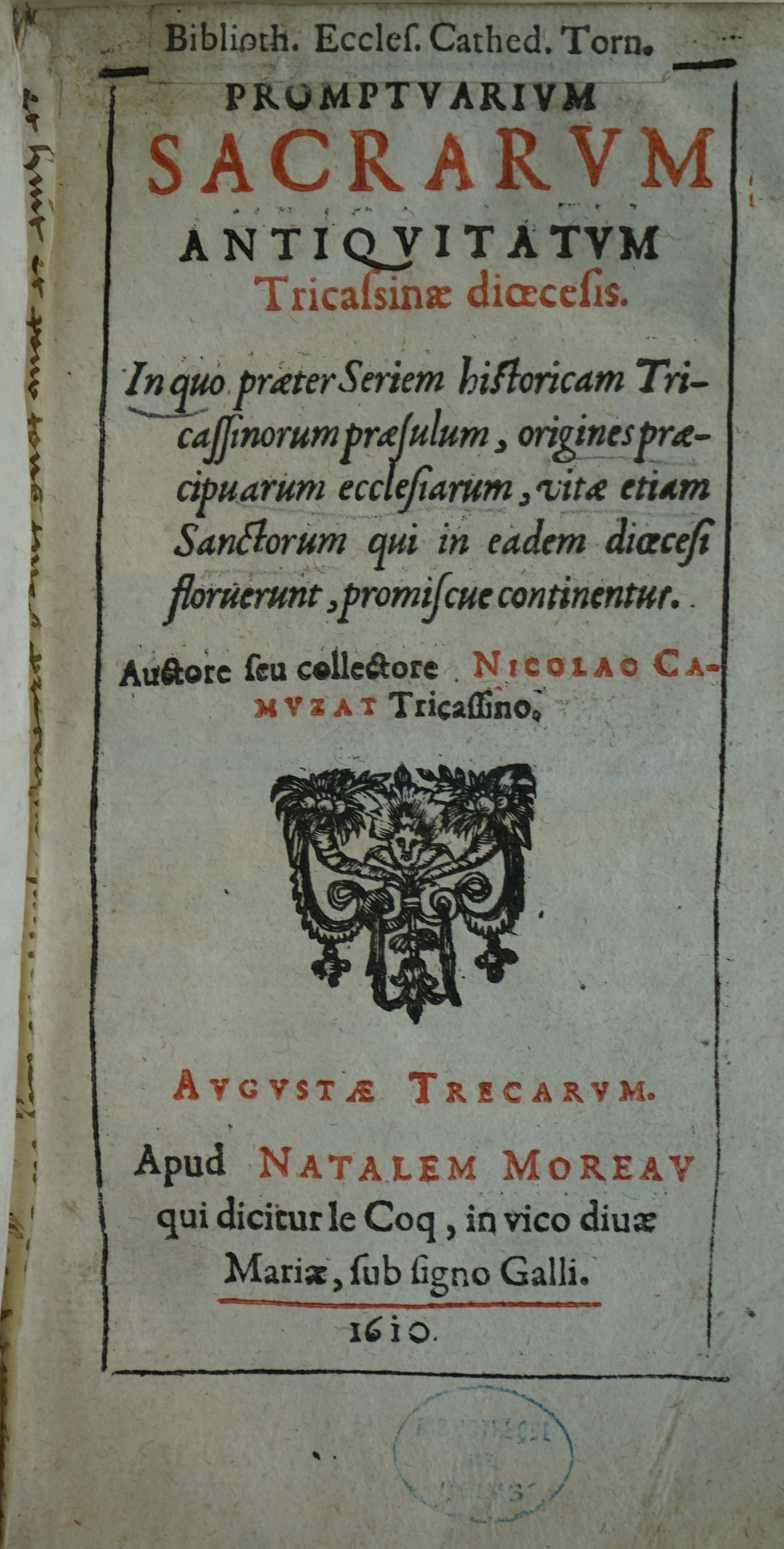
Promptuarium sacrarum

Nicholas Camusat (French: [nikɔla kamyza]; 1575–1655) was a French historian, born in Troyes, then part of the province of Champagne. His works are:

1. Chronologia ab origine orbis, usque ad ann. 1200. 4to.
2. Promptuarium sacrarum antiquitatum Tricassinae diocesis, 1610, 8vo.
3. Historia Albigensium, 1615.
4. Meslanges Historiques, 1619, 8vo.

Francis Camusat, another historian, was his great-nephew.
