= Louise Koppe =

19th-century French feminist writer and journalist

Louise Koppe, officially Catherine Laurence Koppe, was a 19th-century French feminist writer and journalist, and the founder of France's first maternity home. She was born on May 4, 1846 in the former 4th arrondissement of Paris and died on May 31, 1900 in the 19th arrondissement of Paris.

== Biography ==
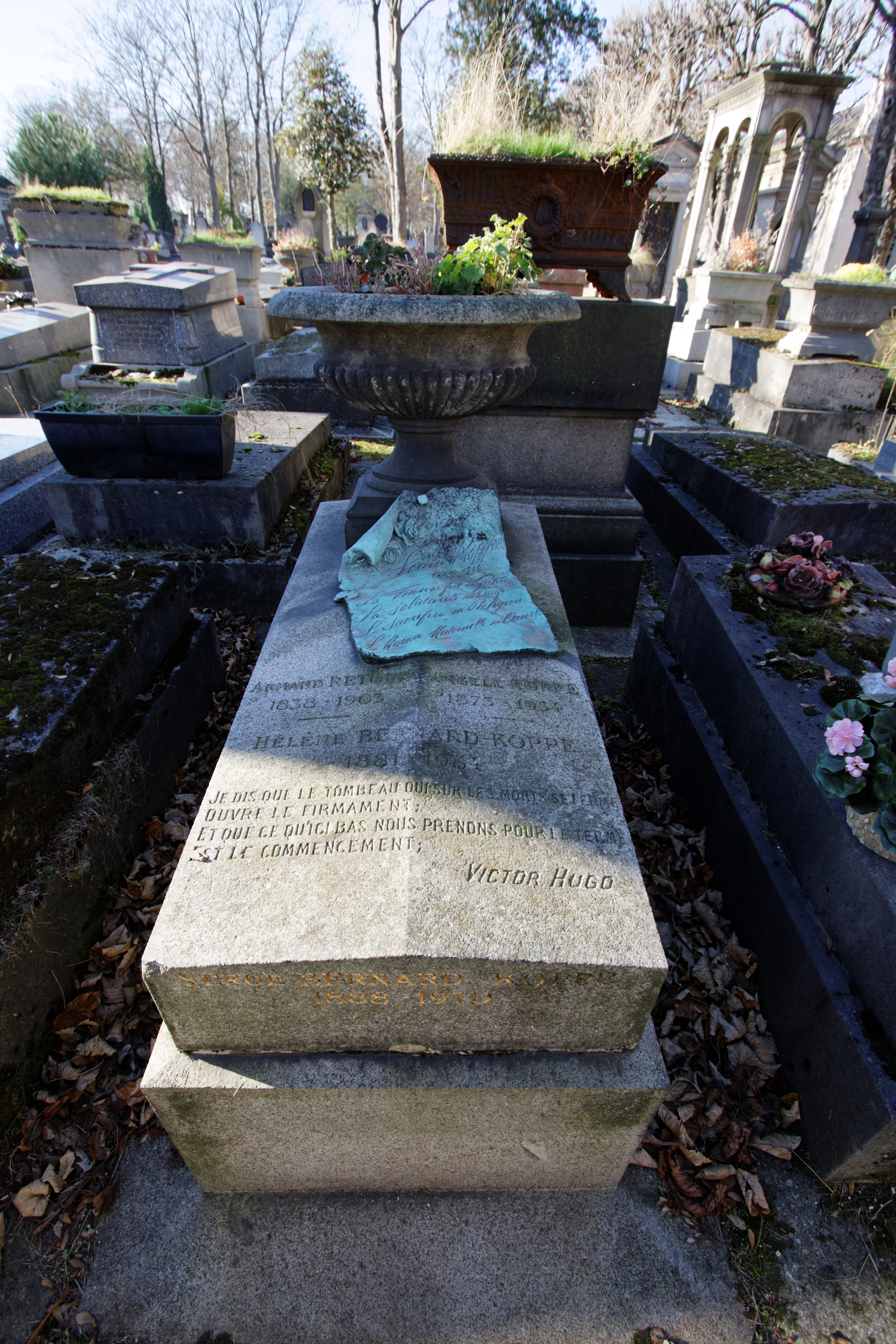
Koppe's grave at Père Lachaise Cemetery, Paris (Division 90)

Koppe was born into a modest family. Her father was a tailor and her mother died when Koppe was aged 8. Koppe was raised in a boarding school in the Oise department. At the age of 18, she married Louis Armand Rétoux, with whom she had five children. She experienced the 1871 Paris Commune at the age of 20 and met author Victor Hugo and discovered his literature with emotion, which certainly influenced her social commitment.

In 1894, Koppe joined the Masonic lodge Le Droit Humain that was founded in 1893. She was one of the first feminist members of the lodge.

In 1878, she took part to the International Congress of Women's Rights in Paris. She enjoyed writing and founded several newspapers in which her poems, articles and theater plays were published. Maternity is a recurring theme in Koppe's work. In 1879, she founded the newspaper La Femme de France that became La Femme dans la famille et dans la société and then La Femme et l'enfant in 1882.

Louise Koppe died in May 1900. Her three daughters Angèle, Mathilde and Hélène-Victoria kept developing her work.

== Maternity home ==
In 1891, Koppe founded the first maternity home on Avenue René-Coty in Paris, to host children of mothers in distress.

In 1930, a silent short film was shot by anonymous Gaumont employees to present the home.

== Published works ==
- La Femme de France : journal littéraire et scientifique; Louise Koppe (ed.), 1st year, n°1 (2 August 1879) - n°11 (11 October 1879)
- La Femme dans la famille et dans la société, 1st-3rd years, 1880–82, Paris
