= Maria Vérone =

French feminist and suffragist

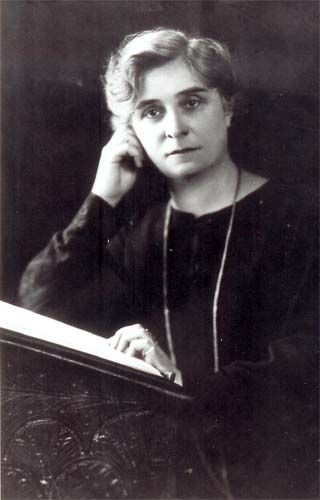
- Maria Verone
- Born: 20 June 1874; Paris, France
- Died: 4 May 1938 (aged 63); Paris, France
- Education: Faculty of Law (Sorbonne)
- Occupations: Journalist, Attorney, Suffragist

Maria Vérone (1874–1938) was a French feminist and suffragist. A free-thinker, she was the president of the Ligue Française pour le Droit des Femmes (French League for Women's Rights) or LFDF, from 1919 to 1938.

== Life ==
Vérone was born on June 20, 1874, in Paris, France. She served as secretary at the International Congress of Freethinkers when she was 15 years old. She initially supported herself as a teacher, but was dismissed for her political opinions and unionizing activities.

On December 7, 1903, she pleaded before the War Council, defending two reservists prosecuted for insubordination and, on December 31, became the first woman to plead before the appeals court in Paris, Marguerite Dilhan having first pled in the appeals court of Toulouse in 1903.

Vérone became a reporter for the French feminist newspaper La Fronde, which was published by Marguerite Durand. Her journalism on legal and judicial matters led to her interest in becoming a lawyer. In 1907 Vérone, a single mother of two, was admitted to the French bar.

Vérone served as president of Ligue Française pour le Droit des Femmes for 20 years.

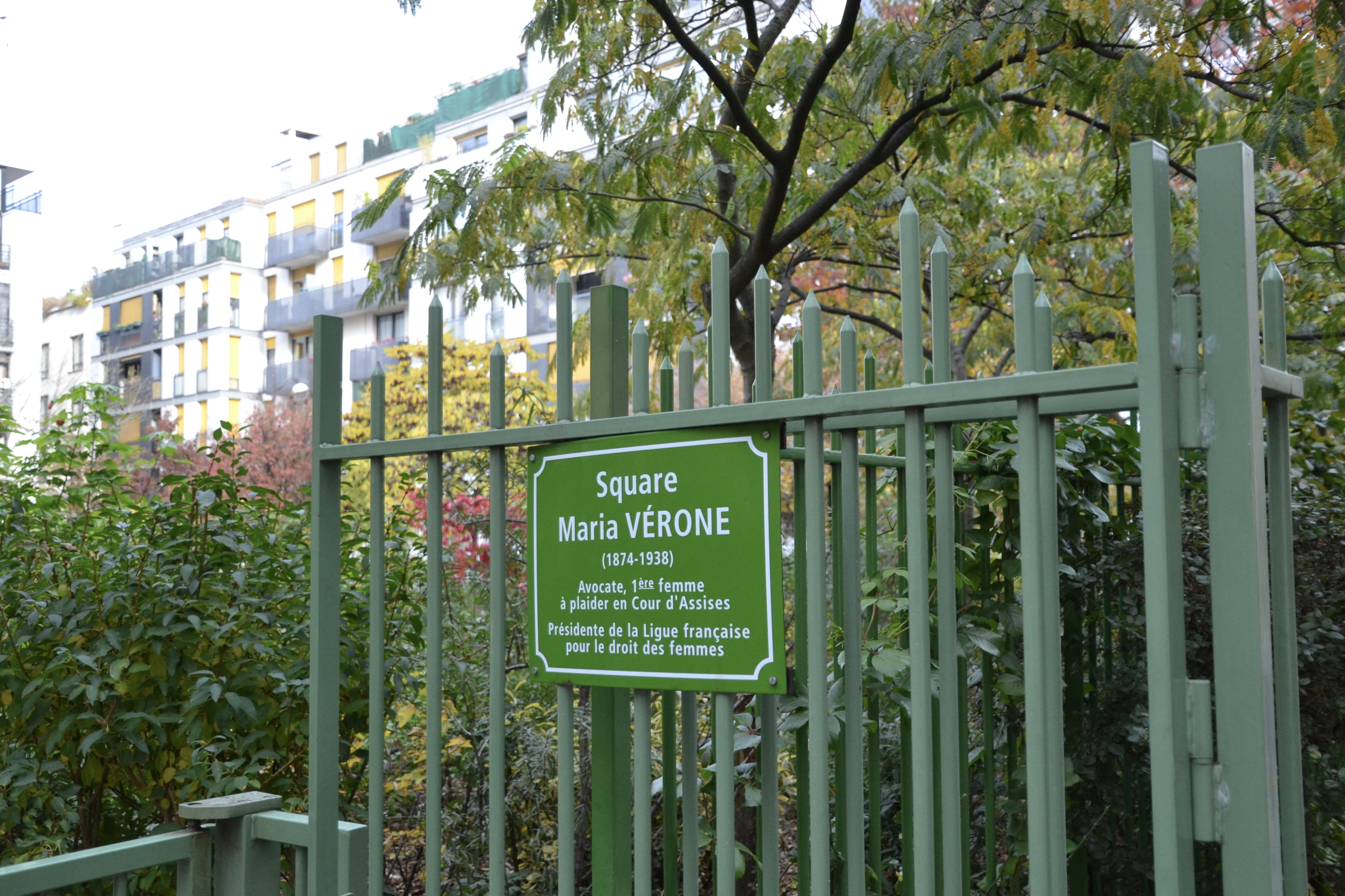
Square Maria Vérone, Paris

Vérone died on May 24, 1938, in Paris.

== See also ==
- First women lawyers around the world
- List of suffragists and suffragettes

== Sources ==
=== Bibliography ===
- Christine Bard. Les filles de Marianne : histoire des féminismes 1914–1940. Paris : Fayard, 1995. ISBN 2213593906
- Laurence Klejman and Florence Rochefort. « Vérone (Maria), 1874–1938 », Dictionnaire des intellectuals français, Jacques Juillard and Michel Winock, ed. Paris : Seuil, 1996.
- Raymond Hesse & Lionel Nastorg, Leur manière...: plaidoiries à la façon de... Raymond Poincaré, Maria Vérone, etc., B. Grasset, Paris, 1925, 212 p.
- Sara L. Kimble, « No Right to Judge : Feminism and the Judiciary in Third Republic France. » French Historical Studies 31, no. 4 (2008): 609–641. https://www.academia.edu/307609 https://depaul.academia.edu/SaraKimble
- Sara L. Kimble, « Popular Legal Journalism in the Writings of Maria Vérone. » PWSFH Volume 39, 2011 http://hdl.handle.net/2027/spo.0642292.0039.021
- Juliette Rennes, Le mérite et la nature : une controverse républicaine, l'accès des femmes aux professions de prestige, 1880–1940, Fayard, 2007, 594 p. ISBN 9782213631615

=== External links ===
- Maria Vérone : « Pourquoi les femmes veulent voter » (conférence du 24 avril 1914, avec une courte biographie)
- Square Maria Vérone (délibération du Conseil Municipal du 18ème arrondissement de Paris en janvier 2010)
