= Eugénie Potonié-Pierre =

French feminist (1844–1898)

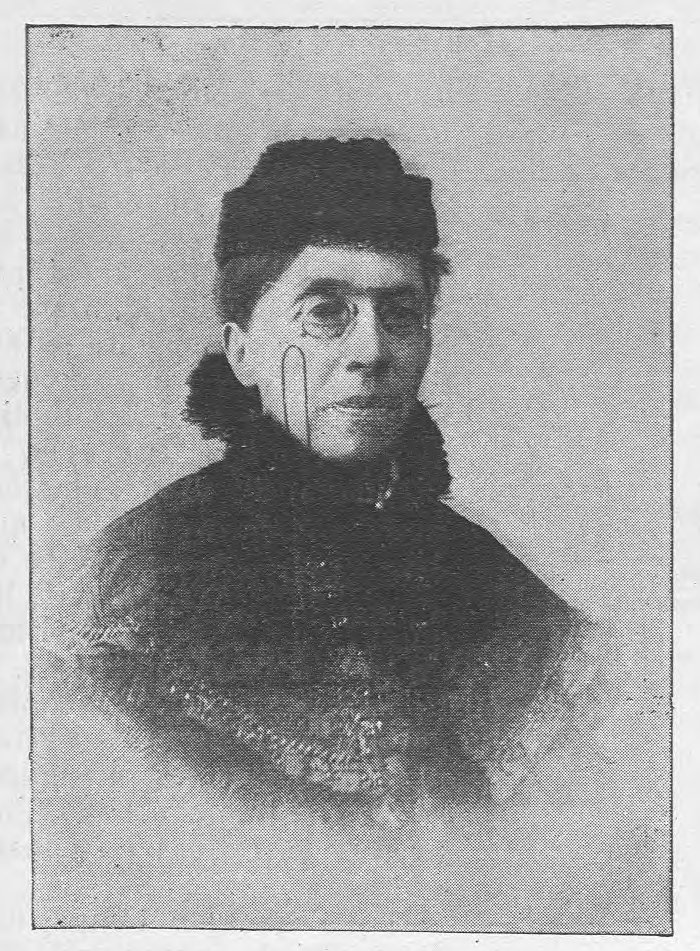
- Eugénie Potonié-Pierre in 1896
- Born: Eugénie Pierre; 5 November 1844; Lorient, France
- Died: 12 June 1898 (aged 53); Fontenay-sous-Bois, France
- Occupation: Feminist activist
- Known for: Founding the Fédération française des sociétés féministes; coining the term féminisme
- Spouse: Edmond Potonié-Pierre
- Father: Guillaume Pierre

Eugénie Potonié-Pierre (5 November 1844 – 12 June 1898) was a French feminist activist who founded the Fédération française des sociétés féministes (French Federation of Feminist Societies) in 1892. She is credited with helping to popularize the term féminisme and played a key role in bridging French feminism with the socialist and labor movements of the late 19th century.

== Early life and family ==
Eugénie Pierre was born in Lorient, France, the daughter of Guillaume Pierre, a professor of philosophy and a follower of the social theorist Charles Fourier. Her father's Fourierist beliefs, which emphasized the liberation of women as part of social transformation, influenced her later activism.

In 1881, she married Edmond Potonié-Pierre, a Saint-Simonian and pacifist who founded the Ligue universelle du bien public (Universal League for the Public Good). The couple jointly signed their writings, which included novels and essays.

== Activism ==
=== Early work ===
In the 1870s, Potonié-Pierre joined the Société pour l'amélioration de la condition des femmes (Society for the Amelioration of Women's Condition), alongside Léon Richer and Maria Deraismes. She served as the organization's secretary and wrote for its publication, Le Droit des femmes (Women's Rights).

In 1880, together with Léonie Rouzade, she founded the Union des femmes (Women's Union), a socialist feminist group. The group's first public meeting was attended by the socialist leader Jules Guesde.

=== Federation of Feminist Societies ===
In 1891, seeking to bridge the gap between feminism and the workers' movement, Potonié-Pierre founded the Solidarité des femmes (Women's Solidarity). She called for feminist groups to unite under a single federation. The resulting Fédération française des sociétés féministes was established at the beginning of 1892, bringing together eight feminist organizations.

The Federation organized the first international feminist congress in Paris from 13–15 May 1892, which brought together social feminists, mainstream feminists, and socialists. While the congress did not produce concrete proposals, it marked an early attempt to create a unified feminist movement in France.

A second international feminist congress followed in 1896, organized jointly by Solidarité des femmes and the Ligue française pour le droit des femmes (French League for Women's Rights).

=== Coining of "féminisme" ===
Potonié-Pierre served as secretary of the committee for the International Congress for Women's Rights in 1892 and 1896. In her speech to the International Congress of 1896 in Berlin, Potonié-Pierre credited herself and her French feminist colleagues with coining the term féminisme. The term was officially adopted at her proposal during the first Paris congress as early as 1892.

== Death and burial ==
Potonié-Pierre died suddenly on 12 June 1898 in Fontenay-sous-Bois from a cerebral hemorrhage at the age of 54. Her ashes were placed in the columbarium of Père Lachaise Cemetery (case no. 755).

== Legacy ==
Potonié-Pierre is remembered as a bridge figure between bourgeois feminism and the socialist workers' movement in late 19th-century France. Her efforts to create a unified feminist federation anticipated later coalitions, and her role in popularizing the term féminisme contributed to the global feminist vocabulary.

== See also ==
- Maria Deraismes
- Léonie Rouzade
- Aline Valette
- Feminism in France
