= Maria Deraismes =

French writer and feminist (1828–1894)

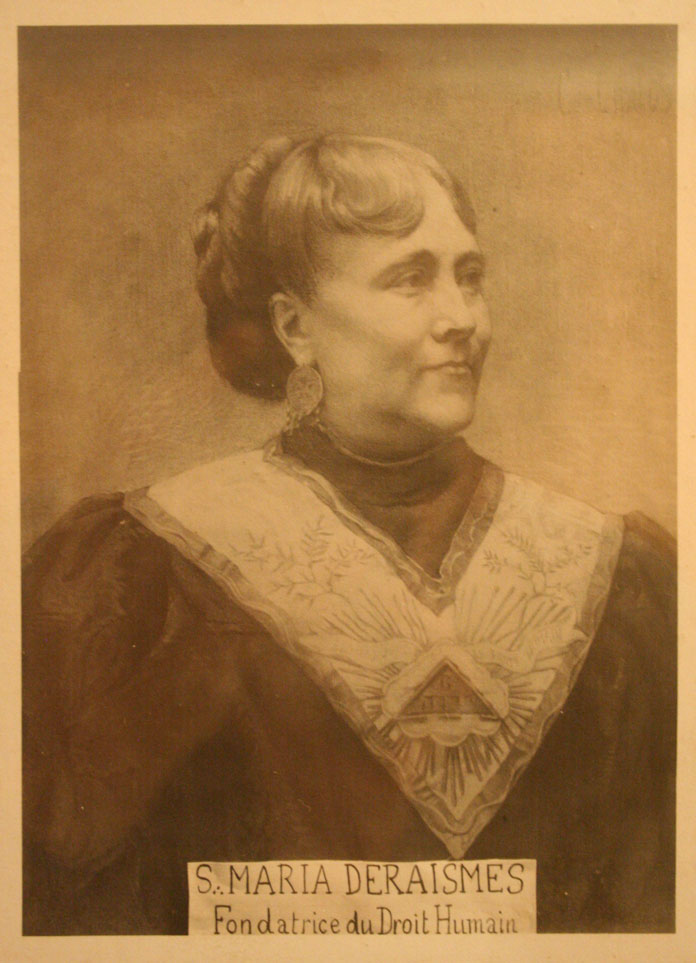
- Born: Marie Adélaïde Deraismes; 17 August 1828; Paris, France
- Died: 6 February 1894 (aged 65); Paris, France
- Occupations: Writer, Suffragist
- Relatives: Anna Féresse-Deraismes (sister)
- Writing career
- Years active: Paris, France

Maria Deraismes (born Marie Adélaïde Deraismes; 17 August 1828 – 6 February 1894) was a French author, feminist orator, and Freemason. She was the first woman initiated into Freemasonry in France and co-founded Le Droit Humain, the first mixed-gender Masonic order. A pioneering force for women's rights, she worked alongside Léon Richer, Hubertine Auclert, and Elizabeth Cady Stanton to advance the cause of women's civil and political equality.

== Early life ==
Maria Deraismes was born in Paris on 17 August 1828. She grew up in Pontoise, in the city's northwest outskirts, in a prosperous middle-class family. Her father, a merchandise commissioner, was a Voltairean anticlerical, and her mother was the heiress to an uncle who had developed lighthouse lenses. Deraismes was largely self-taught, learning to read alongside her older sister Anna. She familiarized herself with Greek and Latin classics, Enlightenment writers, the Church Fathers, Eastern religions, the sacred books of India, and German philosophers.

At age twelve, she was already giving speeches from the family garden's bandstand and writing pamphlets and plays that were presented in bourgeois salons. She initially aspired to become a painter, following the example of Rosa Bonheur. She studied with a student of history painter Paul Delaroche and later, after her family moved to Nice, with the court painter of the King of Piedmont. After her father's death in 1852, she returned to Paris and enrolled in Léon Cogniet's workshop for women before turning to writing.

After her mother's death in 1862 and her sister's widowhood in 1865, Maria and Anna lived together at the family home, where they hosted a salon frequented by figures of liberal democracy.

== Feminist activism ==
In 1866, Deraismes was persuaded to join a feminist group called the Société pour la Revendication du Droit des Femmes (Society for the Claim of Women's Rights), which met at the home of André Léo. Members included Paule Minck, Louise Michel, Eliska Vincent, Élie Reclus and his wife Noémie, Mme Jules Simon, and Caroline de Barrau. Because of the broad range of opinions, the group decided to focus on improving girls' education.

That same year, Deraismes accepted an invitation from Léon Richer to speak at a lodge of the Grand Orient de France in response to Jules Barbey d'Aurevilly's misogynistic article "Les bas-bleus" (The Bluestockings). Her lecture on morality was a success, launching her career as a public speaker.

In 1869, Deraismes co-founded the Société pour la revendication des droits civils des femmes (Society for the Claim of Women's Civil Rights) with Paule Minck, Louise Michel, and Léon Richer. In 1870, she and Richer founded L'Association pour le droit des femmes (Association for Women's Rights), which she presided over. She helped fund Richer's newspaper Le Droit des femmes (Women's Rights), which became L'Avenir des femmes (The Future of Women) in 1870.

Following the ouster of Napoleon III and the establishment of the Third Republic, Deraismes understood that a more moderate approach was necessary for feminism to survive and avoid being marginalized by the new male power brokers of the era. While she supported the Republic, she recognized the contradiction of fighting alongside republican men who were often reluctant to advance women's emancipation.

In 1874, with Virginie Griess-Traut (a Fourierist, pacifist, and feminist), Aline Valette (a socialist feminist), and Hubertine Auclert (a suffragist), she created the Société pour l'amélioration du sort de la femme (Society for the Improvement of Women's Condition).

In 1878, she co-organized with Léon Richer the International Congress of Women's Rights, which addressed five main themes: history, education, economics, morality, and legislation. In 1881, she organized the first Anticlerical Congress at the Grand Orient de France and became director of the newspaper Le Républicain de Seine-et-Oise—a position the 1881 law had newly made available to women.

With support from suffragists such as Hubertine Auclert, Deraismes worked to achieve political emancipation for women. She stood as a symbolic candidate in the elections of 1885. She believed in the importance of women's suffrage but felt that demanding the vote too early, given the likely defeat, would damage the broader cause of women's rights.

Deraismes also campaigned for the abolition of state-regulated prostitution alongside English feminist Josephine Butler. She viewed regulated prostitution as a manifestation of male oppression and the antagonism between men and women.

Her work brought her international recognition. She met American activist Elizabeth Cady Stanton in Paris in 1882 and became an influence upon Stanton's thinking. She received support from prominent figures including Louis Blanc, Victor Schœlcher, and Victor Hugo.

== Freemasonry ==
=== Initiation ===
Facing successive refusals from Masonic obediences to admit women, the Lodge "Les Libres Penseurs" (The Free Thinkers) in Le Pecq, a small village west of Paris, decided to resist. With the active complicity of Dr. Georges Martin, Maria Deraismes was initiated into Freemasonry on 14 January 1882—the first woman initiated in France, using the same ritual as male initiates.

Maria Deraismes was initiated into Freemasonry on 14 January 1882, when it was still rare for a woman to be admitted into that Fraternity. She joined "Les Libres Penseurs" Lodge, of Pecq, a small village to the west of Paris. This initiation caused considerable upheaval in French Freemasonry. The lodge was suspended from its obedience, the Grande Loge Symbolique Écossaise (Scottish Symbolic Grand Lodge), until Deraismes distanced herself from the lodge's work. Negotiations took place with the rebellious brothers, and five months later, the Pecq lodge submitted a membership list to the GLSE from which Deraismes's name was omitted. The incident was closed, and the lodge was reinstated.

Maria Deraismes was initiated into Freemasonry on 14 January 1882, when it was still rare for a woman to be admitted into that Fraternity. A year later, she and Georges Martin organized a Masonic lodge that allowed both men and women as members. From this co-masonic Lodge developed the Grande Loge Symbolique Ecossaise "Le Droit Humain", which grew into the International Order of Freemasonry Le Droit Humain.

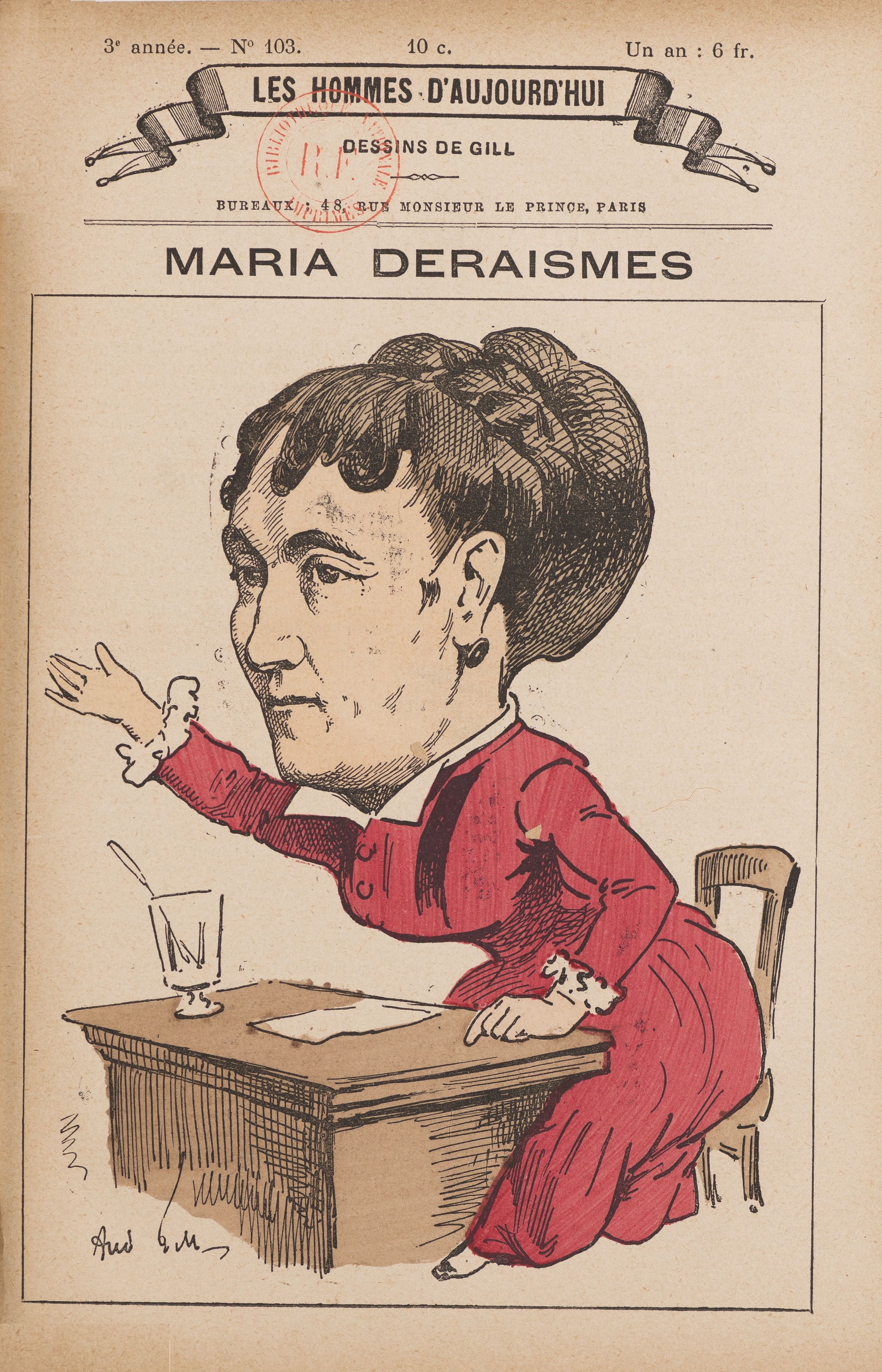
Caricature of Maria Deraismes

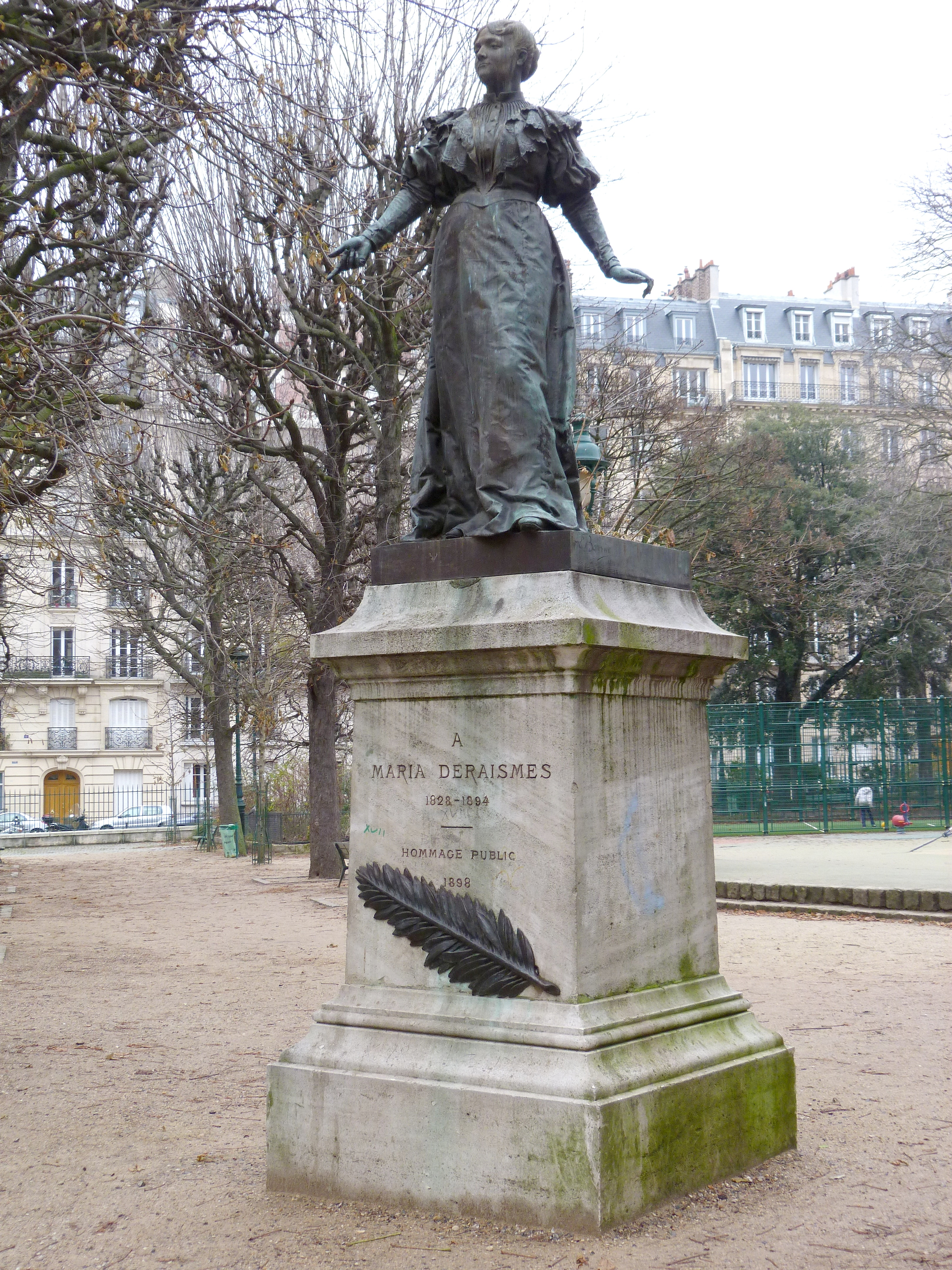
The bronze statue (1898) of Deraismes by Louis-Ernest Barrias. It was melted down in 1942 on German orders. It was recast in 1983 from the surviving plaster cast and re-erected.

=== Founding of Le Droit Humain ===
Eleven years after her initiation, on 4 April 1893, Deraismes gathered sixteen women from the republican bourgeoisie at her home. Assisted by Georges Martin, she conferred upon them the first symbolic degree of "Apprentice Mason." The first mixed-gender Masonic lodge was thus created in Paris.

Through its title Le Droit Humain (The Human Right), the lodge proclaimed its desire that all people, men and women, be entitled to equal benefit from social justice, education, and equality. This lodge became the Grande Loge Symbolique Écossaise Mixte "Le Droit Humain," which grew into the International Order of Freemasonry for Men and Women, Le Droit Humain—the fifth Masonic obedience in France.

Deraismes did not live to see the Order's full development. Following her death, the task of organizing and expanding Le Droit Humain fell to Dr. Georges Martin. Shortly before her death, she left the message: "I leave you the Temple unfinished; continue, between its Columns, the Right of Humanity."

=== Masonic philosophy ===
As a freethinker and anticlerical, Deraismes joined Freemasonry to combat what she saw as the Catholic Church's obscurantism and misogyny. In a lecture at the Trocadéro in Paris, she declared: "The break of women with dogma is an act of deliverance, a work of liberation, a declaration of independence... Who has debased us, abased us, if not religious faith?" She repudiated "the fable of original sin, as absurd as it is monstrous," and called for humanity to be liberated from this "legendary curse."

With support of other suffragettes such as Hubertine Auclert, Deraismes worked to achieve political emancipation for women. She stood as a symbolic candidate in the elections of 1885.

== Death and legacy ==
Maria Deraismes died of emphysema on 6 February 1894 at her home on Rue Cardinet in the 17th arrondissement of Paris. She was interred three days later in Montmartre Cemetery (31st division).

Her complete writings were published in 1895. Much information on her work can be found at the Bibliothèque Marguerite Durand in Paris.

A street in Paris was named for her. A statue by Louis-Ernest Barrias was erected in Square des Épinettes in the 17th arrondissement. The town square in Saint-Nazaire was also named in her honor. In March 2008, at the initiative of the City of Paris, Deraismes's portrait was displayed on the façade of the Panthéon as part of an exhibition of nine notable women.

Historian Jean-Claude Caron has described Deraismes as a figure who "faithfully embodies the republican spirit of the years 1870-1890." While not as radical as Hubertine Auclert or Madeleine Pelletier, she fought for the legal equality of men and women as a prelude to political equality, and she mobilized all available documentary resources—literature, theater, history, science, the arts, and news items—in her cause.

== Publications ==
=== Original editions ===
- Nos principes et nos mœurs, Paris, Michel Lévy frères, 1868.
- L’Ancien devant le nouveau, Paris, Librairie nationale, 1869.
- Lettre au clergé français, Paris, Édouard Dentu, 1879.
- Les Droits de l’enfant, Paris, Édouard Dentu, 1887.
- Épidémie naturaliste [Émile Zola et la science, discours prononcé au profit d’une société pour l’enseignement en 1880] par Maria Deraismes, Paris, Édouard Dentu, 1888, available at Gallica.
- Ève dans l’humanité, Paris, L. Sauvaitre, 1891, available at Gallica.
- Le Théâtre de M. Sardou, conference held on 21 January 1875, at the salle des Capucines, Paris, Édouard Dentu, 1875, available at Gallica.
- Ligue populaire contre l'abus de la vivisection : Discours prononcé par Mlle. Maria Deraismes, à la conférence donnée le 23 septembre 1883, au Théâtre des Nations, Paris, A. Ghio, 1884, available at Gallica.
- Œuvres complètes de Maria Deraismes
  - Volume 1 : France et progrès; Conférence sur la noblesse, Paris, Félix Alcan, October 1895, available at Gallica.
  - Volume 2 : Eve dans l'Humanité; Le Droits de l'Enfant, Paris, Félix Alcan, January 1896, available at Gallica.
  - Volume 3 : Nos Principes et nos Mœurs; L'ancien devant le Nouveau, Paris, Félix Alcan, January 1897, available at Gallica.
  - Volume 4 : Lettre au clergé français; Polémique religieuse, 1898.

=== Modern editions ===
- Éve dans l'humanité, articles et conférences de Maria Deraismes, Préface d'Yvette Roudy, éd. Abeille et Castor, Angoulême, 2008. ISBN 9781146166898
- Les Droits de L'enfant : conférence de Maria Deraismes, Lyon, Éd. Mario Mella, 1999. ISBN 9782912071071
- Ce que veulent les femmes, articles et discours de 1869 à 1894, éd. Syros, 1980. ISBN 9782901968399

== See also ==
- Le Droit Humain
- Georges Martin
- Léon Richer
- Hubertine Auclert
- History of feminism
- Women in Freemasonry

== Sources ==
- Bidelman, Patrick Kay (Summer 1976). "The Politics of French Feminism: Léon Richer and the Ligue Française pour le Droit des Femmes, 1882-1891". Historical Reflections / Réflexions Historiques. 3 (1). Berghahn Books: 93–120. JSTOR 41298677.
- McMillan, James F. (2002-01-08). France and Women, 1789-1914: Gender, Society and Politics. Routledge. p. 130. ISBN 978-1-134-58957-9.
- "History of Le Droit Humain". Ordre Maçonnique Mixte International le Droit Humain.
- Bidelman, Patrick Kay (Summer 1976). "The Politics of French Feminism: Léon Richer and the Ligue Française pour le Droit des Femmes, 1882-1891". Historical Reflections / Réflexions Historiques. 3 (1). Berghahn Books: 93–120. JSTOR 41298677.
- McMillan, James F. (2002). France and Women, 1789-1914: Gender, Society and Politics. Routledge. ISBN 978-1-134-58957-9.
- "History of Le Droit Humain". Ordre Maçonnique Mixte International Le Droit Humain.
- Sniter, Christel (June 2003). "Maria Deraismes, une féministe monumentale". Archives du féminisme.
- Caron, Jean-Claude (2008). "Maria Deraismes, Ève dans l'humanité (review)". Revue d'histoire du XIXe siècle (37): 185–242.
