= Woolstock, Iowa =

- City
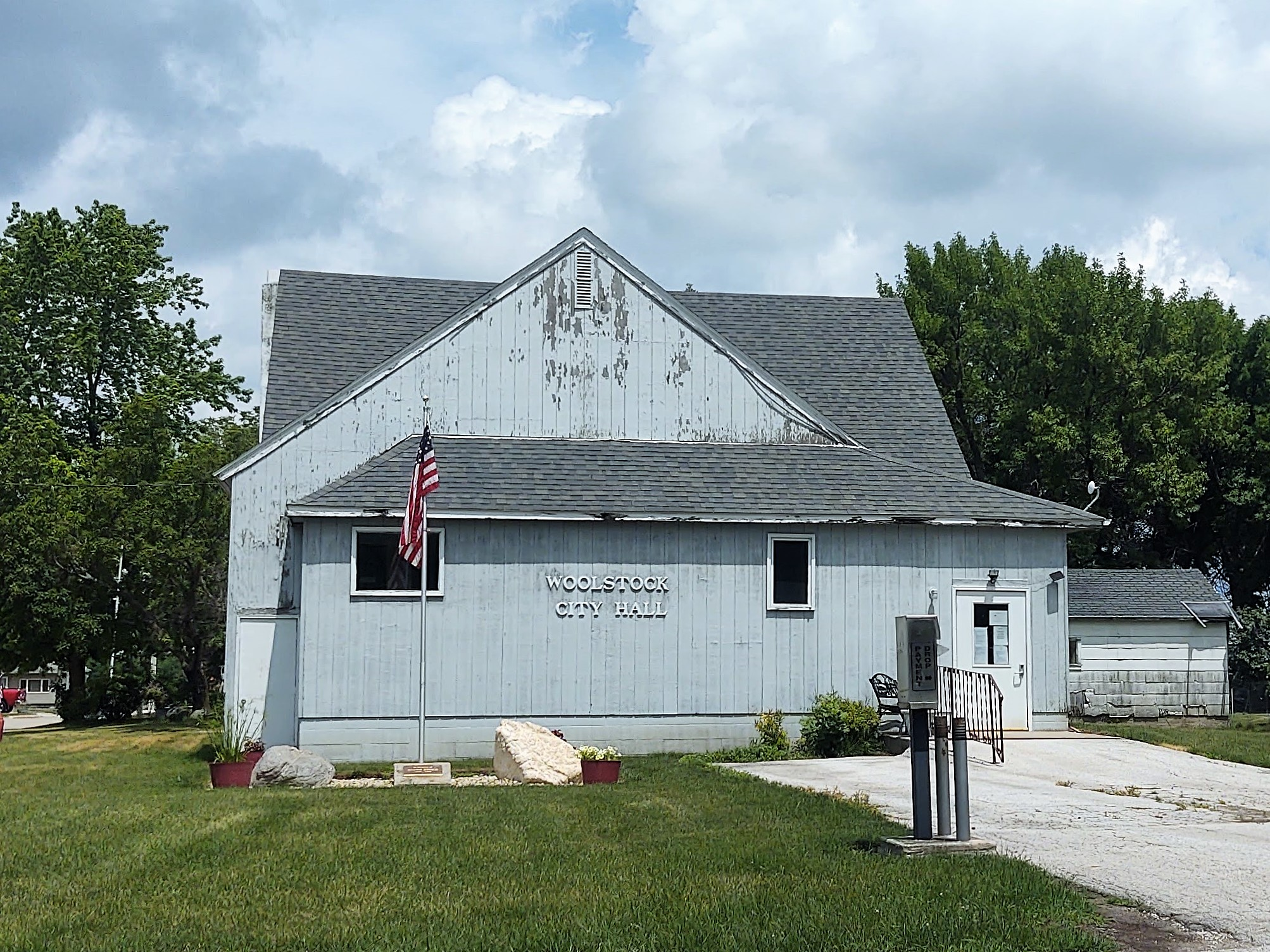
- City Hall

- Location of Woolstock, Iowa
- Coordinates: 42°33′53″N 93°50′35″W
- Country: United States
- State: Iowa
- County: Wright

Area
  - Total: 1.05 sq mi (2.71 km^{2})
  - Land: 1.05 sq mi (2.71 km^{2})
  - Water: 0 sq mi (0.00 km^{2})
- Elevation: 1,106 ft (337 m)

Population (2020)
  - Total: 144
  - Density: 137.6/sq mi (53.11/km^{2})
- Time zone: UTC-6 (Central (CST))
  - Summer (DST): UTC-5 (CDT)
- ZIP code: 50599
- Area code: 515
- FIPS code: 19-87015
- GNIS feature ID: 2397376

Woolstock is a city in Wright County, Iowa, United States. The population was 144 at the time of the 2020 census.

== History ==
Woolstock township was established in 1858, and its first Post Office for Woolstock was in 1868, located near the location of the Historic French Church, about 3 miles east of the town's location today. Woolstock was relocated when platted by the Western Town Lot Company in 1881, that relocated many rural communities towards newly laid railroad lines. The name was made by Gilbert Perry because of the settlers early trade of raising sheep for wool. Woolstock is the only town in the world with its name.

Located, east of the Boone River, the Native Americans used the area for hunting, fishing, and lodging. The Sauk and Meskwaki tribes continued to use the river seasonally through the first quarter of the 20th century.

French and German Alsatian immigrants populated the area from late 1800s through 1940s. Laurent "Frenchy" and sister Renie Grandgeorge, were the last to immigrate from that area. Most who immigrated or are descendants, are laid to rest at the Historic French Church Cemetery, est. 1896. The town of Woolstock is Sister Cities with Ban de la Roche (7 mountainous villages), Alsace, France.

== Geography ==
Woolstock is located just north of Eagle Creek's confluence with the Boone River.

According to the United States Census Bureau, the city has a total area of 1.06 square miles (2.75 km^{2}), all land.

=== Climate ===
Climate data for Woolstock, Iowa
Month	Jan	Feb	Mar	Apr	May	Jun	Jul	Aug	Sep	Oct	Nov	Dec	Year
Record high °F (°C)	72 (22)	72 (22)	89 (32)	97 (36)	107 (42)	107 (42)	109 (43)	109 (43)	103 (39)	96 (36)	81 (27)	68 (20)	93 (34)
Mean daily maximum °F (°C)	27 (−3)	33 (1)	45 (7)	60 (16)	71 (22)	80 (27)	84 (29)	82 (28)	75 (24)	62 (17)	46 (8)	30 (−1)	58 (15)
Mean daily minimum °F (°C)	8 (−13)	12 (−11)	24 (−4)	35 (2)	47 (8)	58 (14)	62 (17)	59 (15)	49 (9)	37 (3)	25 (−4)	12 (−11)	36 (2)
Record low °F (°C)	−33 (−36)	−34 (−37)	−29 (−34)	4 (−16)	17 (−8)	33 (1)	39 (4)	34 (1)	20 (−7)	−8 (−22)	−16 (−27)	−28 (−33)	−28 (−33)
Average precipitation inches (mm)	0.74 (19)	0.95 (24)	2 (51)	3.4 (86)	4.62 (117)	5.68 (144)	5.04 (128)	4.62 (117)	3.21 (82)	2.53 (64)	1.87 (47)	1.22 (31)	35.88 (910)
Source: Weatherbase

== Demographics ==
Historical populations
Year	Pop.	±%
1900	274	—
1910	264	−3.6%
1920	294	+11.4%
1930	317	+7.8%
1940	271	−14.5%
1950	255	−5.9%
1960	269	+5.5%
1970	222	−17.5%
1980	235	+5.9%
1990	212	−9.8%
2000	204	−3.8%
2010	168	−17.6%
2020	144	−14.3%
Source:"U.S. Census website". United States Census Bureau. and Iowa Data Center; Source: U.S. Decennial Census

=== 2020 census ===
As of the 2020 Census, the total population was 144 people. The population density was 135.8 people per square mile, spread over 1.06 miles. Of those 144 people, the median age was 43.5 years, with 20.7% of the town's population under the age of 18, 59.5% between the ages of 18 and 64, and 19.8% of the population over the age of 65. There were a total of 110 households, with an average of 1.3 people per household.

57% of the town's population was male, with 43% of the population female. The racial makeup of the town was 95.1% White, less than 1% African American, 3.4% mixed race, and 2% Hispanic.

The average income per capita of Woolstock was $52,517, which is higher than the state average, and the median household income was $68,750, 10% higher than the rest of the state. Only 3.7% of the town's population lives under the poverty line, which is far lower than the rest of the state.

53.9% of the population of the town is identified as currently married, but only 1.8% of women between the ages of 15 and 50 gave birth during that year, lower than the average in Iowa.

95.3% of the Woolstock population has received a high school degree, which is 2.8 percentage points higher than the rest of the state. Although Woolstock has a lower-than-average percentage of the population having received college degrees, with only 13.3% of the town's population have received college degrees compared to the state average of 30.5%.

7% of the town's population were veterans.

=== 2010 census ===
As of the census of 2010, there were 168 people, 85 households, and 44 families living in the city. The population density was 158.5 inhabitants per square mile (61.2/km^{2}). There were 100 housing units at an average density of 94.3 per square mile (36.4/km^{2}). The racial makeup of the city was 96.4% White, 0.6% African American, 0.6% Native American, and 2.4% from two or more races. Hispanic or Latino of any race were 1.2% of the population.

There were 85 households, of which 16.5% had children under the age of 18 living with them, 45.9% were married couples living together, 5.9% had a female householder with no husband present, and 48.2% were non-families. 41.2% of all households were made up of individuals, and 17.7% had someone living alone who was 65 years of age or older. The average household size was 1.98 and the average family size was 2.68.

The median age in the city was 47 years. 16.7% of residents were under the age of 18; 4.3% were between the ages of 18 and 24; 27.4% were from 25 to 44; 25.6% were from 45 to 64; and 26.2% were 65 years of age or older. The gender makeup of the city was 53.0% male and 47.0% female.

=== 2000 census ===
As of the census of 2000, there were 204 people, 98 households, and 62 families living in the city. The population density was 197.7 inhabitants per square mile (76.3/km^{2}). There were 101 housing units at an average density of 97.9 per square mile (37.8/km^{2}). The racial makeup of the city was 98.04% White, 0.49% Native American, 0.49% from other races, and 0.98% from two or more races. Hispanic or Latino of any race were 0.49% of the population.

There were 98 households, out of which 17.3% had children under the age of 18 living with them, 57.1% were married couples living together, 3.1% had a female householder with no husband present, and 36.7% were non-families. 35.7% of all households were made up of individuals, and 19.4% had someone living alone who was 65 years of age or older. The average household size was 2.08 and the average family size was 2.60.

Age spread: 16.2% under the age of 18, 6.4% from 18 to 24, 21.1% from 25 to 44, 33.3% from 45 to 64, and 23.0% who were 65 years of age or older. The median age was 50 years. For every 100 females, there were 92.5 males. For every 100 females age 18 and over, there were 98.8 males.

The median income for a household in the city was $34,479, and the median income for a family was $47,500. Males had a median income of $27,917 versus $28,594 for females. The per capita income for the city was $20,599. About 1.7% of families and 4.9% of the population were below the poverty line, including none of those under the age of eighteen and 2.3% of those 65 or over.

== Education ==
The Eagle Grove Community School District serves children from PreK to 12th grade. The district covers area of Wright, Humboldt, and Webster counties, and serves the communities of Eagle Grove, Thor, Vincent, Woolstock, Iowa|Woolstock, and the surrounding rural areas.

== Notable person ==
- George Reeves, actor and star of the iconic television series Superman

== Twin cities ==
Woolstock is twinned with the French Alsatian geographic area, Ban de la Roche, as many bandelarochiens settled in Woolstock. Ban de la Roche includes the French towns of Bellefosse, Belmont, Fouday, Neuviller-la-Roche, Rothau, Solbach, Wildersbach, and Waldersbach, the adult home of Oberlin College namesake, Jean-Frederic Oberlin.
