= Solbach =

- Commune
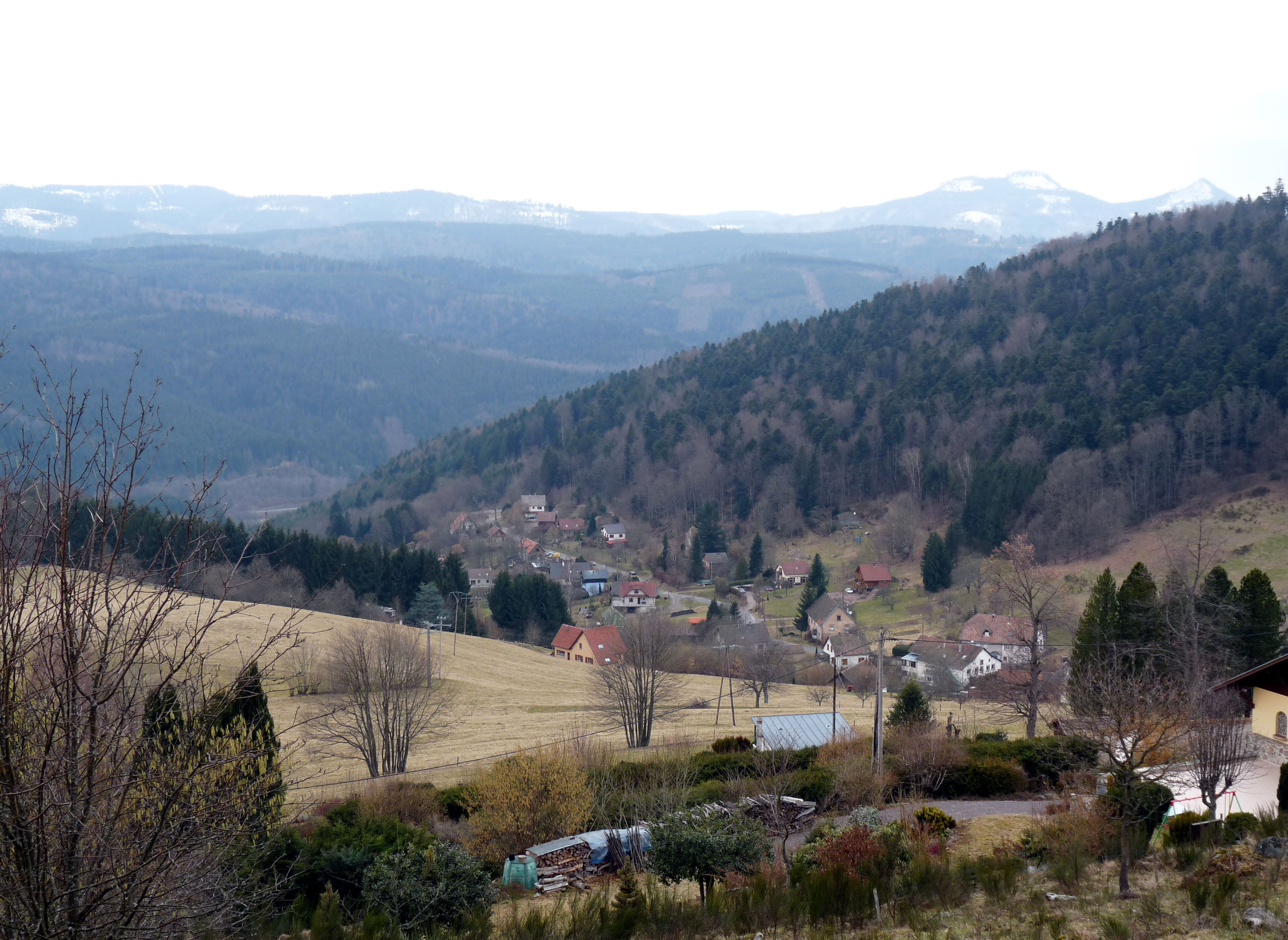
- A general view of Solbach

- Coat of arms
- Location of Solbach
- Location within France Location within Grand Est
- Coordinates: 48°25′41″N 7°12′07″E
- Country: France
- Region: Grand Est
- Department: Bas-Rhin
- Arrondissement: Molsheim
- Canton: Mutzig

Government
  - Mayor (2020–2026): Ervain Loux
- Area^{1}: 2.79 km^{2} (1.08 sq mi)
- Highest elevation: 750 m (2,460 ft)
- Lowest elevation: 367 m (1,204 ft)
- Population (2023): 111
  - Density: 39.8/km^{2} (103/sq mi)
- Time zone: UTC+01:00 (CET)
  - Summer (DST): UTC+02:00 (CEST)
- INSEE/Postal code: 67470 /67130
- ^{1} French Land Register data, which excludes lakes, ponds, glaciers > 1 km^{2} (0.386 sq mi or 247 acres) and river estuaries.

Solbach is a commune in the Bas-Rhin department in Grand Est in north-eastern France.

== Geography ==
Solbach is located on the boundary between the Rothaine and Schirgoutte valleys. Overlooking the forests of Fouday, it is near Col de la Perheux, a high hill in Ban de la Roche with an altitude of 699 meters. The highest point of the commune is Mont Saint-Jean (altitude 750 m), a large meadow-covered hill which overhangs the village. Many routes linking the village to Col de la Perheux skirt around this hill, which is a favorite of hikers.

Solbach borders on the communes of Rothau to the north, La Broque to the northwest, Fouday to the west, southwest, and south, Waldersbach to the southeast and east, and Wildersbach to the northeast.

Notably, Solbach is currently the least populated of the eight former subdivisions of Ban de la Roche, and has the second lowest population of the 23 communes of the cantons of Schirmeck and Sâales together, ahead of Blancherupt.

=== Hydrography ===
Solbach is in the Rhine river basin within the Rhine-Meuse basin. It is drained by the Bruche, whose 77-kilometer course from its source in the commune of Urbeis to its confluence with the Ill in Strasbourg runs through 37 communes.

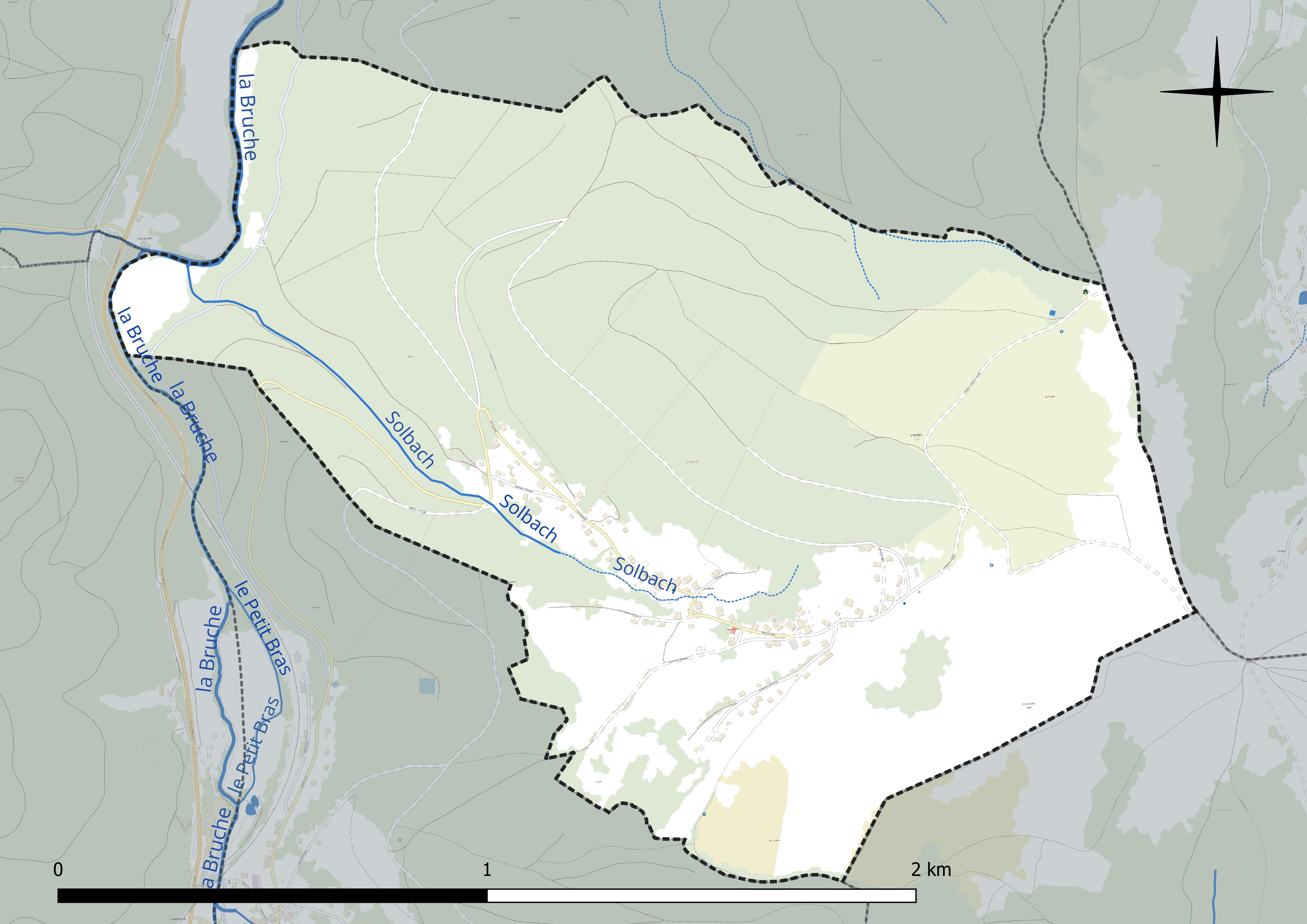
Hydrological map of Solbach. (Note: Intermittent watercourses are shown with dotted lines.)

=== Climate ===
The climate is classified as montane in the 2010 study by the French National Centre for Scientific Research based on data for 1971-2000. In the 2020 typology of the climate of France published by Météo-France, the commune has a semi-continental climate and belongs to the Vosges climatic region, characterized by high precipitation in all seasons (1,500-2000 mm/yr) and a harsh winter (less than 1 °C).

For the 1971-2000 period, the mean temperature was 8.3 °C, with a mean yearly temperature range of 16.1 °C. The mean annual precipitation was 1287 mm, with 13.6 days of precipitation in January and 12 days in July. For 1991-2020, the annual mean temperature observed at the nearest Météo-France weather station the Belmont station in Belmont (3 km) from Solbach as the crow flies), was 7.0 °C and the mean annual precipitation was 1341.9 mm. · .

The climatic parameters of the commune have been estimated for mid-century (2041-2070) according to different greenhouse gas emission scenarios based on the new DRIAS-2020 climatic reference projections., available on a website set up by Météo-France in November 2022.

== Settlement ==
=== Typology ===
As of 1 January 2004, Solbach is categorized as a rural commune with dispersed settlement according to the new seven-level commune classification defined by Insee in 2022. It is not part of an urban unit. However, it forms part of the Strasbourg functional area (French portion), in which it as an outer circle commune (Note: The city functional area concept replaced the former concept of urban area to allow useful comparison with other countries of the European Union.) · . This area, which includes 268 communes, is categorized as one of the areas other than Paris with 700,000 inhabitants or more · .

=== Land use ===
The commune's land use, as given in the European biophysical land use database Corine Land Cover (CLC), is marked by the importance of forests and semi-natural landscapes (81.9% in 2018), up from 77.8% in 1990. The detailed breakdown in 2018 is as follows: forests 60.1%, woody and/or herbaceous plant cover 21.8%, urbanized areas 9.3%, grassland 8.8%. The changes in land use and infrastructure in the commune over time can be seen in the various cartographic representations of the territory: the Cassini map (18th century), the General Staff Map (1820-1866) and the IGN's contemporary maps and areal photos.

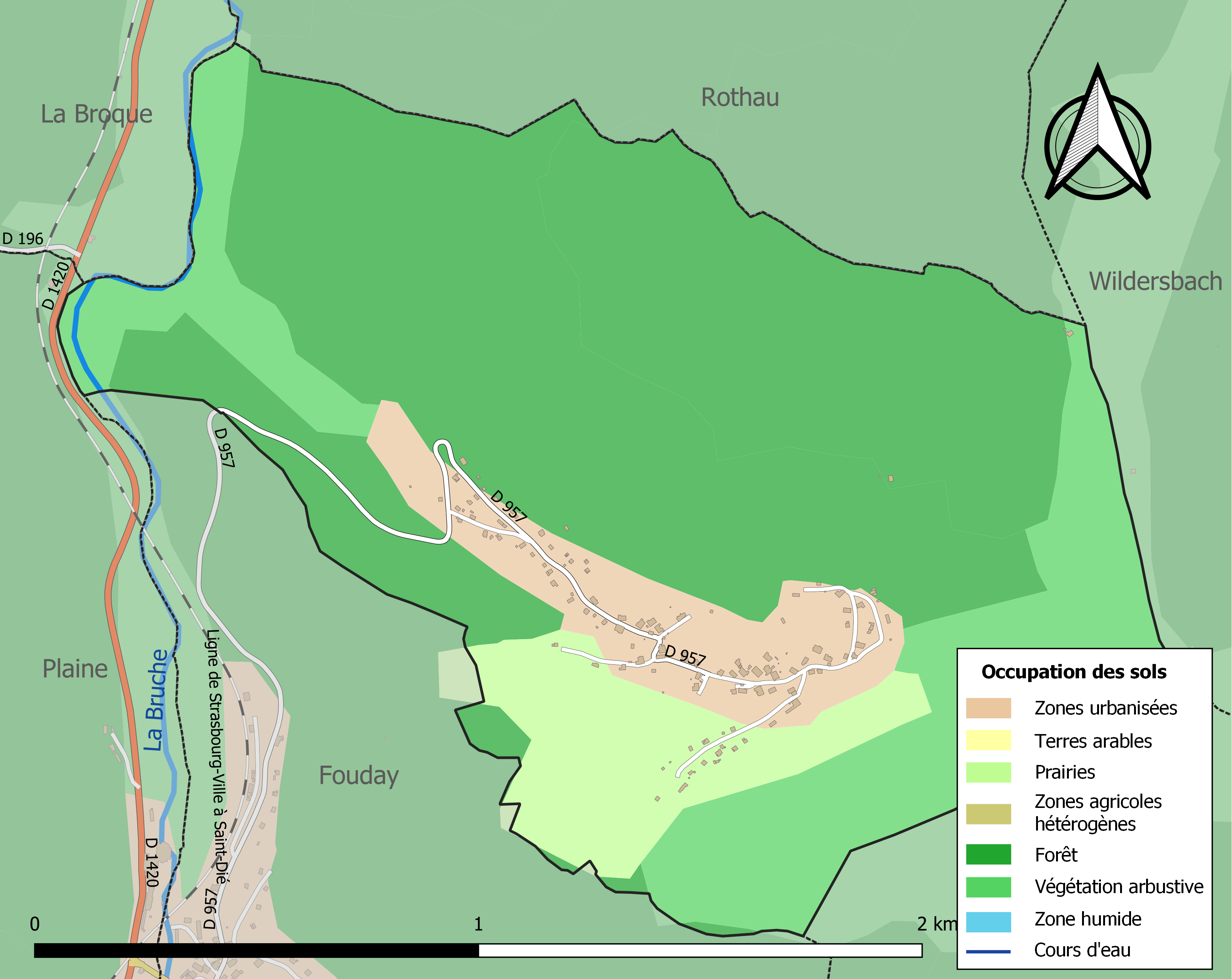
Infrastructure and land use map of the commune (2018, CLC).

== Name ==
"Solbach" is an Alsatian compound meaning "salty brook," from sol "salt" and bach "brook".

== History ==
The history of Solbach is closely tied to that of Ban de la Roche, since the commune formed part of its territory before the French Revolution. The village formerly lined the side of the Schleiffe de Berhine, which runs from the local road to the current Rue Principale, about 150 meters above the village entrance sign.

Since no textile factories have been installed as in most of the neighboring villages, agriculture has always been a major presence.

=== Heraldry ===
Solbach coat of arms.

Solbach's coat of arms are blazoned as follows:
"Parti : au premier de gueules aux trois rocs d'échiquier d'argent, au second d'argent à la fasce de sinople, à la bordure de gueules.".

== Politics and government ==
=== List of mayors ===
Current mayor: Ervain Loux (2001-2026)

=== Twin cities ===
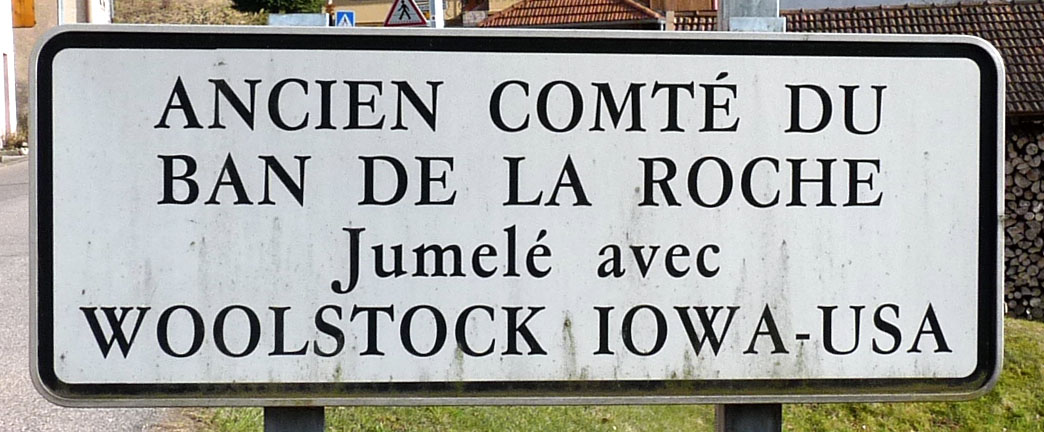
Twinning with Woolstock.

Along with seven other Ban de la Roche communes (Bellefosse, Belmont, Fouday, Neuviller-la-Roche, Rothau, Wildersbach and Waldersbach), Solbach has been twinned since 15 July 1984 with Woolstock, a small town in Iowa, United States, where immigrants from Ban de la Roche settled in the 19th century.

== Notable places and monuments ==
- Church overlooking the valley.

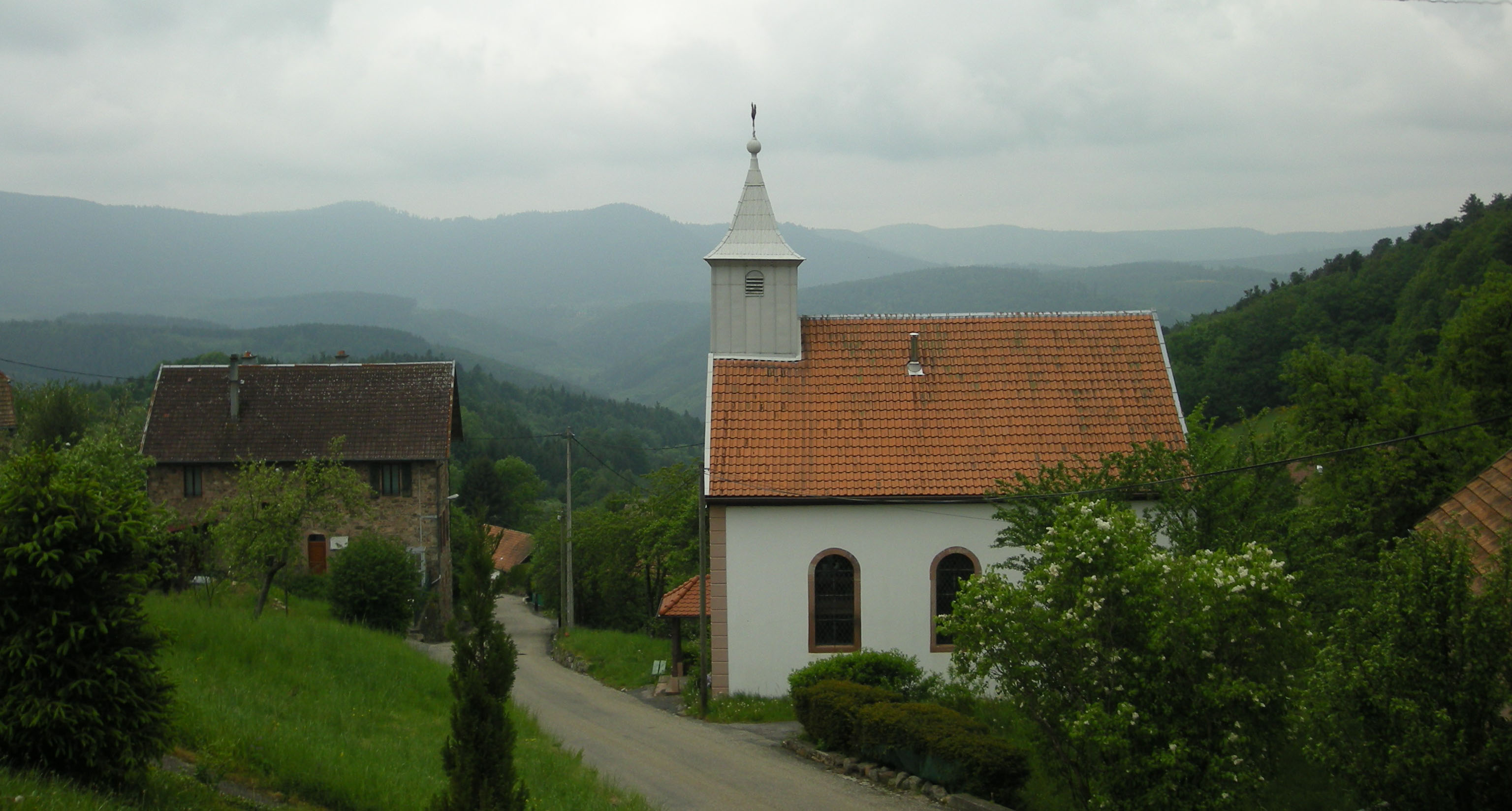
Church overlooking the valley.

== See also ==
- Ban de la Roche
- Communes of the Bas-Rhin department

== Bibliography ==
- Carlos Fischer, Alsace Champêtre. Le parfait village, E. Sansot, Paris, 1907, 95 p., (réédité : Le parfait village. Solbach, Ban de la roche, 1904, Jean-Pierre Kruch éd., 1979, 91 p.)
- R. Godié et J. Elringer, « De "pile" en fontaine », L'Essor, No. 181
- ISC, « Ah ! qu'il est beau mon village (Solbach) », L'Essor, No. 16
- Arnold Kientzler, « Jean Bernard, de Solbach. Le dernier sabotier du Ban de la Roche », L'Essor, No. 133
- Denis Leypold, Le Ban de la Roche au temps des seigneurs de Rathsamhausen et de Veldenz (1489-1630), Oberlin, Strasbourg, 1989, 119 p.
- Denis Leypold, Solange Hisler, Pierre Moll, Eva Braun, Jean Frédéric Oberlin au Ban de la Roche, Association du Musée Oberlin, 1991, 89 p.
- Claude Mayens, « Une commune d'ouvriers paysans : Solbach », L'Essor, 97 p.
- « Les anciens commerces disparus », L'Essor, No. 200 (travail réalisé par les écoles primaires)
- « Solbach », in La Haute vallée de la Bruche, Patrimoine d’Alsace, Inventaire général des monuments et des richesses artistiques de la France, Éditions Lieux Dits, Lyon, 2005, p. 64-66 ISBN 978-2-914528-13-9
- Daniel Mehl, "Solbach historique et pittoresque" (74 pages) ; réalisation graphique et impression par Pointillés à Bischheim - Dépôt légal 2018.
- Daniel Mehl, "Promenade illustrée par les cartes postales" 87 pages - 110 cartes. Réalisation graphique et impression par Pointillés à Bischheim. Dépôt légal 2021 ISBN 979-10-976034-03
