= Sara Banzet =

French educator and diarist

Sara Banzet (8 July 1745 in Belmont – 24 April 1774 in Belmont) was a French educator and diarist. She was an educational pioneer, the founder of the écoles maternelles (the nursery schools of France). She is also known for her preserved diary, which is regarded as an important historical document of her contemporary France.

== Childhood and training ==
Sara Banzet was born in 1745 in the Alsation village of Belmont, in the seigneury of Ban de la Roche, into a peasant family. Servant of the wife of pastor Jean Georges Stuber in Waldersbach, she bore witness to her master's efforts to improve the condition of his parishioners, particularly in terms of education. The Ban de la Roche is situated in the middle of mountains (Belmont is the highest town in the current department of Ban de la Roche) and agriculture was particularly difficult there in the middle of the 18th century, which generated permanent misery, with isolated villages in the winter months. In order to improve local incomes, Madame Stuber organised knitting classes for the women and young girls. This is where Sara Banzet learnt to knit.

The only primary education provided was by teachers hired by the pastor. However Sara was fortunate that her childhood education corresponded mainly to the years of ministry of Jean-Georges Stuber (1750-1754, then 1760-1767), himself a pioneer in education, who recruited competent teachers (including Jacques Claude, Sara's distant cousin). She improved her reading studies through the use of the Methodical Alphabet. The pastor also created a small lending library for his parishioners, making available about a hundred books.

== Inventor of the kindergarten ==
Pastor Stuber did a great deal for education in general. But it was Sara Banzet herself who, following a suggestion made by Jean-Frédéric Oberlin to Jean-Georges Stuber in the fall of 1766, about the role women could play in educating very young children, took the initiative in the spring of 1767 to gather around her at Belmont very young children, and to give them an education adapted to their age: songs, new words, observation of plants, and stories drawn from the Bible. Knitting was learnt in the only heated room in the house, called the 'stove' in the local language. Those of the children who were able to brought a log. The young woman's 'knitting stove' is therefore the first kindergarten. Sara Banzet is the real inventor, even if her initiative is then approved and supported both by Pastor Stuber and by Pastor Jean-Frédéric Oberlin, who succeeded him in the same year 1767.

Learning that Sara Banzet taught knitting to the children of her village, from 1769 Pastor Oberlin rented premises to accommodate the children and hired two new "conductors of tender youth", Louise Scheppler et Anne-Catherine Gagnière. Sara Banzet supervised them voluntarily at the beginning, then, to appease her father who complained that she was wasting her time, Jean-Frédéric Oberlin officially hired her with a small remuneration.

The 'knitting stoves' which provided early education to children while allowing their mothers to earn a living became a fundamental element of the educational, social and human work of Pastor Oberlin.

Sara Banzet, of whom there is no representation, died at the age of 28 in 1774.

== In literature ==
The life and work of Sara Banzet are the subject of a novel by Olympia Alberti, in the form of a fictional diary by the heroine.
