= Ban de la Roche =

Le Ban de la Roche (German: Steintal) is the name of an ancient seigneurie, later a county. It is situated in Alsace, France, Département du Bas-Rhin. This small region is referred by its old Ancien régime name because of its strong identity and because it is relatively different from its neighbors, including the fact that it was a Lutheran community surrounded by Catholic villages. There was an Amish farm in the village of Neuviller.

== Villages ==
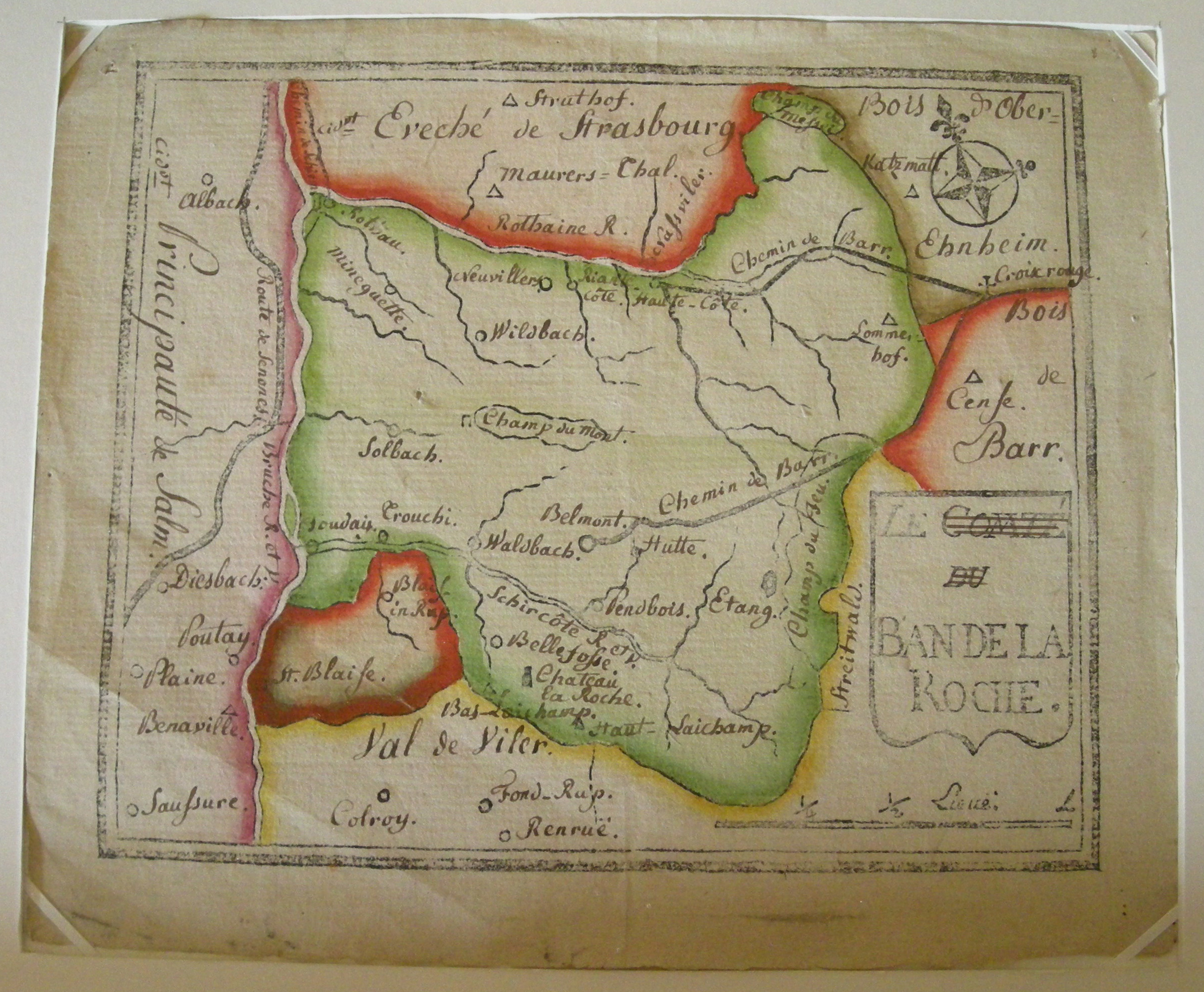
Map of Ban de la Roche, made by minister Oberlin in 1776

The Seigneurie included eight villages: Rothau (Seigneurie-seat), Wildersbach, Neuviller-la-Roche (along with hamlets La Haute Goutte and Riangoutte), Waldersbach, Bellefosse, Belmont, Fouday (with the hamlet Trouchy) and Solbach.

== History ==
One of the most important lords of Ban de la Roche was Georges-Jean de Veldenz (German: Georg Hans von Veldenz) (1543–1592), son-in-law of the king of Sweden, and founder of the city of Phalsbourg. Count de Veldenz bought Le Ban de la Roche for its mining possibilities.

There were many witchcraft trials held in Le Ban de la Roche in the 1620s.

Ban de la Roche was on the Amish centre. There was an Amish farm ("cense" in the local way of speaking) called Sommerhof in La Haute Goutte.

Beginning in 1736, many emigrants traveled to the United States to the state of Pennsylvania aboard ship Princess Augusta. The 19th century emigrants went to Ohio and Illinois.

It was a land of Lutheran pietism and religious intolerance.

== Notable people ==
- It is also the land of the famous minister and philanthropist J. F. Oberlin, whose parish was Waldersbach.
- Frédérique Brion, who had a love affair with Goethe, briefly lived in Rothau
- Gustave Brion was an artist who illustrated Victor Hugo's masterpieces Les Misérables and Notre-Dame de Paris
- Philippe-Frédéric de Dietrich, Count of Le Ban de la Roche, Maire of Strasbourg, an industrialist, a scientist and a man of the Lumières, a friend of La Fayette; La Marseillaise, the French national hymn, was at first sung in his parlour in Strasbourg; he was guillotined.

== Twin city in Iowa ==
Le Ban de la Roche is twinned with Woolstock, Iowa, where many Bandelarochians emigrated.
