= Daniel Legrand =

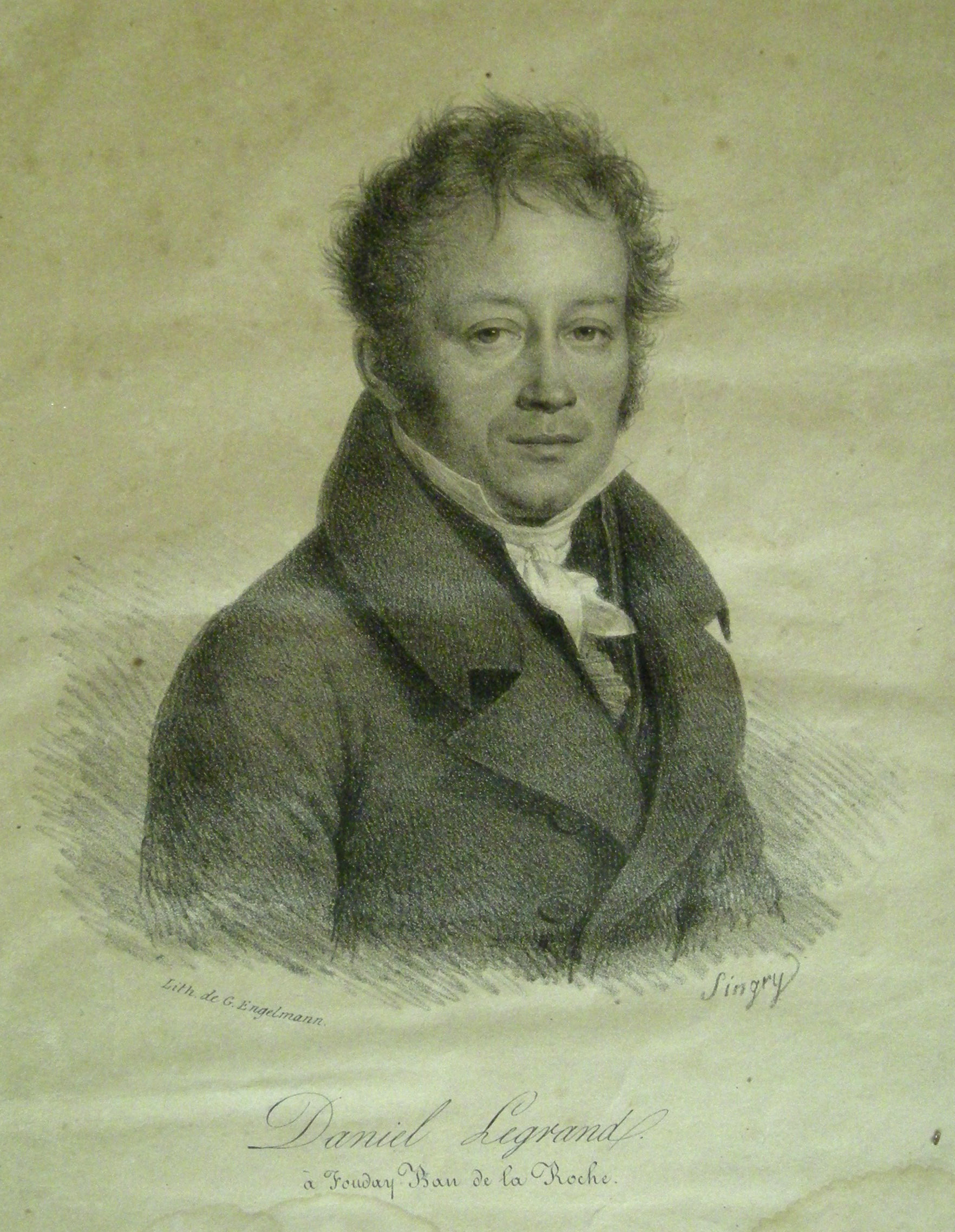
- Born: 1783; Basel, Switzerland
- Died: 16 March 1859 (aged 75–76); Ban de la Roche, France
- Occupation: Industrialist
- Known for: Ideas on international labor law

Daniel Legrand (1783 – 16 March 1859) was a Swiss industrialist and philanthropist of the Reformed Church who spent most of his life in Alsace, France. He campaigned for laws that would improve the condition of child workers, and of industrial workers in general. His ideas contributed to the later development of international labor law.

== Life ==
Daniel Legrand was born at Basel on 28 November 1783. His father was Johann Lukas Legrand (or Jean-Luc Legrand, 1755–1836), president of Directory of the Helvetic Republic. Daniel Legrand was given a sound, moral education based on 18th century philosophical principles. He spent two years at the Reichenau institute in Graubünden, then studied mathematics at Neuchâtel before returning to Basel to help his father in his ribbon factory. The factory was run on paternalist lines. The workers were lodged in the factory. The owner presided with his family at meals, and he and his son directed the education of the children.

After being forced out of office, his father moved to Alsace, France and founded a ribbon factory. Daniel helped with the business. In 1812 Daniel Legrand visited Ban de la Roche, where he met Jean-Frédéric Oberlin (1740–1826). Oberlin has been called the "true precursor of social Christianity in France." Legrand came under the spell of the pastor, and moved with his ribbon factory to nearby Fouday, where he lived for the rest of his life. He became known for his frank piety and openness to members of different Christian sects. According to the Reverend Frederick Monod,

Among men who have had the privilege of knowing him, who does not preserve a lasting remembrance of that animated face, in which were depicted an affectionate kindness, an expansive charity, a Christian peace and joy—the work of the Holy Spirit—that nothing in the world seemed able to disturb?

Legrand thought that a Christian who owned property should give half of his income to the service of God and the poor. He provided good conditions to his workers, including housing and schools. He did not mechanize his factory, but let his employees work at home. He petitioned with some success for laws that would reduce the working hours of children in the factories. In Legrand's 1841 Lettre d'un industriel des montagnes des Vosges he threw down a challenge to the French leaders when he said that even England had "found that all its interests, without exception, imperiously demanded the intervention of the legislation in order to fix the age, working hours and schooling of its factory workers in order to save them from ruin and perdition." Legrande was a believer in small-scale family industry, where children worked with their parent, and hours were shorter than was common at the time. This would avoid the corrupting influence of the factory on children, would strengthen family bonds and would provide long-term social benefits.

Legrand was active throughout his life in distributing copies of the Scriptures and religious tracts. Daniel Legrand died at home in Ban de la Roche on 16 March 1859.

== Legacy ==
Legrand's grandson was Tommy Fallot, founder of "Christianisme social." At the time of his death Legrand was trying to get support for an international law to regulate industrial occupations. Legrand and Robert Owen (1771–1853) of Wales, another industrialist, advocated creation of an international organization dedicated to reform of labor laws. They wanted to reverse the steady deterioration of conditions for industrial workers and remove the causes of social unrest. Coordination of simultaneous labor law reform at the international level would avoid the issue of early reformers losing competitive advantage. Eventually these ideas took fruit with the establishment of the International Labour Organization after World War I (1914–18).

== Works ==
- Daniel Legrand (1841). Lettre d'un industriel des montagnes des Vosges à M. le baron Charles Dupin, rapporteur de la Commission de la Chambre des pairs chargée de l'examen du Projet de loi sur le travail des enfants dans les manufactures, usines et ateliers; suivie de plusieurs lettres et adresses : dernier appel respectueux et pressant à MM. les membres des deux Chambres et du Ministère et à leur sollicitude éclairée pour les intérêts si précieux de la classe ouvrière. Strasbourg: Berger-Levrault. p. 25.
- Daniel Legrand. Mémoire d'un industriel des montagnes des Vosges adressé a monsieur le Ministre du Commerce et des Manufactures.'
- Daniel Legrand. Appel respectueux d'un industriel de la vallée des Vosges, illustrée par le vénérable Oberlin, adressé aux gouvernements de la France, de l'Angleterre, de la Prusse, des autres états de l'Allemagne et de la Suisse; dans le but de provoquer des lois particulières et une loi internationale, destinées à protéger la classe ouvrière contre le travail précoce et excessif.
- Daniel Legrand (1840–41). Les relais, ou la mère de famille et le fileur fiction d'une triste réalité.
- Daniel Legrand. Projet de loi sur le travail et l'instruction des enfants employés dans les manufactures, usines et ateliers; en réponse à la circulaire de M. le Ministre Secrétaire d'Etat de l'agriculture et du commerce, du 1er juillet 1840.
- Daniel Legrand (1979). Sur le travail des enfants dans les manufactures. 1830-1855. 13 brochures with a preface by Norbert Olszak. Paris: EDHIS.

== Sources ==
- Chalamet, Christophe (2013-01-16). Revivalism and Social Christianity: The Prophetic Faith of Henri Nick and Andre Trocme. Wipf and Stock Publishers. ISBN 978-1-61097-858-3.
- Dankers, Cora (2003). "2.2 Labour Standards and Social Accountability" (PDF). ENVIRONMENTAL AND SOCIAL STANDARDS, CERTIFICATION AND LABELLING FOR CASH CROPS. Rome: Food and Agriculture Organization of the United Nations.
- De Felice, Professor (1859). "Daniel Legrand, The Philanthropist of France". The Christian guest, revised by N. Macleod.
- Lynch, Katherine A. (1988). Family, Class, and Ideology in Early Industrial France: Social Policy and the Working-class Family, 1825-1848. Univ of Wisconsin Press. p. 181. ISBN 978-0-299-11794-8.
- Monnier, Frédéric (1859). Notice sur D. Legrand.
- X.X.X (1848). "Death of M. Daniel Legrand". Evangelical Christendom.
