= Marc Boegner =

French theologian, pastor and essayist

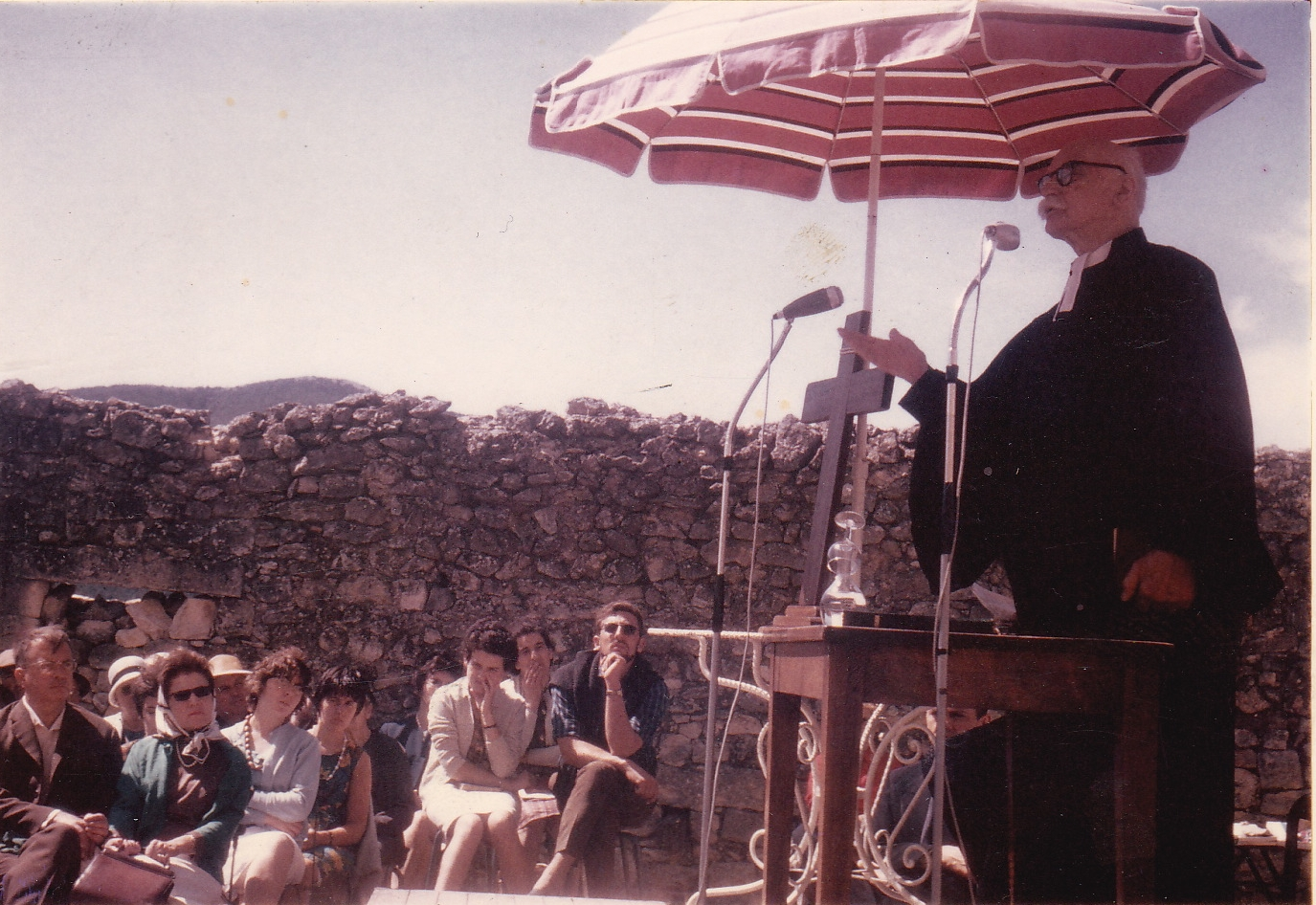
- Conference at Le Poët-Laval (1965)
- Born: 21 February 1881; Épinal
- Died: 18 December 1970 (aged 89); Paris
- Occupations: Pastor, president of the Reformed Church of France
- Known for: Righteous Among the Nations

Marc Boegner, commonly known as pasteur Boegner (French: [pastœʁ bœɲe]; 21 February 1881 – 18 December 1970), was a French theologian, pastor, essayist, notable member of the French Resistance and a notable voice in the ecumenical movement.

== Biography ==
Marc Boegner was the nephew and disciple of the Lutheran pastor Tommy Fallot, who founded Christian socialism in France. Born in Épinal, Vosges in 1881, Boegner was educated in Orléans, and later Paris, where he studied law. Poor eyesight was an obstacle to his pursuit of a career within the navy but after a spiritual conversion experience he entered the Faculty for Theology in Paris and in 1905 was ordained a pastor of the Reformed Church of France. After having been a Protestant pastor in a rural parish in Aouste-sur-Sye in Drôme, in 1911 he became professor of theology at the House of the Missions of Paris, and in 1918 went on to the Parish of Poissy-Annonciation where he remained until 1952. In 1928, he inaugurated the sermons of Protestant Lent on the radio, which contributed to his notoriety. There he preached on the unity of Christians. In 1929, he became the first president of the Protestant Federation of France (Fédération protestante de France), a position he held until 1961. In 1938 he became the first president of the national council of the Reformed Church of France (l'Église réformée de France), a post he held until 1950. He was on two occasions the professor at the Academy of International Law at The Hague. Between 1938 and 1948 he was president of the administrative committee of the provisional World Council of Churches in formation. After the council had been formed he became one of its co-presidents, a post he held until 1954. In 1955 Marc Boegner presented a television show called Présence protestante.

Boegner actively worked, during the occupation, in an open way as well as clandestinely, to try to improve the lot of the Jews, and even defended and saved a number of them. His compassion extended also to many political refugees. He intervened with Pierre Laval, in vain, to ask him to give up including Jewish children younger than 16 years in the deportation convoys. In 1943, he condemned the forced sending of workers to Germany under the STO. Against violence and the armed struggle, he let his faith and conscience choose against joining the Maquis in an early stage. His action to help the Jews during the war made him be awarded the Righteous among the Nations in Yad Vashem in 1988.

Having met six times, in the middle of his resistance work, Marshal Philippe Pétain, he was decorated with the Order of the Francisque and was named a member of the National Council of Vichy. He remained, at the time of his questioning in the Allied lawsuit against the old leader, on 30 July 1945, to testify for the good intentions and the goodwill expressed by Pétain in the difficult circumstances of France - a lenient idea of Pétain's actions, today contradicted by authors and some historians.

After the war, he continued his fight for unity while taking part in the ecumenical movement (mouvement œcuménique). He was also a Protestant observer during the Second Vatican Council (1962–1965) during which he staged a public dialogue with Cardinal Bea in Geneva. He also met Pope Paul VI. The ecumenical movement is the subject of his last book published in 1968 (The Long Road to Unity, Eng. trans. 1970).

Boegner died in Paris.

== Works ==
- Les Catéchismes de Calvin, étude d'histoire et de catéchétique, thèse de doctorat soutenue devant la faculté de théologie protestante en 1905
- The Unity of the Church (1914)
- La Vie et la pensée de T. Fallot, 2 vol. (1914–1926)
- L'Influence de la Réforme sur le développement du droit international (1926)
- Le Christianisme et le monde moderne (1928, recueil de prédications)
- Les Missions protestantes et le droit international (1929)
- Dieu, l'éternel tourment des hommes (1929, recueil de prédications)
- Jésus-Christ (1930, recueil de prédications)
- T. Fallot, l'homme et l'œuvre (1931)
- Qu'est-ce que l'Église ? (1931, recueil de prédications)
- L'Église et les questions du temps présent (1932)
- La Vie chrétienne (1933)
- Le Christ devant la souffrance et devant la joie (1935, recueil de prédications)
- L'Évangile et le racisme (1939)
- Le Problème de l'unité chrétienne (1947, recueil de prédications)
- La Prière de l'Église universelle (1951)
- La Vie triomphante (1953)
- Le Chrétien et la souffrance (1956)
- Les Sept paroles de la Croix (1957)
- Notre vocation à la sainteté (1958)
- Ténèbres et Lumières aux abords du Calvaire (1960, recueil de prédications)
- L'Exigence œcuménique des Églises. Souvenirs et perspectives (1968)

== Memberships and decorations ==
=== Ecclesiastical ===
- President of the French Federation of Christian associations of students (1923–1935),
- President of the Protestant Federation of France (1929–1961),
- President of the national council of the reformed Church of France (1938–1950),
- President of the Company of the evangelic missions of France (1945–1968),
- President of the oecumenical Movement of the Christian Churches (1948–1954).

=== Other ===
- Member of the Académie des sciences morales et politiques (1946)
- Member of the Académie française (1962). To date, Marc Boegner remains the only Pastor to ever be elected in the Académie française.
- Righteous among the Nations (1988)
- Grand Officer of the Légion d'honneur
