= Tommy Fallot =

French pastor (1844–1904)

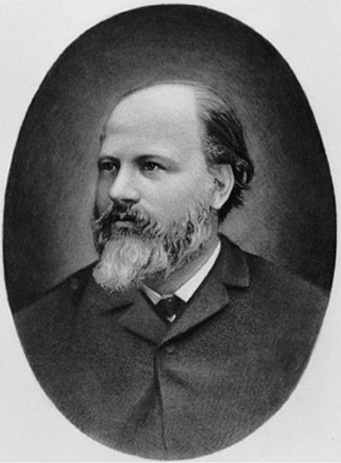
- Born: 4 October 1844; Fouday, Bas-Rhin, France
- Died: 3 September 1904 (aged 59); Mirabel-et-Blacons, Drôme, France
- Other name: Lutheran pastor
- Known for: Christian socialism

Tommy Fallot (4 October 1844 – 3 September 1904) was a French pastor who is known as the founder of Christian socialism in France.

== Early years ==
Tommy Fallot was born on 4 October 1844 in Fouday, Bas-Rhin. His grandfather was Daniel Legrand (1783–1859), an industrialist and Christian in Ban de la Roche, Alsace (Note: Ban de la Roche was an ancient seigneurie, later a county, in Alsace. Fouday is one of its eight villages.) who felt that the gospel message was primarily for the poor and unfortunate, despite their suffering. Fallot earned a doctorate in theology in Strasbourg in 1872. His thesis was on "The Poor and the Gospel". He spent four years as Lutheran pastor of Wildersbach, near the Ban de la Roche. He then left the Lutheran church and moved to Paris, where the Free Church had offered him a position.

== Evangelist ==
Tommy Fallot was pastor at the Chapelle du Nord, a church of the Reformed Church of France (Église Réformée de France) on the rue des Petits-Hôtels in Paris. From there he led a program of evangelization among the working people. He was influenced by the work of the English clergyman Robert Whitaker McAll, who held "moral conferences" to carry the message of the Gospel to the poorest people. This followed the Réveil movement that had earlier swept 19th century Europe.

Fallot founded the French League for the Rehabilitation of Public Morality (Ligue pour le relèvement de la moralité publique), which gained widespread support in Paris and the provinces. By 1878 the future feminist Jeanne Schmahl had become active in Fallot's League, which was mainly concerned with abolition of alcohol and pornography. From 1882 Fallot also addressed the issue of prostitution. This was the outcome of a meeting with Josephine Butler (1828–1906), who was undertaking a campaign in England against this scourge.

Fallot began to adhere to socialist ideas, although condemning class warfare preached by leaders who "dream of revenge and conquest". Fallot founded the Cercle socialiste de la libre pensée chrétienne, which in 1882 became the Société d’aide fraternelle et d’études sociales. In 1887 Fallot and the economist Charles Gide founded the Protestant Association for Practical Study of Social Questions (Association protestante pour l'étude pratique des questions sociales). The association considered the social impact of industrialization from the perspective of liberal economics. It took the view that these impacts were unavoidable and had to be treated on a case by case basis. The association published the Journal of Practical Christianity (Revue du Christianisme pratique). Fallot is considered to be the founder of the French "Social Christianity" movement.

Fallot's was concerned with the future of the church. His nephew and disciple Marc Boegner, quoted him as saying "The church will be catholic or will not be; the Christian will be protestant or will disappear... I henceforth consider myself a catholic Protestant." Fallot used the word "catholic" in the broad sense that the Anglicans use it, rather than as a synonym for Roman Catholic as commonly understood in France. By 1890 Fallot, who was in poor health and disappointed at the lack of enthusiasm for his socialist ideas in the Protestant establishment, asked to be given a simple parish in the country. He spent the last ten years of his life as pastor of Sainte-Croix, and then Aouste, near Crest in the Drôme department. Tommy Fallot died in Mirabel-et-Blacons, Drôme on 3 September 1904.

== Selected publications ==
- Alfred Boegner; Tommy Fallot. Pour la vie intérieure: la prière: conseils et expériences.
- Tommy Fallot (1872). Les pauvres et l'Evangile (thesis). p. 51.
- Tommy Fallot (1883). La religion laïque, religion du Père: discours.
- Tommy Fallot (1885). La reglementation de la prostitution. Lettre au redacteur en chef du journal "Le Havre". Fischbacher. p. 81.
- Tommy Fallot (1884). La femme esclave: Conférence. Fédér. Brit. Continent. p. 81.
- Tommy Fallot; Emile Dietz; Charles Boegner (1886). A la mémoire de Madame Pauline-Emma Steinheil: discours prononcés aux obsèques. Typographie de G. Fischbach. p. 21.
- Tommy Fallot (1889). Madame Caroline de Barrau de Muratel. impr. Blind-Franck. p. 9.
- Tommy Fallot (1891). Ligue française pour le relèvement de la moralité publique. Notre nouvelle campagne. Fischbacher. p. 55.
- Tommy Fallot (1891). Communication sur l'organisation de la lutte contre la pornographie: faite au congrès de l'Association protestante pour l'étude pratique des questions sociales. Marseille, 28 et 29 octobre 1891. impr. de V.-E. Gauthier. p. 52.
- Tommy Fallot (1893). Simple explication, trois lettres à un ami, par T. Fallot. impr. de J. Céas et fils. p. 103.
- Tommy Fallot (1894). Ligue française de la moralité publique. Rapport par T. Fallot,... impr. de J. Céas. p. 7.
- Tommy Fallot (1897). Qu'est-ce qu'une église?: Un chapitre de christianisme pratique. Fischbacher (1926 edition). p. 212.
- Tommy Fallot (1899). Pour aider à l'organisation de l'effort missionnaire en France.
- Tommy Fallot (1902). Le Dieu Masqué: entretiens d'un pasteur avec une mère de famille. A. Ducros. p. 72.
- Tommy Fallot (1902). Une Noble entreprise, l'Union internationale des amies de la jeune fille. A. Ducros. p. 119.
- Tommy Fallot (1906). Le livre de l'action bonne. Fischbacher.
- Tommy Fallot (1909). Comment lire la Bible jour après jour. Libairie Fishbacher. p. 515.
- Tommy Fallot (1911). Christianisme social, études et fragments. Fischbacher. p. 344.
- Charles Wagner; Tommy Fallot; John Viénot (1923). Sur l'éducation religieuse: pensées et fragments inédits. aux bureaux de l'Union nationale des églises réformées de France. p. 31.
- Tommy Fallot (2011-10-01). Protestantisme et socialisme. Ampelos Editions. p. 144. ISBN 978-2-35618-038-4.

== Sources ==
- Hill, Christopher; Monsarrat, J.-P. (1999). "Un panorama des relations entre l'église d'Angleterre et les églises réformées en France". "Appelés à témoigner et à servir": l'affirmation commune de Reuilly : dialogue entre les églises anglicanes de Grande-Bretagne et d'Irlande et les églises luthériennes et réformés de France. Editions Olivetan. ISBN 978-2-85304-147-8.
- Mary, Jacques (2015). "Historique de la Chapelle du Nord à Paris". Les temples protestants de France (in French).
- Metz, Annie (December 2007). "Jeanne Schmahl et la loi sur le libre salaire de la femme". Bulletin du Archives du Féminisme (in French) (13).
- "Œuvres sociales". Musée virtuel du Protestantisme (in French).
- "Tommy Fallot (1844-1904)" (in French). BnF.
- "Tommy Fallot (1844-1904)". Musée virtuel du Protestantisme.
