= Jeanne Schmahl =

French-British suffragette and feminist

Jeanne Elizabeth Schmahl
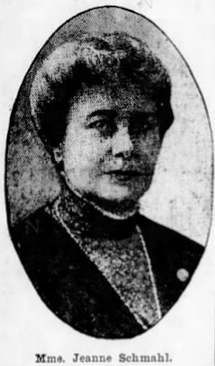
- Schmal in September 1911
- Born: Jeanne Elizabeth Archer; 1846; Great Britain
- Died: 1915 (aged 68–69)
- Occupation: Midwife
- Known for: Feminist activism
- Spouse: Henri Schmahl

Jeanne Elizabeth Schmahl (née Archer; 1846–1915) was a French feminist, born in Britain. She married a well-off husband who supported her while she worked as a midwife's assistant in Paris. She decided to avoid politics and religion and to focus on specific and practical feminist goals. She led a successful campaign to change the laws so women could legally bear witness and could control their own earnings. She launched the French Union for Women's Suffrage to campaign for the right of women to vote, but that was not achieved in her lifetime.

== Early years ==
Jeanne Elizabeth Archer was born in Great Britain in 1846. Her father was English and her mother was French. Her father was a lieutenant in the British Navy. She studied medicine in Edinburgh, but was not able to complete her course. Sophia Jex-Blake was trying to open the profession to women but had not yet succeeded. Schmahl was a friend of Jex-Blake, and in contact with the feminist movement in England. She went to France to continue her medical studies, but interrupted them when she married Henri Schmahl, a Frenchman from Alsace, and took the name of Jeanne Schmahl. However, she acted as an assistant to professional midwives until 1893. She became a French national in 1873 through her marriage. She was supported by her husband and lived in comfort beside the Parc Montsouris.

== Women's rights to witness and dispose of income ==
By 1878 Jeanne Schmahl had become active in groups led by Maria Deraismes and the pastor Tommy Fallot. She joined the League for Raising Public Morality (Ligue pour le relèvement de la moralité publique), which was mainly concerned with making alcohol and pornography illegal. Schmahl joined Léon Richer's group after she became interested in women's rights. Schmahl also joined the Society for the Amelioration of Woman's Condition which had been created by Maria Deraismes. Schmahl was incensed when she discovered that a woman had been dismissed from her job after she asked her employer not to give her wages to her alcoholic spouse.

Schmahl admired the British Married Women's Property Act 1882 and she believed a similar law would benefit French women. Schmahl thought that the strategy of the groups, led by Richer and Deraismes, of mixing religion and politics with women's issues was a mistake. She thought this was "one of the great reasons for the movement's lack of success in France." She decided to instead direct her efforts at specific issues. In January 1893 Schmahl founded the Avant-Courrière (Forerunner) association, which called for the right of women to be witnesses in public and private acts, and for the right of married women to take the product of their labor and dispose of it freely. As Schmahl wrote in 1896,

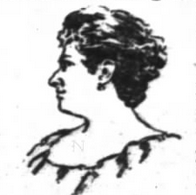
Jeanne Schmahl in 1895

Taking into consideration that the Civil Code is the one great obstacle to the emancipation of women in France, we decided to attack it. Not, however, in its entirety, as had previously been attempted, but piecemeal, beginning by what appeared to be least defended by our opponents and therefore easiest of conquest; at the same time choosing the point which should logically come first, as the foundation of women's freedom. We were not long in coming to the conclusion that, financial freedom being the root of all liberty, we must first set to work to obtain for married women the right to their own earnings.

The campaign aimed to mobilize middle- and upper-class women who had moderate and conservative views. Anne de Rochechouart de Mortemart (1847–1933), Duchess of Uzès and Juliette Adam (1836–1936) soon joined the Avant-Courrière, and Schmahl found support from Jane Misme (1865–1935), who later founded the journal La Française and Jeanne Chauvin (1862–1926), the first woman to become a doctor of law. Schmahl published a journal, L'Avant-Courrière. The society grew to 200 members. The Avant-Courrière managed to get the support of printing houses who printed posters at no charge for display across Paris and in major provincial cities. The law to allow women to bear witness passed the Chamber of Deputies and the Senate in 1897.

The Chamber of Deputies passed the earnings bill in 1896. The Senate stalled on this bill, and it was not until July 1907 that it finally approved a version of the act. Schmahl then dissolved the l'Avant-Courrière, which had achieved its goals. The 1907 Married Woman's Earnings Act was often called the "Schmahl Law". The Act was incomplete. If a woman bought something with her earnings that she did not consume herself, such as a piece of furniture, it became her husband's property unless there was a marriage contract that specified otherwise. This would normally only be the case with prosperous couples.

== Women's suffrage ==
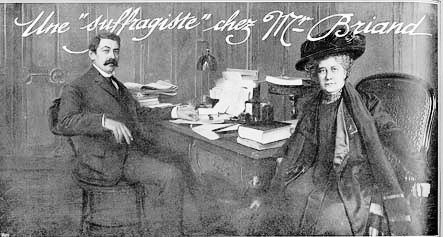
Jeanne Schmahl visiting the French Premier Aristide Briand in 1909

The French Union for Women's Suffrage (UFSF: Union française pour le suffrage des femmes) was founded by a group of feminists who had attended a national congress of French feminists in Paris in 1908. Most of them were from bourgeois or intellectual backgrounds. The leaders were Jeanne Schmahl and Jane Misme. Since 1901 Schmahl had belonged to the Women's Suffrage (Suffrage des femmes) association led by Hubertine Auclert (1848–1914). The UFSF provided a less militant and more widely acceptable alternative to Suffrage des femmes. The sole objective, as published in La Française early in 1909, was to obtain women's suffrage through legal approaches.

The founding meeting of 300 women was held in February 1909. Cécile Brunschvicg (1877–1946) was made secretary-general. Schmahl was the first president. Eliska Vincent accepted the position of honorary vice-president. The UFSF was formally recognized by the International Woman Suffrage Alliance (IWFA) congress in London in April 1909 as representing the French suffrage movement. Although national in scope, the UFSF was very much Paris-based. Schmahl stated that the campaign would be peaceable, and would start by asking for women to be able to vote in municipal elections and sit on municipal councils.

Schmahl resigned from the UFSF in 1911 due to disputes with Cécile Brunschvicg, although the reason given was health problems. She was succeeded as UFSF president first by Eliska Vincent and then by Marguerite de Witt-Schlumberger, Jane Misme stayed with the UFSF, which had 12,000 members by 1914. Jeanne Schmahl died in 1915. Her obituary said,

Mme. Jeanne Schmahl was before her day—a pioneer who did not claim to be a prophetess. She reasoned and persuaded... It was her deliberate intention and in kindness of heart that she wished to improve us [men] by improving the condition of women... She kept her foot on solid earth. She did not forget reality—that was her strength; that and the gentle but firm obstinacy with which she cultivated her garden.

== Selected publications ==
- Jeanne-E. Schmahl (Mme Henri) (1894). La Question de la femme, par Mme Henri Schmahl. May et Motteroz.
- Jeanne-E. Schmahl (Mme Henri) (1895). Le Préjugé de sexe, par Mme Henri Schmahl...
- Jeanne-E. Schmah (1896). L'avenir Du Mariage. l'Avant-Courriere.
- Jeanne-E. Schmahl (September 1896). "Progress of the Women's Rights Movement in France". Forum (22). Philadelphia and New York: 88–89.
- Jeanne E. Schmahl (1898). Deux petits discours: L'historique d'une loi [et] Le foyer français. L'Avant-Courière.
- Jeanne-E. Schmah (1901). Économie domestique. C. Lamy.
- Jeanne E. Schmahl (1905). Raisons biologiques et économiques de l'inégalité de la femme dans le travail. l'Avant-Courrière.

== Sources ==
- Bell, Susan G.; Offen, Karen M. (1983). Women, the Family, and Freedom: 1880–1950. Stanford University Press. p. 98. ISBN 978-0-8047-1173-9.
- Charles, Ernest (1 November 1915). "Obituary: Mme. Jeanne Schmahl". Jus Suffragii. Taylor & Francis. ISBN 978-0-415-25738-1.
- Clark, Linda L. (17 April 2008). Women and Achievement in Nineteenth-Century Europe. Cambridge University Press. ISBN 978-0-521-65098-4.
- Hause, Steven C. (2002). "Union Française Pour Le Suffrage Des Femmes (UFSF)". In Helen Tierney (ed.). Women's Studies Encyclopedia. Greenwood Press.
- McMillan, James (8 January 2002). France and Women, 1789–1914: Gender, Society and Politics. Routledge. p. 194. ISBN 978-1-134-58958-6.
- Metz, Annie (December 2007). "Jeanne Schmahl et la loi sur le libre salaire de la femme". Bulletin du Archives du Féminisme (in French) (13). Archived from the original on 4 May 2019.
- Rappaport, Helen (2001). Encyclopedia of Women Social Reformers. ABC-CLIO. ISBN 978-1-57607-101-4.
- Rudd, Jill; Gough, Val (1 April 1999). Charlotte Perkins Gilman: Optimist Reformer. University of Iowa Press. ISBN 978-1-58729-310-8.
- "Schmahl, Jeanne (1846–1916)". Women in World History: A Biographical Encyclopedia. 1 January 2002.
- Tartakowsky, Danielle (2015). "Les françaises veulent voter". L’Histoire par l’image (in French).
- "The Woman Movement In France and Its Leader". The Brooklyn Daily Eagle. New York. 4 September 1911 – via newspapers.com.
- "What Women Are Doing". The Sun. New York, New York. 12 December 1909 – via newspapers.com.
