= Gottfried von Hagenau =

Medieval priest, physician, theologian and poet from Alsace, France

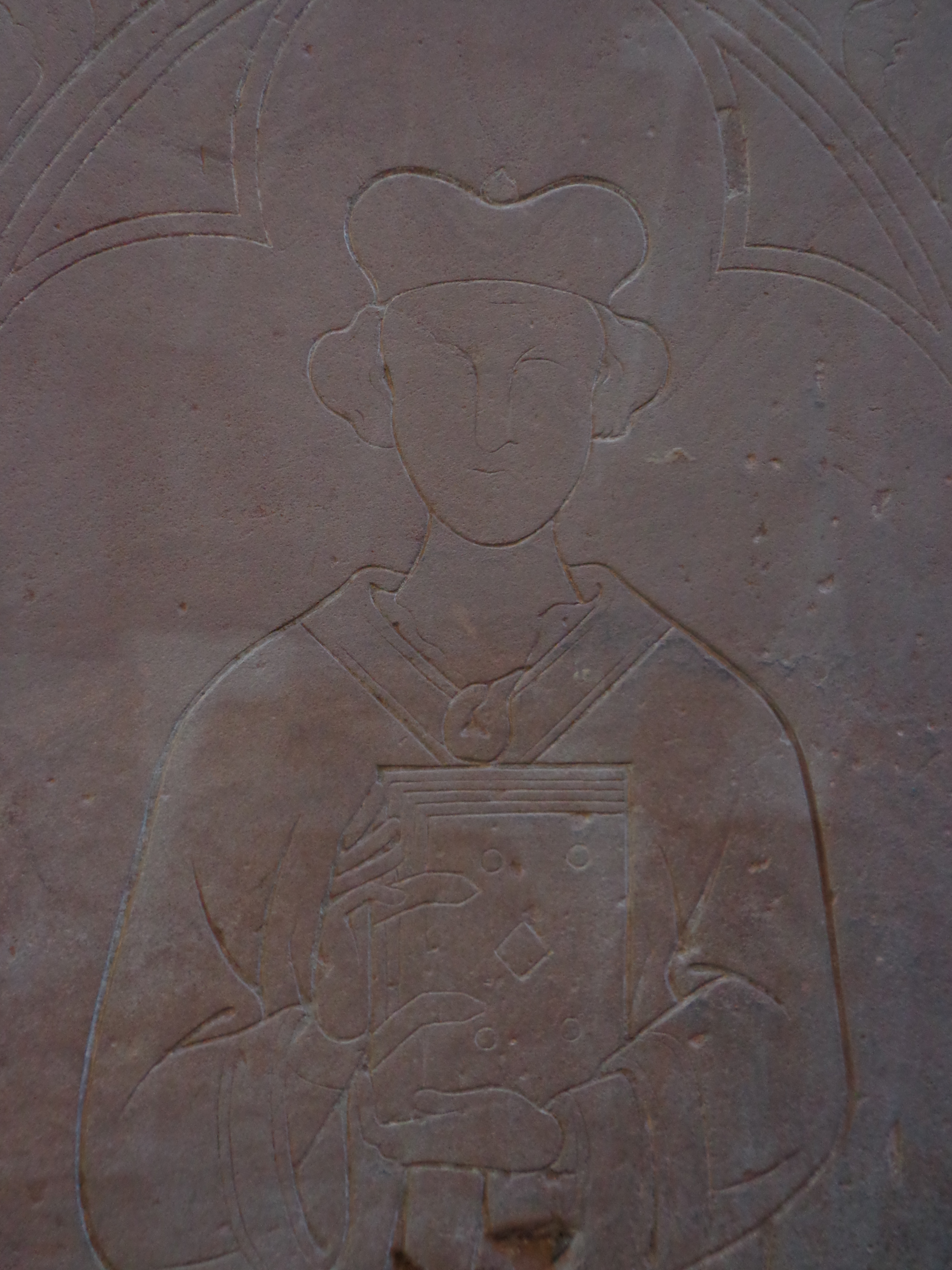
Gottfried von Hagenau

Gottfried von Hagenau (also known as Götz von Hagenau, Gozzo de Hagenowe, Goetz de Haguenau, Godefridus Haguenonensis, and several other names) was a medieval priest, physician, theologian and poet from Alsace. As his name suggests, he was probably born in Haguenau, before 1275.

After having studied medicine and theology in Strasbourg and in Paris, he worked as a headmaster in Basel, Switzerland, before settling as a physician in Strasbourg, where he applied for the post of canon at the St Thomas' Church. He was at first rejected but successfully sued against that decision before the Apostolic Signatura in Rome, and was instated as canon of St Thomas' Church in 1300. He died on 26 September 1313 and is buried in the church, where his ornate Gothic ledger stone is preserved to this day. That monument depicts him in clerical attire and holding a book; the inscription says (the letters in brackets are missing): ANNO D[OMI]NI MCCCXIII VI KA[LENDAS] OCTOBR[IS] O[BIIT] MAG[ISTE]R GOZ[ZO] DE HAGENOWE MEDICUS CANONICUS S[ANCTI] THOME ARG[EN]T[INENSIS].

Gottfried is the author of an epic poem (4,134 rimed verses in Latin) on the life and the feasts of Mary, the Liber [book] sex festorum beatae Virginis (1293–1300), (also known as Carmen [song] sex festorum Beatae Mariae Virginis), dedicated to bishop Conrad of Lichtenberg. The original manuscript of that work has been studied by Johann Michael Moscherosch in 1653. It was unfortunately destroyed, along with the Hortus deliciarum, when the municipal library of Strasbourg was burnt during the Siege of Strasbourg in 1870. The poem is preserved through manuscript copies made in 1861 by Charles Schmidt (1812−1895), and earlier by Jérémie-Jacques Oberlin, and Eberhard Gottlieb Graff; those copies are kept in the National and University Library, and have been edited by the German scholar Volker Schupp.

In 1307, Gottfried introduced the Feast of the Immaculate Conception in the parish of St Thomas' Church, where it was celebrated until the church became Protestant in 1524. He donated his fortune to the parish for this purpose.

== See also ==
- Gottfried von Strassburg
- Reinmar von Hagenau
