= Bellefosse =

- Commune
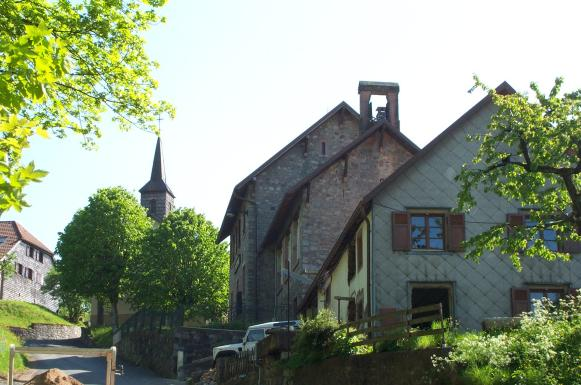
- The town hall and church in Bellefosse

- Coat of arms
- Location of Bellefosse
- Location within France Location within Grand Est
- Coordinates: 48°24′20″N 7°12′57″E
- Country: France
- Region: Grand Est
- Department: Bas-Rhin
- Arrondissement: Molsheim
- Canton: Mutzig

Government
  - Mayor (2020–2026): Alice Morel
- Area^{1}: 7.34 km^{2} (2.83 sq mi)
- Highest elevation: 1,091 m (3,579 ft)
- Lowest elevation: 529 m (1,736 ft)
- Population (2023): 170
  - Density: 23/km^{2} (60/sq mi)
- Time zone: UTC+01:00 (CET)
  - Summer (DST): UTC+02:00 (CEST)
- INSEE/Postal code: 67026 /67130
- ^{1} French Land Register data, which excludes lakes, ponds, glaciers > 1 km^{2} (0.386 sq mi or 247 acres) and river estuaries.

Bellefosse (French pronunciation: [bɛlfos]; German: Schöngrund) is a commune in the Bas-Rhin department in Grand Est in northeastern France, historically and culturally part of Alsace.

== Geography ==
The village is located on a mountain terrace on the west slope of the Champ du Feu in the Bruche Valley. It is dominated by the ruins of the Château de la Roche towering above it.

== Toponymy ==
- 1434: Belfus
- 1534: Belfuss
- 1578: Belfos
- 1584: Belfuß
- 1782: Belfus
- 1793: Bellefosse
- 1915-1918: Schöngrund

Originating from the Celtic words bill (small) and fois (place).

== History ==
Bellefosse is part of the old Ban de la Roche fief. The village's name was formalized as Belfus in 1434. It was composed of 25 houses in 1578, under the name of belfos then.

On 1 April 1974, it fused with Waldersbach and Belmont to form the commune of Ban-de-Roche, in reference to the historical fief, Fouday was added to the commune in 1975. On 1 January 1992, the commune of Bellefosse was reestablished.

=== Coat of arms ===

The heraldics of Bellefosse are blazoned: "Azure with one golden chevron followed by three silver cramps set in pale."

== Population ==
Historical population
Year	Pop.	±% p.a.
1968	109	—
1975	92	−2.39%
1982	87	−0.80%
1990	95	+1.11%
1999	133	+3.81%
2007	128	−0.48%
2012	135	+1.07%
2017	150	+2.13%
2023	170	+2.11%
Source: INSEE

== See also ==
- Communes of the Bas-Rhin department
