= Château de la Roche =

Ruined castle in France

Coordinates: 48°23′46″N 7°13′4″E

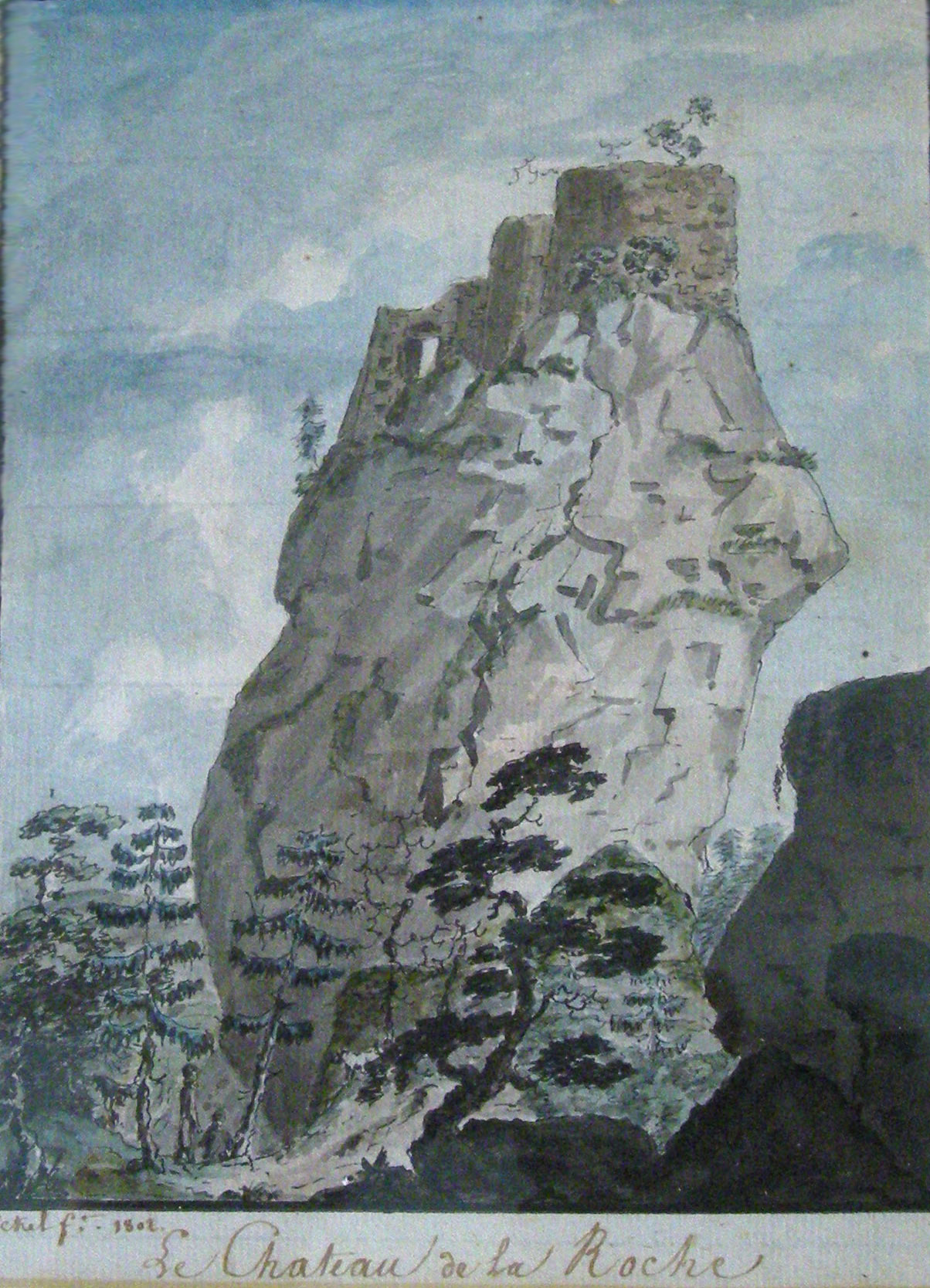

The Château de la Roche is a ruined castle in the commune of Bellefosse in the Bas-Rhin département in Alsace, France. The site was recorded as fortified in 1180, but the present castle ruins are from a later period, most likely from 1284.
