= Ligue pour le relèvement de la moralité publique =

League for the Recovery of Public Morality
- Ligue pour le relèvement de la moralité publique
- Successor: Cartel d'action sociale et morale
- Formation: 1883
- Purpose: Recovery of public morals
- Headquarters: 61 Boulevard Pasteur, Paris, France

The League for the Recovery of Public Morality (French: Ligue pour le relèvement de la moralité publique, LRMP) is a French federation of local associations working for the respect of what it considered "good morals". Created in 1883, by Tommy Fallot, the league supports the abolition of prostitution and is opposed to pornography, alcohol and gambling. Initially the league opposed alcohol and pornography, but after Fallot met with English anti-prostitution activist Josephine Butler, the end of prostitution was added to its aims. It initiated many actions against films before self-dissolving in 1946. The league published a monthly magazine, The Social Recovery, from 1893. In 1946, it succeeded La Rénovation, and reformed as the Cartel d'action sociale et morale (Cartel of social and moral action).

== History ==
The League was founded by people with Protestant views, especially Christian socialism, and often linked to the left wing and the League of Human Rights. Its secretary-general at the end of 19th century was Louis Comte, a Dreyfus pastor. Tommy Fallot and Edmond de Pressensé were prominent members, as was the suffragette Jeanne Schmahl. A number of personalities, including academics, have been members of the league, including Benoît, rector of the University of Montpellier; Vidal, professor of criminal law; Gustave Monod; Paul Bureau, professor at the Institut Catholique de Paris and president of the League from 1906 to 1923 (who succeeded Paul Gemähling, professor of Strasbourg and Jewish denomination); the economist Charles Gide, president of the Société de protestation contre la licence des rues from 1910; the Dean of the Protestant Faculty of Theology in Paris, Raoul Allier and the sociologist Albert Bayet. In the early 1920s, it had several deputies and senators and also a minister, radical-socialist Justin Godart (also deputy then senator of Lyon). In addition, in the 1930s feminist Cécile Brunschvicg, deputy secretary of the Blum government, and Georges Pernot, minister of the Flandin government in 1930 and member of the Republican Federation (center-right).

The league moved more and more to the right after the First World War, until under Émile Pourésy (author of La gangrène pornographique (The Pornographic Gangrene) (1908) becoming Petainist in 1940. The league, however, did not accept the endorsement of brothels by Vichy. Re-established under the name of the Cartel d'action sociale et morale after the war, it obtained, thanks to the deputies of the Mouvement républicain populaire (MRP), the passing of two important laws, the Loi Marthe Richard abolishing the brothels, and the law of July 16, 1949 on publications aimed at young people.

== Prostitution and pornography ==
In terms of prostitution, the league particularly opposed the Société de protestation contre la licence des rues, led by the "Father modesty", René Bérenger, who wanted to deregulate prostitution and brothels. The fight against "pornography" covers a broad spectrum; it tries to convince the railway companies to repaint the walls of the toilets more often in order to erase obscene graffiti. Émile Pourésy and the league often oppose La Vie Parisienne. Although formed mostly of bourgeois, the league is difficult to classify on a political level. E. Pourésy addresses the Action Française League, by invitation, who see him as a defender of neo-Malthusianism. At the third congress of the movement, in 1905, the philosophy professor Edmond Goblot accused the bourgeoisie as being the cause of prostitution.

== Lyon Section ==
The LRMP had a very active local branch in Lyon. The branch protested the presence of swimmers near the Quai Saint-Vincent and the showing of the 1923 film La Garçonne. This prompts a police investigation of mayor Édouard Herriot, which concludes there has been no wrongdoings. (La Garçonne was, however, prohibited from broadcasting in Lyon, in 1941, under Vichy). The local did however obtain the prohibition in 1933 of La Marche au Soleil, a film about the nudism in France. In 1936, it mounted a campaign, along with members of the La Cagoule (an illegal underground organization), against Abel Gance's film Lucrezia Borgia. The film was banned by Georges Cohendy, the president of the special delegation of Lyon under Vichy in November 1940.

== Le Cartel d'action sociale et morale ==
In 1946, the League was re-formed as Le Cartel d'action sociale et morale (the Cartel of Social and Moral Action). It was directed by Daniel Parker, who sued Boris Vian over the novel I Spit on Your Graves. Among its members were Maurice Leenhardt, professor at the École pratique des hautes études; Canon Viollet (a former member of the Resistance); physician Édouard Rist; André Mignot, congressman, leader of the MRP and mayor of Versailles and Charles Richard-Molard, General Delegate of the Cartel. The Loi Marthe Richard, which led to the closing of brothels, was proposed by MRP congressman Pierre Dominjon, a member of the Cartel. Dominjon also pushed through the vote of the law of July 16, 1949 on publications intended for the youth. Daniel Parker was sidelined after Gaston Gallimard discovered, by use of a private detective, his taste for underage boys; André Mignot succeeded him.
