= Jérémie-Jacques Oberlin =

Alsatian philologist and archaeologist (1735–1806)

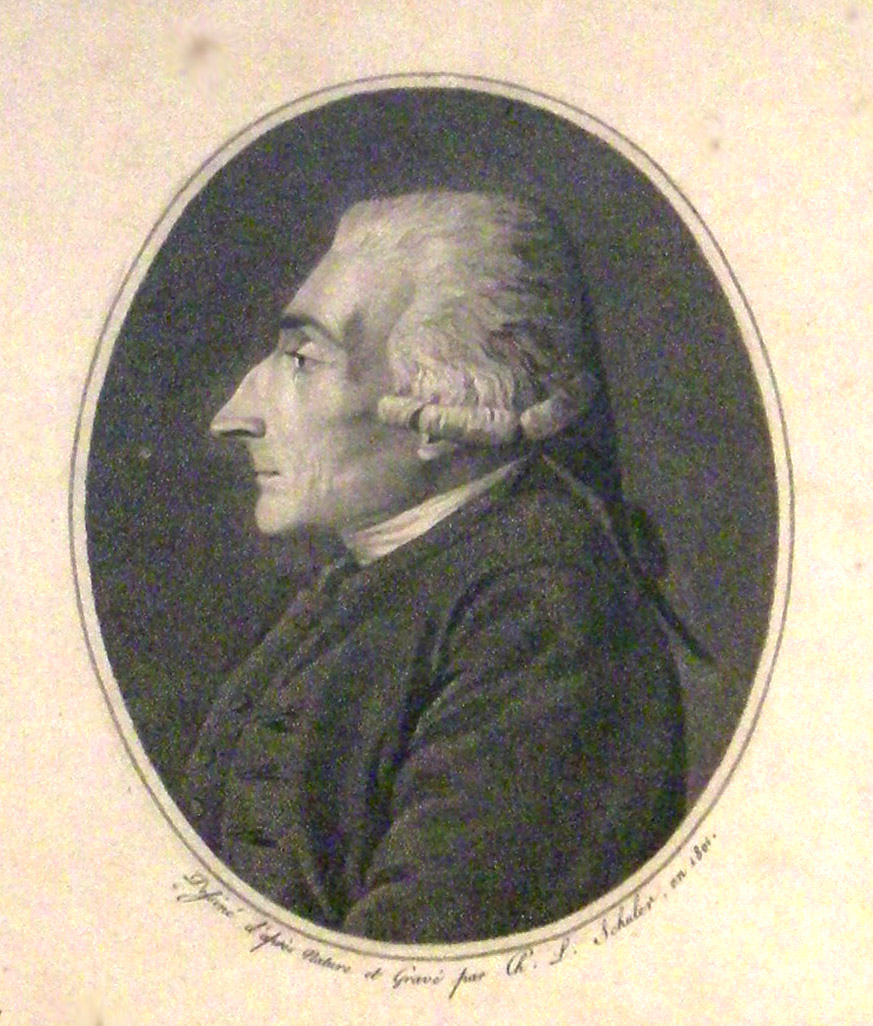
Jérémie Jacques Oberlin.

Jérémie-Jacques Oberlin (8 August 1735 – 10 October 1806) was a philologist and archaeologist from Alsace. He was also known as Jeremias Jakob Oberlin in German.

The brother of Jean Frédéric Oberlin, he was born at Strasbourg. While studying theology at the university he devoted special attention to Biblical archaeology. In 1755 he was chosen professor at the gymnasium of his native town, in 1763 librarian to the university, in 1770 professor of rhetoric, and in 1782 of logic and metaphysics.

Oberlin published several manuals on archaeology and ancient geography, and made frequent excursions into different provinces of France to investigate antiquarian remains and study provincial dialects, the result appearing in Essai sur le patois Lorrain (1775); Dissertations sur les Minnesingers (1782–1789); and Observations concernant le patois et les mœurs des gens de la campagne (1791). He also published several editions of Latin authors and copied manuscripts by Gottfried von Hagenau, the originals of which are now lost.
