= J. F. Oberlin =

Alsatian pastor and philanthropist (1740–1826)

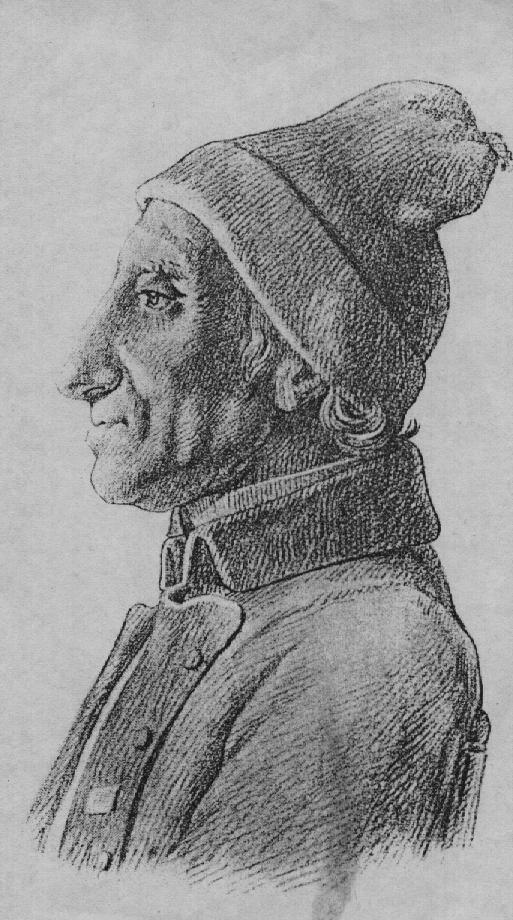
- Born: Johann Friedrich Oberlin; 31 August 1740; Strasbourg, France
- Died: 1 June 1826 (aged 85); Waldersbach, Bas-Rhin, France

J. F. Oberlin (31 August 1740 – 1 June 1826) was an Alsatian pastor and a philanthropist. He has been known as John Frederic(k) Oberlin in English, Jean-Frédéric Oberlin in French, and Johann Friedrich Oberlin in German.

== Life ==
Oberlin was born the son of Johann Georg Oberlin (1701–1770), a teacher, and Maria Magdalena (1718–1787), daughter of lawyer Johann Heinrich Feltz, on 31 August 1740 in the German-speaking city of Strasbourg, where he studied theology. In 1766 he became Protestant pastor of Waldbach (now Waldersbach), a remote and barren region in the Steinthal (Ban de la Roche/Steintal), a valley in the Vosges on the borders of Alsace and Lorraine.

Oberlin set out to improve both the material and the spiritual condition of the inhabitants. He began by encouraging the construction of roads through the valley and the erection of bridges, rallying the peasantry to the enterprise by his personal example. He introduced an improved system of agriculture. Substantial cottages were erected, and various industrial arts were introduced. He founded an itinerant library, originated infant schools (precursors of the modern nursery schools of France) and established an ordinary school at each of the five villages in the parish. In the work of education he received great assistance from his housekeeper, Louisa Scheppler (1763–1837). He practiced medicine among them, founded a savings and loan bank and introduced cotton manufacturing.

Beside all this Oberlin was a man of rare spirituality, being frequently styled "a saint of the Protestant church", and an excellent pastor, who preached each month three sermons in French and one in German. In 1812 Daniel Legrand visited the Steinthal (Ban de la Roche), where he met Oberlin, who lived in Waldersbach. Legrand came under the spell of the pastor, and moved with his ribbon factory to the village of Urbach in the vicinity of Waldersbach, where he lived for the rest of his life.

Oberlin died at Waldersbach on 1 June 1826 and was interred with great manifestations of honor and affection at Urbach (now Fouday, Bas Rhin).

== Legacy ==
Oberlin has been called the "true precursor of social Christianity in France". Daniel Legrand's grandson was Tommy Fallot, founder of "Christianisme social". Legrand and Robert Owen (1771–1853) of Wales, another industrialist, advocated creation of an international organization dedicated to reform of labor laws. Oberlin's orphan asylums were the beginning of the many "Oberlinvereine" for the protection of children, such as in Leonberg, Potsdam and Worms.

Oberlin, Ohio, founded as a Christian settlement, and its centerpiece, Oberlin College, a liberal arts college, were named for him upon their founding in 1833. J. F. Oberlin University in Tokyo, Japan, which was named for Oberlin College, also bears his name. Oberlin, Louisiana, was also named after him.

His brother Jérémie Jacques Oberlin was a noted archaeologist and philologist.

== Sources ==
- Chalamet, Christophe (16 January 2013). Revivalism and Social Christianity: The Prophetic Faith of Henri Nick and Andre Trocme. Wipf and Stock Publishers. ISBN 978-1-61097-858-3.
- Dankers, Cora (2003). "2.2 Labour Standards and Social Accountability". ENVIRONMENTAL AND SOCIAL STANDARDS, CERTIFICATION AND LABELLING FOR CASH CROPS (PDF). Rome: Food and Agriculture Organization of the United Nations.
- De Felice, Professor (1859). "Daniel Legrand, The Philanthropist of France". The Christian guest, revised by N. Macleod.
- Rines, George Edwin, ed. (1920). "Oberlin, Jean Frédéric" . Encyclopedia Americana. Vol. XX.
- This article incorporates text from a publication now in the public domain: Chisholm, Hugh, ed. (1911). "Oberlin, Jean Frédéric". Encyclopædia Britannica. Vol. 19 (11th ed.). Cambridge University Press. p. 946.
