= Rothau =

- Commune
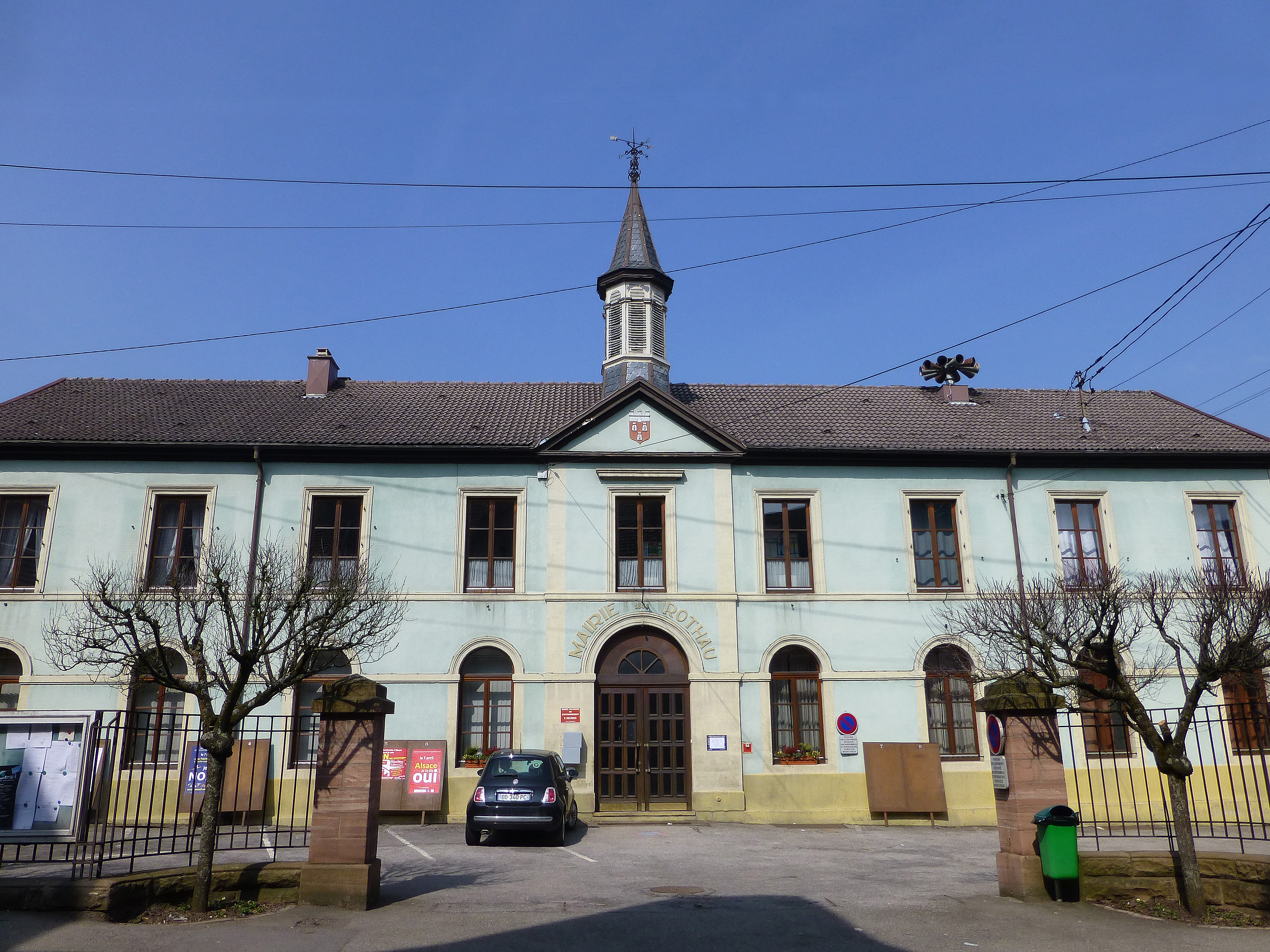
- The town hall in Rothau

- Coat of arms
- Location of Rothau
- Location within France Location within Grand Est
- Coordinates: 48°27′20″N 7°12′33″E
- Country: France
- Region: Grand Est
- Department: Bas-Rhin
- Arrondissement: Molsheim
- Canton: Mutzig

Government
  - Mayor (2020–2026): Marc Scheer
- Area^{1}: 3.88 km^{2} (1.50 sq mi)
- Highest elevation: 690 m (2,260 ft)
- Lowest elevation: 319 m (1,047 ft)
- Population (2023): 1,471
  - Density: 379/km^{2} (982/sq mi)
- Time zone: UTC+01:00 (CET)
  - Summer (DST): UTC+02:00 (CEST)
- INSEE/Postal code: 67414 /67570
- ^{1} French Land Register data, which excludes lakes, ponds, glaciers > 1 km^{2} (0.386 sq mi or 247 acres) and river estuaries.

Rothau (French pronunciation: [ʁɔto]) is a commune in the Bas-Rhin department in Grand Est in north-eastern France.

== See also ==
- Communes of the Bas-Rhin department
