= Neuviller-la-Roche =

- Commune
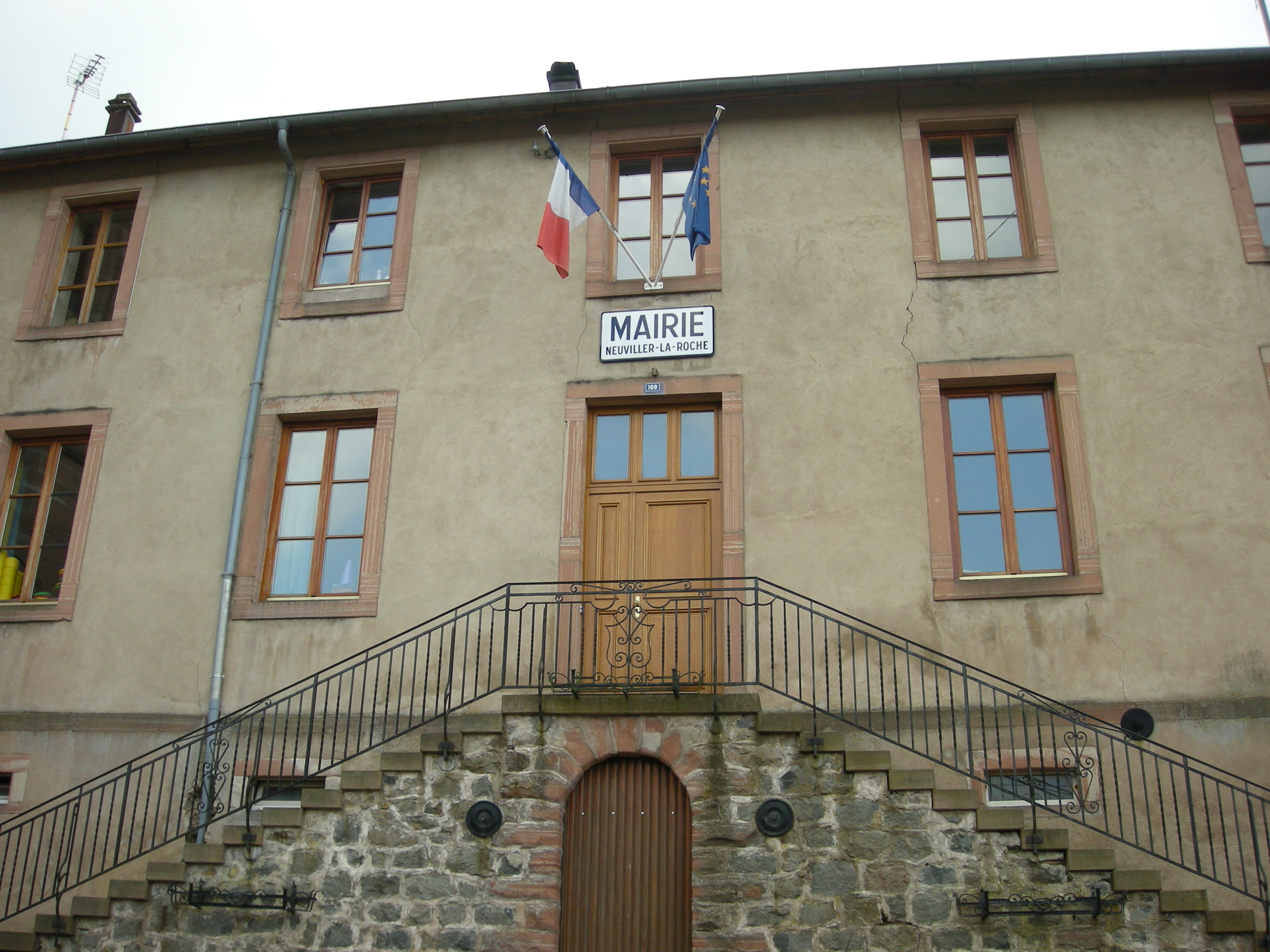
- The town hall in Neuviller-la-Roche

- Coat of arms
- Location of Neuviller-la-Roche
- Location within France Location within Grand Est
- Coordinates: 48°26′23″N 7°14′23″E
- Country: France
- Region: Grand Est
- Department: Bas-Rhin
- Arrondissement: Molsheim
- Canton: Mutzig

Government
  - Mayor (2020–2026): André Wolff
- Area^{1}: 9.19 km^{2} (3.55 sq mi)
- Highest elevation: 1,035 m (3,396 ft)
- Lowest elevation: 410 m (1,350 ft)
- Population (2023): 333
  - Density: 36.2/km^{2} (93.8/sq mi)
- Time zone: UTC+01:00 (CET)
  - Summer (DST): UTC+02:00 (CEST)
- INSEE/Postal code: 67321 /67130
- ^{1} French Land Register data, which excludes lakes, ponds, glaciers > 1 km^{2} (0.386 sq mi or 247 acres) and river estuaries.

Neuviller-la-Roche (French pronunciation: [nøvilɛʁ la ʁɔʃ]; German: Neuweiler) is a commune in the Bas-Rhin department in Grand Est in north-eastern France.

== See also ==
- Communes of the Bas-Rhin department
