= Fouday =

- Commune
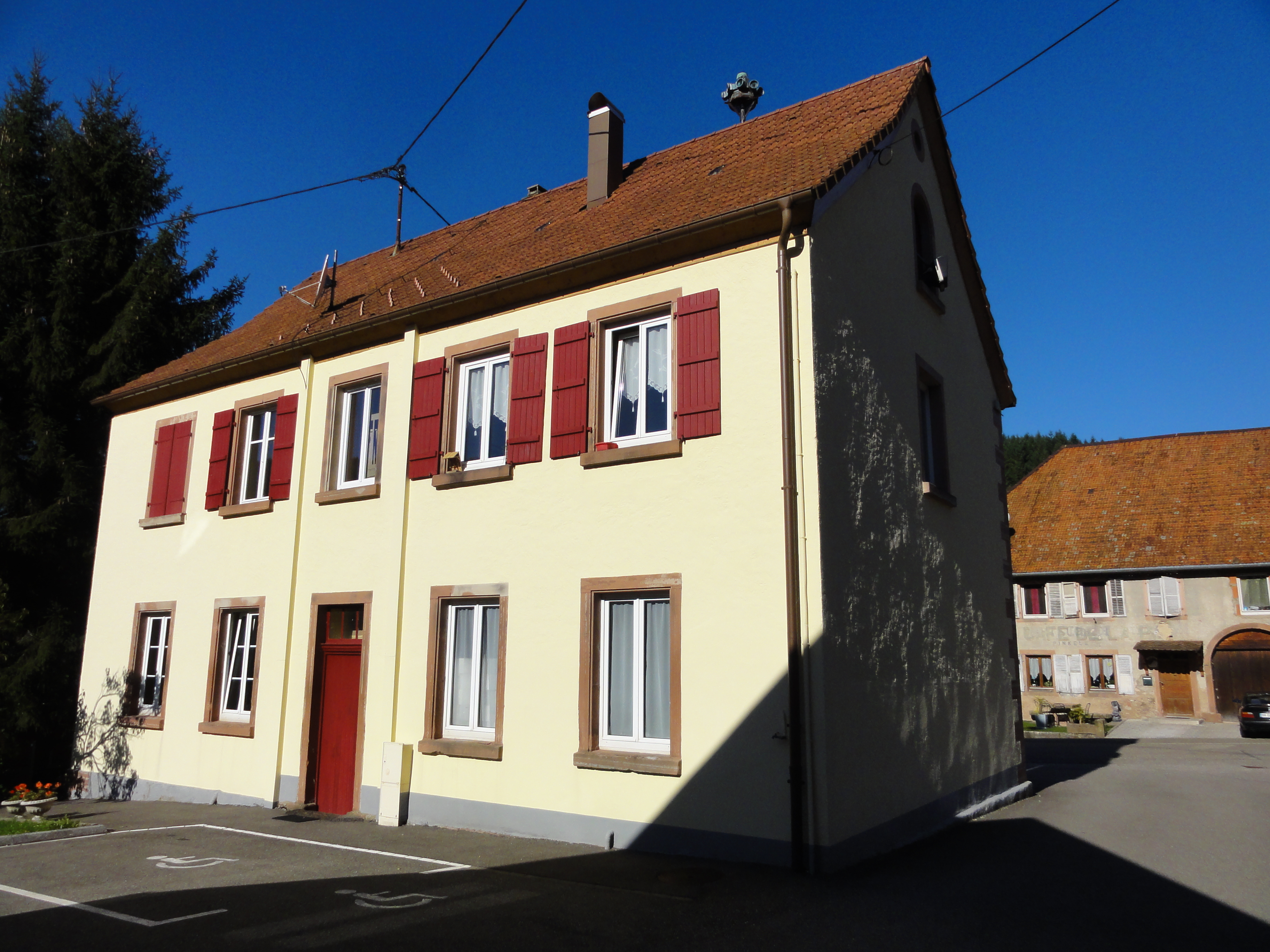
- The town hall in Fouday

- Coat of arms
- Location of Fouday
- Location within France Location within Grand Est
- Coordinates: 48°25′18″N 7°11′12″E
- Country: France
- Region: Grand Est
- Department: Bas-Rhin
- Arrondissement: Molsheim
- Canton: Mutzig
- Intercommunality: CC de la Vallée de la Bruche

Government
  - Mayor (2020–2026): Maurice Guidat
- Area^{1}: 2.05 km^{2} (0.79 sq mi)
- Highest elevation: 680 m (2,230 ft)
- Lowest elevation: 380 m (1,250 ft)
- Population (2023): 333
  - Density: 162/km^{2} (421/sq mi)
- Time zone: UTC+01:00 (CET)
  - Summer (DST): UTC+02:00 (CEST)
- INSEE/Postal code: 67144 /67130
- ^{1} French Land Register data, which excludes lakes, ponds, glaciers > 1 km^{2} (0.386 sq mi or 247 acres) and river estuaries.

Fouday (French pronunciation: [fudɛ]; German: Urbach; Alsatian: Fouda) is a commune in the Bas-Rhin department in Grand Est in north-eastern France.

At the start of 1975 Fouday was merged with the neighboring settlements of Waldersbach, Belmont and Bellefosse: the resulting aggregation was called Ban-de-la-Roche, recalling the historical territory Ban de la Roche. The Vosgean mountain village recovered its independence at the start of 1992; it has been incorporated into various administrative structures in recent decades and is currently one of 26 communes included in the Communauté de communes de la Vallée de la Bruche.

== Geography ==
Fouday lies in the Bruche valley, on the right bank, at the river's confluence with the little river Chirgoutte (or Schirgoutte) surrounded by pastures and forests, and dominated by Mont Saint-Jean.

The village is served by the National Road (Route nationale) 420 which connects Strasbourg with Saint-Dié. The town is also traversed by the railway line - here just a single track - that connects these two urban centres. The mountain topography of the region keeps the road and railway running in close parallel along the Bruche Valley.

== History ==
Fouday was part of the ancient lordship of Ban de la Roche along with the surrounding settlements of Waldersbach, Solbach, Belmont and Bellefosse.

The first surviving written record of the village dates from the fourteenth century, when it appeared in the records as Urbach. However, the village clearly existed by the end of the twelfth century, since the church building dates from that time.

During the late medieval period, the village church was a stage along the pilgrim route to Mont Sainte-Odile in Lorraine across the Vosges Mountains to the west. Evidence for this comes from the fifteenth century depiction of St. James in the old choir of the church. The church also contains a carved head of John the Baptist recalling the Baptist's demise: the carved head is the subject of a local pilgrimage tradition which still survives.

Despite the endurance of the pilgrimage tradition, the village joined the Protestant Reformation at the time of Pastor Marmet during the 1570s. Effectively all the villages within the Ban de la Roche became Protestant when the lands were sold by the Rathsamhausen family to the German Count Palatine, George John of Veldenz in the sixteenth century.

The village was the birthplace of Tommy Fallot (1844–1904), a Lutheran pastor who is considered the founder of Social Christianity in France.

== See also ==
- Communes of the Bas-Rhin department
