= Wildersbach =

- Commune
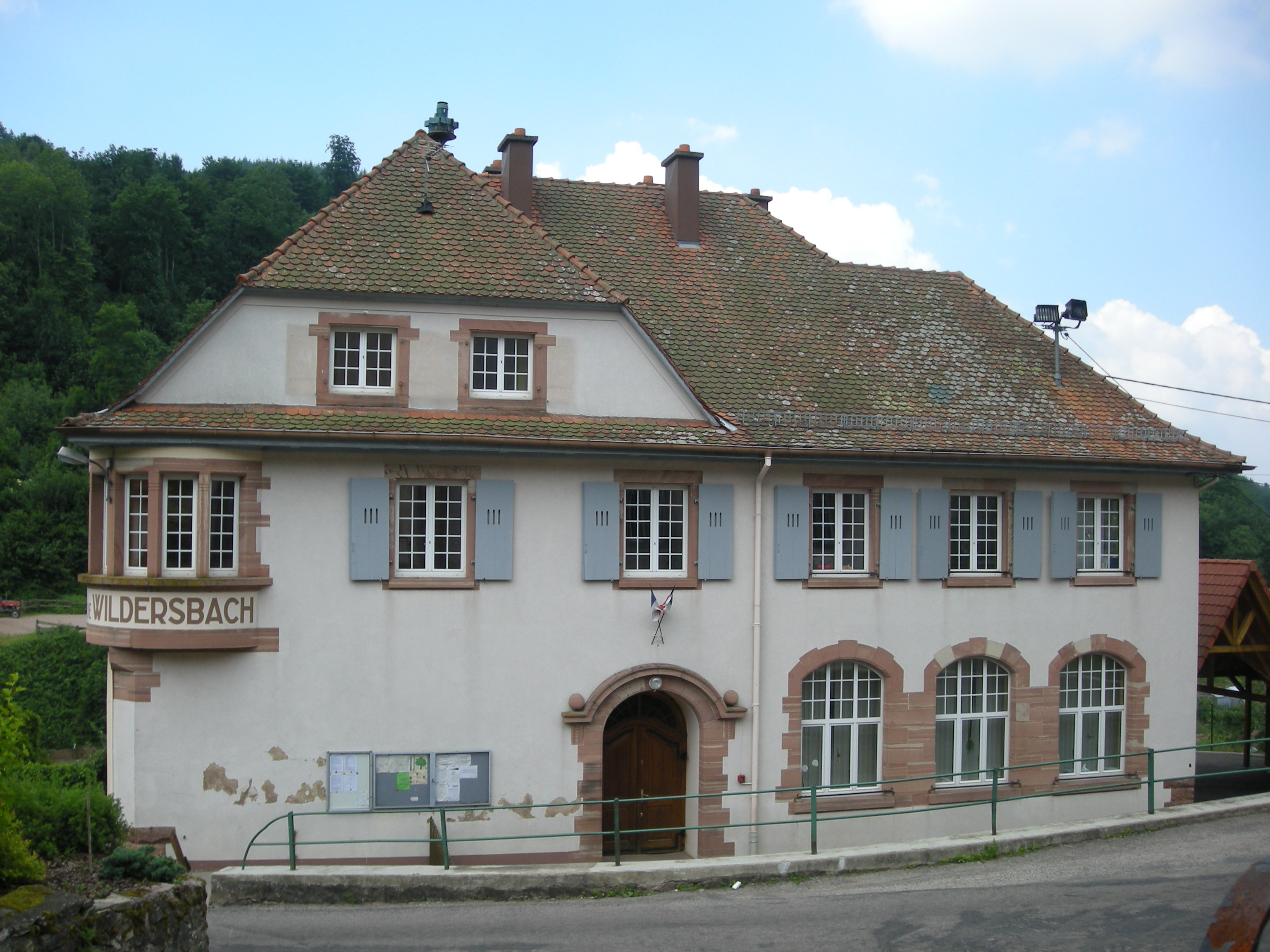
- The town hall in Wildersbach

- Coat of arms
- Location of Wildersbach
- Location within France Location within Grand Est
- Coordinates: 48°26′16″N 7°13′26″E
- Country: France
- Region: Grand Est
- Department: Bas-Rhin
- Arrondissement: Molsheim
- Canton: Mutzig
- Intercommunality: Vallée de la Bruche

Government
  - Mayor (2020–2026): Jacques Michel
- Area^{1}: 3.3 km^{2} (1.3 sq mi)
- Highest elevation: 850 m (2,790 ft)
- Lowest elevation: 390 m (1,280 ft)
- Population (2023): 284
  - Density: 86/km^{2} (220/sq mi)
- Time zone: UTC+01:00 (CET)
  - Summer (DST): UTC+02:00 (CEST)
- INSEE/Postal code: 67531 /67130
- ^{1} French Land Register data, which excludes lakes, ponds, glaciers > 1 km^{2} (0.386 sq mi or 247 acres) and river estuaries.

Wildersbach is a commune in the Bas-Rhin department in Grand Est in north-eastern France.

== Population ==
Historical population
Year	Pop.	±% p.a.
1968	292	—
1975	265	−1.38%
1982	264	−0.05%
1990	260	−0.19%
1999	282	+0.91%
2007	318	+1.51%
2012	311	−0.44%
2017	291	−1.32%
2023	284	−0.40%
Source: INSEE

== See also ==
- Communes of the Bas-Rhin department
