= Belmont, Bas-Rhin =

Belmont
- Commune
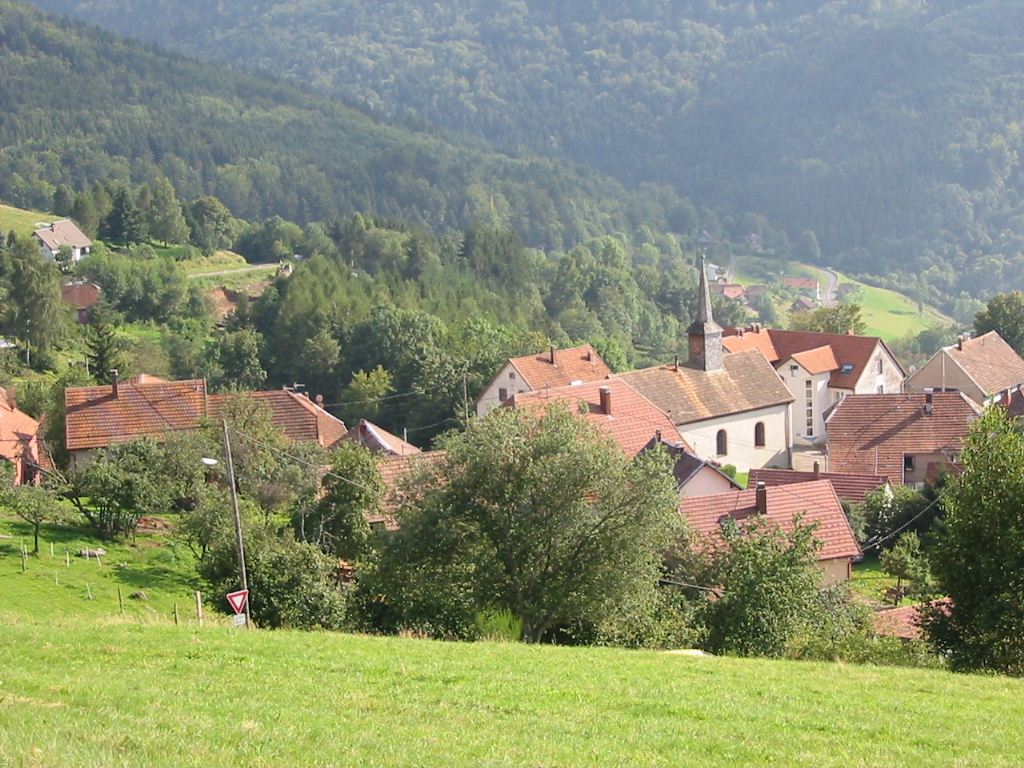
- A general view of Belmont

- Coat of arms
- Location of Belmont
- Location within France Location within Grand Est
- Coordinates: 48°24′38″N 7°14′07″E
- Country: France
- Region: Grand Est
- Department: Bas-Rhin
- Arrondissement: Molsheim
- Canton: Mutzig

Government
  - Mayor (2020–2026): Guy Hazemann
- Area^{1}: 10.34 km^{2} (3.99 sq mi)
- Highest elevation: 1,084 m (3,556 ft)
- Lowest elevation: 566 m (1,857 ft)
- Population (2023): 169
  - Density: 16.3/km^{2} (42.3/sq mi)
- Time zone: UTC+01:00 (CET)
  - Summer (DST): UTC+02:00 (CEST)
- INSEE/Postal code: 67027 /67130
- ^{1} French Land Register data, which excludes lakes, ponds, glaciers > 1 km^{2} (0.386 sq mi or 247 acres) and river estuaries.

Belmont (French pronunciation: [bɛlmɔ̃]; German: Schönenberg) is a commune in the Bas-Rhin department in Grand Est in northeastern France.

== Climate ==
Climate data for Belmont, 1065m (1991−2020 normals)
Month	Jan	Feb	Mar	Apr	May	Jun	Jul	Aug	Sep	Oct	Nov	Dec	Year
Mean daily maximum °C (°F)	1.1 (34.0)	1.2 (34.2)	4.9 (40.8)	10.3 (50.5)	13.2 (55.8)	16.8 (62.2)	18.8 (65.8)	18.3 (64.9)	14.7 (58.5)	10.3 (50.5)	6.0 (42.8)	2.6 (36.7)	9.9 (49.7)
Daily mean °C (°F)	−1 (30)	−1 (30)	2.2 (36.0)	6.9 (44.4)	9.8 (49.6)	13.3 (55.9)	15.3 (59.5)	15.0 (59.0)	11.6 (52.9)	7.8 (46.0)	3.7 (38.7)	0.4 (32.7)	7.0 (44.6)
Mean daily minimum °C (°F)	−3.2 (26.2)	−3.3 (26.1)	−0.5 (31.1)	3.5 (38.3)	6.4 (43.5)	9.9 (49.8)	11.8 (53.2)	11.7 (53.1)	8.8 (47.8)	5.2 (41.4)	1.4 (34.5)	−1.7 (28.9)	4.2 (39.5)
Average precipitation mm (inches)	138.6 (5.46)	107.4 (4.23)	106.3 (4.19)	65.2 (2.57)	125.7 (4.95)	114.5 (4.51)	101.5 (4.00)	116.2 (4.57)	85.8 (3.38)	115.3 (4.54)	118.2 (4.65)	147.2 (5.80)	1,341.9 (52.85)
Source: Météo-France

== Population ==
Historical population
Year	Pop.	±% p.a.
1968	158	—
1975	134	−2.33%
1982	125	−0.99%
1990	137	+1.15%
1999	147	+0.79%
2007	162	+1.22%
2012	174	+1.44%
2017	167	−0.82%
2023	169	+0.20%
Source: INSEE

== See also ==
- Communes of the Bas-Rhin department
