= Waldersbach =

- Commune
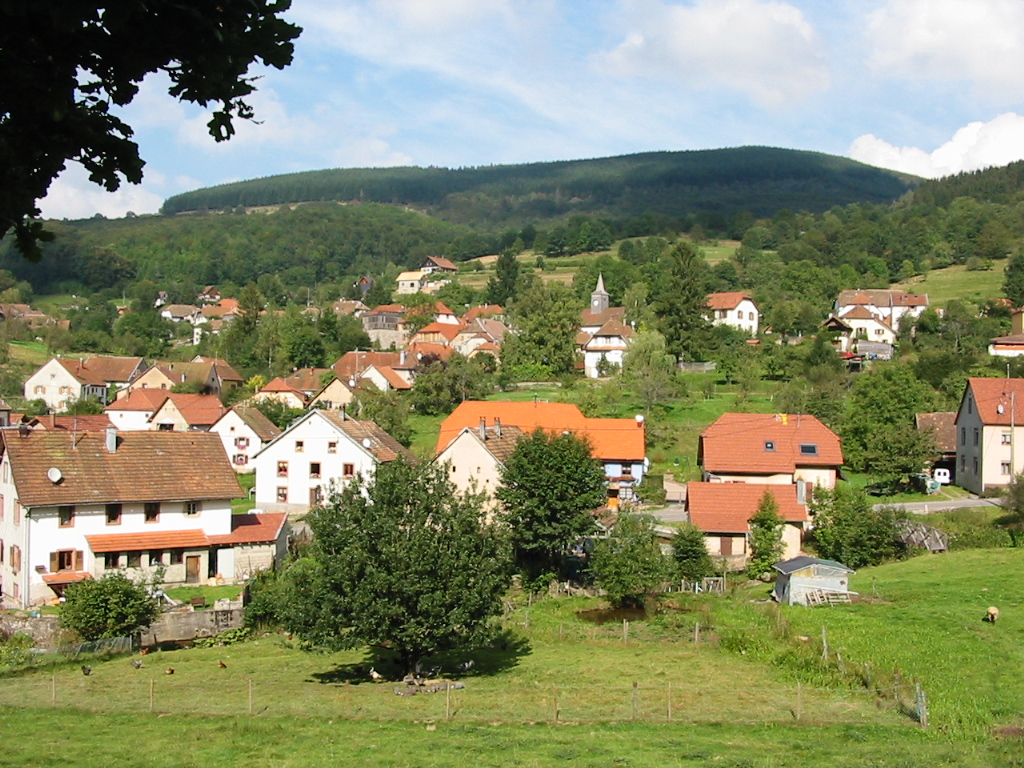
- A general view of Waldersbach

- Coat of arms
- Location of Waldersbach
- Location within France Location within Grand Est
- Coordinates: 48°24′55″N 7°12′51″E
- Country: France
- Region: Grand Est
- Department: Bas-Rhin
- Arrondissement: Molsheim
- Canton: Mutzig
- Intercommunality: Vallée de la Bruche

Government
  - Mayor (2020–2026): Pierre Reymann
- Area^{1}: 3.37 km^{2} (1.30 sq mi)
- Highest elevation: 925 m (3,035 ft)
- Lowest elevation: 464 m (1,522 ft)
- Population (2023): 118
  - Density: 35.0/km^{2} (90.7/sq mi)
- Time zone: UTC+01:00 (CET)
  - Summer (DST): UTC+02:00 (CEST)
- INSEE/Postal code: 67513 /67130
- ^{1} French Land Register data, which excludes lakes, ponds, glaciers > 1 km^{2} (0.386 sq mi or 247 acres) and river estuaries.

Waldersbach is a commune in the Bas-Rhin department in Grand Est in north-eastern France.

== Population ==
Historical population
Year	Pop.	±% p.a.
1968	155	—
1975	131	−2.37%
1982	120	−1.25%
1990	123	+0.31%
1999	139	+1.37%
2007	138	−0.09%
2012	148	+1.41%
2017	131	−2.41%
2023	118	−1.73%
Source: INSEE

== People ==
- Jean-Frédéric Oberlin lived here until his death in 1820.
- Anne Knight, an early British feminist and abolitionist, died here in 1862.

== See also ==
- Communes of the Bas-Rhin department
