= Inter-Allied Women's Conference =

1919 international conference

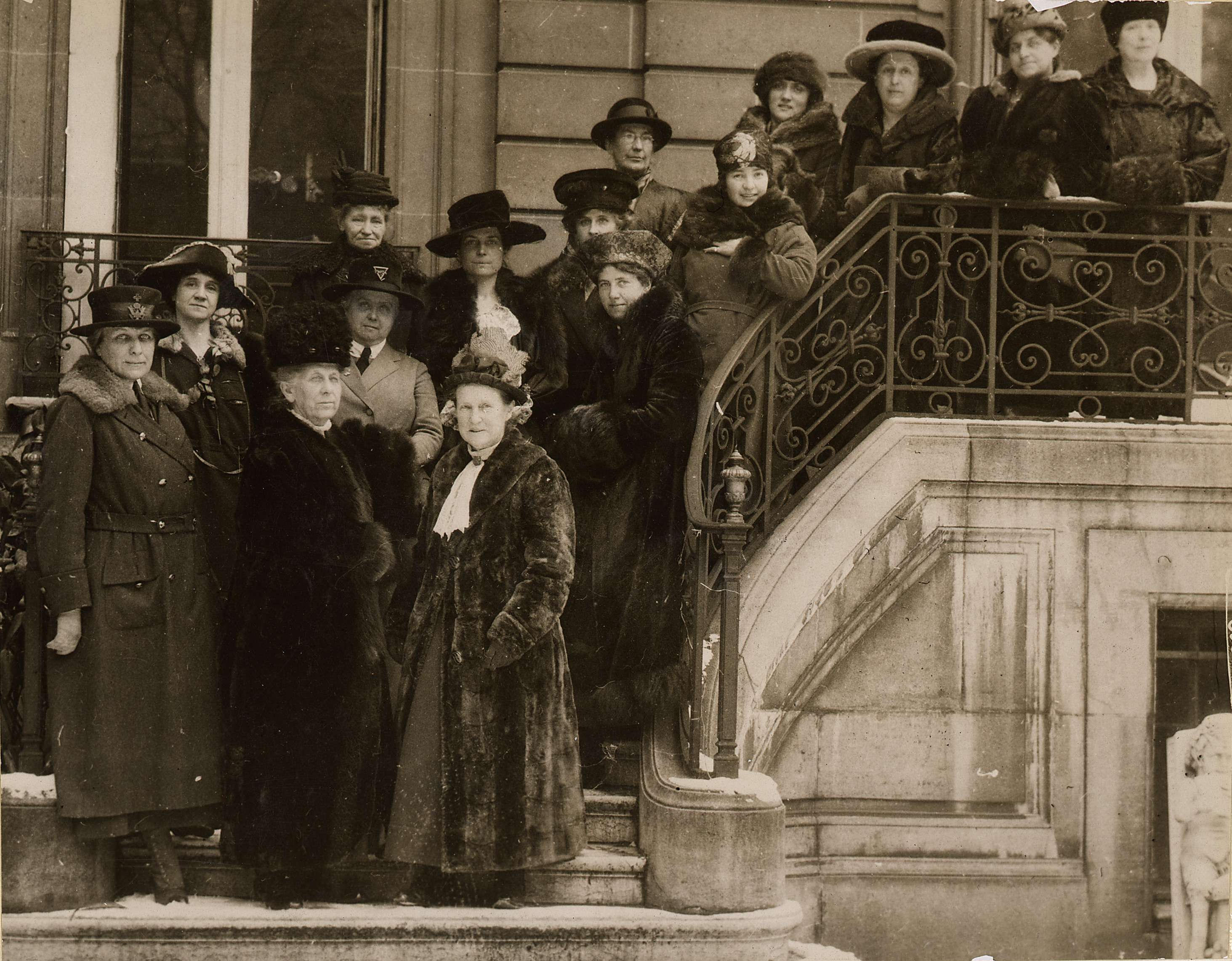
Inter-Allied Women's Conference participants in February: First row, left to right: Florence Jaffray Harriman (US); Marguerite de Witt-Schlumberger (France); Marguerite Pichon-Landry (France). Second row: Juliet Barrett Rublee (US); Katharine Bement Davis (US), Cécile Brunschvicg (France). Third row: Millicent Garrett Fawcett (UK); Ray Strachey (UK); Rosamond Smith (UK). Fourth row: Jane Brigode (Belgium); Marie Parent (Belgium). Fifth row: Nina Boyle (South Africa); Louise van den Plas (Belgium). Sixth row: Graziella Sonnino Carpi (Italy); Eva Mitzhouma (Poland)

The Inter-Allied Women's Conference (also known as the Suffragist Conference of the Allied Countries and the United States) (Note: Some "official" reports refer to the conference as the Suffragist Conference of the Allied Countries and the United States (US).) opened in Paris on 10 February 1919. It was convened parallel to the Paris Peace Conference to introduce women's issues to the peace process after the First World War. Leaders in the international women's suffrage movement had been denied the opportunity to participate in the official proceedings several times before being allowed to make a presentation before the Commission on International Labour Legislation. On 10 April, women were finally allowed to present a resolution to the League of Nations Commission. It covered the trafficking and sale of women and children, their political and suffrage status, and the transformation of education to include the human rights of all persons in each nation.

Though the women involved failed to achieve many of their aims, their efforts marked the first time that women were allowed to participate formally in an international treaty negotiation. They were successful in gaining the right for women to serve in the League of Nations in all capacities, whether as staff or delegates; and in gaining adoption of their provisions for humane labour conditions and the prevention of trafficking. The fact that the women were allowed to participate in the formal peace conference validated women's ability to take part in international policy-making and globalised the discussion of human rights.

== Background ==
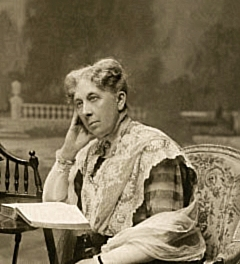
Marguerite de Witt-Schlumberger, conference organiser

The consequences of the First World War were profound: four empires fell; numerous countries were created or regained independence; and significant changes were made to the political, cultural, economic, and social climate of the world. The Paris Peace Conference of 1919 was the initial forum for establishing the terms of peace; it was by design a global conference with representation from 33 nations, concerned with a broad mandate extending to the establishment of a new international community based on moral and legal principles. As such, it called on non-governmental organisations (NGOs) to assist in its work. It was the focus of NGO and lobby groups eager to advance their agendas by vigorous advocacy.

Initially, the Peace Conference organisers had planned to draw up the treaties based on the plenary sessions. The need for restoring stability, secrecy, and speedy progress, however, prevented the public sessions from doing so. Instead, the meetings of the Supreme Council, headed by the Prime Minister and foreign minister of each of the Principal Powers—United Kingdom (UK), France, Italy, Japan, and the US—served as the negotiation sessions for delegates in attendance. Fifty-two separate commissions, and numerous committees, made up of diplomats, policy experts, and other specialists, framed the articles of the various treaties and presented them as recommendations to the Supreme Council. Among the varied commissions were the Commission on Labour Questions, and the League of Nations Commission, which would eventually agree to meet with the women's delegates.

As world leaders gathered for negotiations to draft peace terms after the armistices, Marguerite de Witt-Schlumberger—vice-president of the International Woman Suffrage Alliance and president of the auxiliary organisation, the French Union for Women's Suffrage—wrote a letter dated 18 January 1919 to the US President, Woodrow Wilson, urging him to allow women to participate in the discussions that would inform the treaty negotiations and policy making. Concerned with war crimes committed against women and the lack of any formal outlet for women's political agency, French suffragists wrote to Wilson again on 25 January. They stressed that because some women had fought alongside men, and many women had provided support for men in the war, women's issues should be addressed at the conference. Though Wilson acknowledged their participation and sacrifices, he refused to grant women an official role in the peace process, arguing that their concerns were outside the scope of discussions and that conference delegates were not in a position to tell governments how to manage their internal affairs.

A delegation of 80 French women led by Valentine Thomson, editor of La Vie Feminine and daughter of former cabinet minister Gaston Thomson, met with President Wilson on 1 February at Villa Murat to press for their inclusion in the deliberations of the peace conference. His response was similar to his previous stance that employment issues might be discussed, but women's civil and political rights were domestic issues. During the Labour and Socialist International Conference held in Bern, Switzerland, between 3 and 8 February, women participants from the International Women's Committee of Permanent Peace had held a special meeting organised by Rosika Schwimmer, the Hungarian ambassador to Switzerland and founder of the Hungarian Feminist Association. The delegates at the Bern conference resolved that they would support a democratically formed League of Nations and women's participation in the Paris Peace Conference.

In response, women from the French Union for Women's Suffrage and the National Council of French Women, acting under the leadership of de Witt-Schlumberger, invited international colleagues to meet in Paris in a parallel conference scheduled to open on 10 February. They sent invitations to organisations involved in the suffrage movement in all Allied nations, asking for delegates to participate in a women's conference to present their views and concerns to the delegates of the "official" conference. In parallel, the French feminists worked to persuade the male delegates to support the women's involvement, as they were convinced that international co-operation and co-ordination were required to solve domestic socio-economic problems. The women who responded to the call to participate as delegates or to bring information about conditions in their countries included representatives from France, Italy, the UK, and the US, as well as Armenia, Belgium, New Zealand, Poland, Romania, and South Africa.

== Actions ==
=== February ===
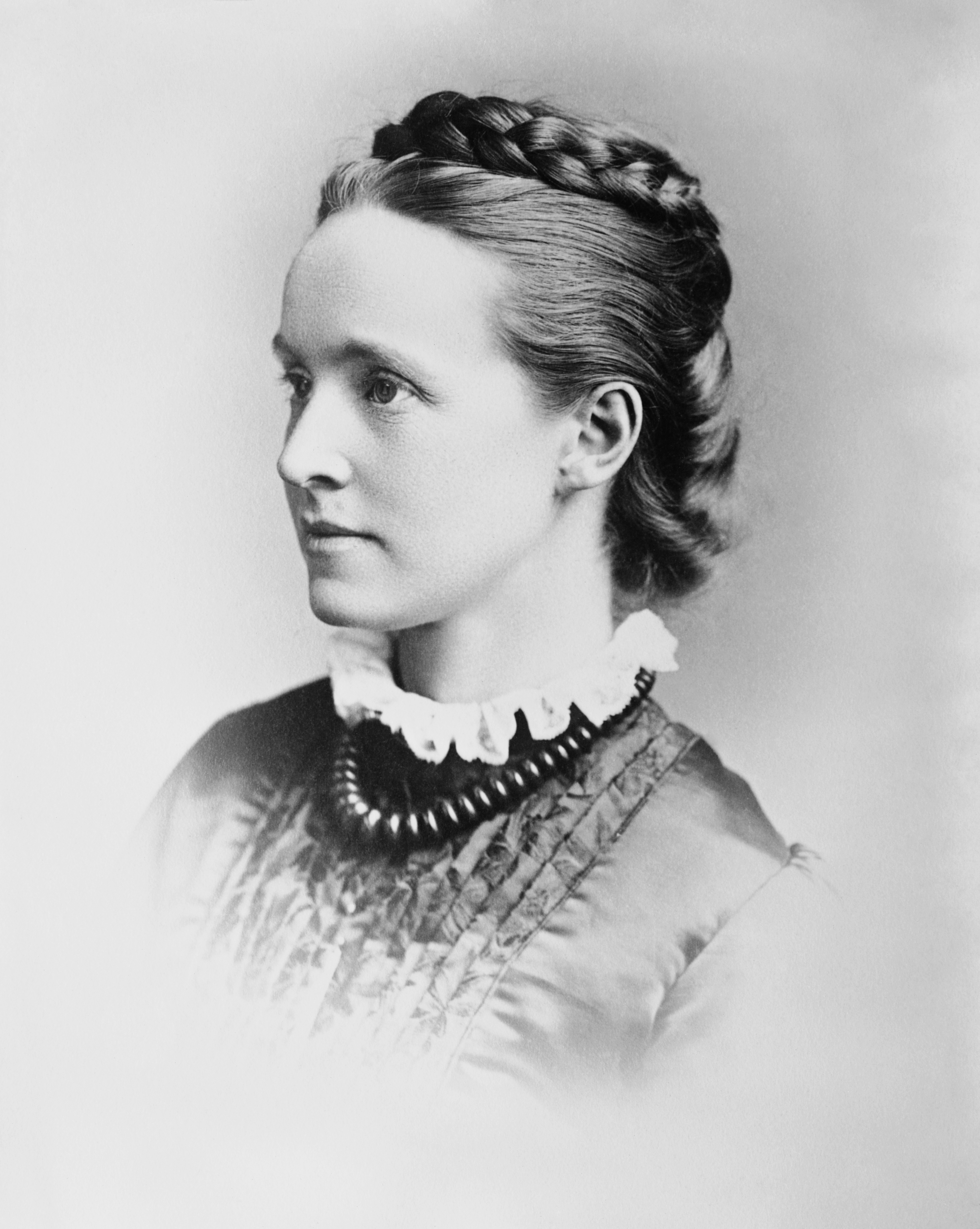
Millicent Fawcett

The Paris Peace Conference negotiations took place from January to May 1919, while the women's conference convened from mid-February to mid-April. On 10 February, when the women's conference opened, Thomson and Louise Compain, a writer and member of the French Union for Women's Suffrage, began serving as editors and translators to the women's conference secretary, Suzanne Grinberg, a lawyer, vice-president of the Association du Jeune Barreau in Paris, and secretary of the central committee of the French Union for Women's Suffrage. Constance Drexel, a German-American newspaper reporter, wrote daily dispatches for the Chicago Tribune Foreign News Service and collaborated with the women delegates throughout the conference.

On 11 February, a delegation led by chair Millicent Fawcett, a leader in the British suffrage movement and president of the National Union of Women's Suffrage Societies, called on Wilson. The delegation included Zabel Yesayan of Armenia, who brought a report about women in Armenia and Macedonia being captured during the war and detained in harems; Margherita Ancona, president of the National Pro Suffrage Federation for Italy; and Nina Boyle (Union of South Africa), a member of the Women's Freedom League and a journalist. Belgian delegates included Jane Brigode, president of the Belgian Federation for Suffrage and Marie Parent, president of the Belgian National Council of Women and League for Rights of Women. Also present were British delegates Ray Strachey, a member of the National Union of Women's Suffrage Societies and Rosamond Smith. The French women who participated in the delegation were de Witt-Schlumberger; Cécile Brunschvicg, a founder of the French Union for Women's Suffrage and its first general secretary; and Marguerite Pichon-Landry, chair of the legislation section of the National Council of French Women. The delegates from the US were Katharine Bement Davis, head of the US government's Women's Department of Social Hygiene; Florence Jaffray Harriman, chair of the Women's Committee of the Democratic Party; and Juliet Barrett Rublee, a member of the National Birth Control League and the Cornish [New Hampshire] Equal Suffrage League. The delegation asked if a Women's Commission could be included in the conference to address the concerns of women and children. At the meeting Wilson suggested, instead, that the male diplomats from the peace conference form a Women's Commission to which the Inter-Allied Women's Conference could serve as advisers.

The following day, an almost identical delegation to that which had met with Wilson, met with French President Raymond Poincaré and his wife, Henriette, at the Élysée Palace. It included de Witt-Schlumberger, Ruth Atkinson, president of the Nelson, New Zealand branch of the Woman's Christian Temperance Union, and delegates from Belgium, France, Italy, the UK, and possibly Australia. (Note: Inclusion of an Australian delegate may be in error. While newspapers from Australia (searched from January through May 1919) report on Atkinson of New Zealand, they do not mention an Australian delegate. Neither Siegel nor Glenda Sluga include an Australian in attendance.) Also present were three women from the US: Harriman, Rublee, and Harriet Taylor, head of the YMCA in France. On 13 February, Wilson took the request to the Council of Ten—Arthur Balfour (UK), Georges Clemenceau (France), Robert Lansing (US), Baron Nobuaki Makino (Japan), Viscount Alfred Milner (UK), Vittorio Orlando (Italy), Stephen Pichon (France), Sidney Sonnino (Italy), and Wilson—along with the Maharaja of Bikaner Ganga Singh (India) and other dignitaries. Once again the women's proposal was dismissed, with Prime Minister Clemenceau recommending that they be referred to work with the Commission on Labour. (Note: The discussion regarding "the ladies" does not appear in the official minutes for 13 February and Glenda Sluga, a historian at the University of Sydney, stated that evidence of the "secret meeting" was found in the archival records of the "American Commission to Negotiate Peace".)

Their dismissal did not stop the women from attempting to gain support from the peace conference delegates. They met with Jules Cambon, Paul Hymans and Poincaré, all of whom agreed that the women's input on such issues as deportations from Armenia, Belgium, Greece, France, Poland, and Serbia and the sale of women in Greece and the Ottoman Empire were pertinent issues on which a women's commission might gather data. At the end of February, some of the women who had come from Britain returned home and were replaced in early March by Margery Corbett Ashby, a member of the executive board of the National Union of Women's Suffrage Societies, and Margery Fry, a penal reformer, who at one time was president of the Birmingham branch of the National Union of Women Workers and a member of the Constitutional Society for Women's Suffrage. Also by the end of February, Graziella Sonnino Carpi of the National Women's Union (Unione femminile nazionale) of Milan and Eva Mitzhouma of Poland had joined the women's conference.

=== March ===
The women's conference delegates met with peace conference delegates from 16 countries, hoping to generate support at least for allowing women to sit on committees likely to deal with issues concerning women and children. A second delegation of women, led by de Witt-Schlumberger, met with the Council of Ten, without Wilson present, on 11 March. The Peace Conference delegates who were present agreed to allow the women an audience with the Commission on International Labour Legislation and the League of Nations Commission. While an audience was far less than the women wanted, allowing them formal participation in an international treaty negotiation was unprecedented.

On 18 March, suffragists testified before the Labour Commission, giving an overview of women's working conditions. In addition to Ashby (UK), several of the delegates were from France. These included Brunschvicg; Eugénie Beeckmans, a seamstress and member of the French Confederation of Christian Workers (Confédération française des travailleurs chrétiens); Georgette Bouillot, a representative of the workers of the General Confederation of Labour (Confédération générale du travail); Jeanne Bouvier, co-founder of the French Office for Work at Home, (Office français du travail à domicile) and trade unionist; Gabrielle Duchêne, co-founder of the Office français du travail à domicile, pacifist, and member of the National Council of French Women; and Maria Vérone, a lawyer, journalist, and general secretary of the French League for Women's Rights (Ligue française pour le droit des femmes). Delegates from other countries included Harriman (US); Marie d'Amalio-Tivoli, (Note: In a letter to Carrie Chapman Catt about the conference, Fannie Fern Andrews recorded "Madame D'Amatio Tivoli, Italy". It is unclear whether the participant's surname was "D'Amatio" and the place Tivoli, Italy or if the surname is "Tivoli". Oldfield cited the surname as "Tivoli". The Chicago Tribune lists her name as Mme. d'Amalio-Tivoli, which appears to be the correct identity based on other sources.) wife of Peace Conference delegate Mariano D'Amelio and Louise van den Plas (Belgium), founder of Christian Feminism of Belgium (Féminisme chrétien de Belgique).

The resolutions the women's conference delegates presented to the chair of the Labour Commission, Samuel Gompers, covered a variety of issues including the health hazards of working conditions. There were recommendations on limiting hours worked per day and per week, on establishing a fair minimum wage based upon a cost of living analysis, and on equal pay for equal work; as well as on regulations for child labour, maternity pay, and technical trade education. They also asked for each nation to establish a formal body of women members to analyse and advise on legislative policy liable to impact women. Two trade unionists from the US, Mary Anderson and Rose Schneiderman, arrived in Paris too late to participate in the presentation to the Labour Commission. Instead, they met with Wilson, to urge that women be allowed to participate in global governance structures. Though he made promises to include women, they were to be unfulfilled. By the end of March, the women had persuaded the delegates to introduce a measure specifying that women could serve in any office of the League of Nations. The resolution was presented by Lord Robert Cecil and received unanimous approval on 28 March from the League of Nations Commission.

=== April ===
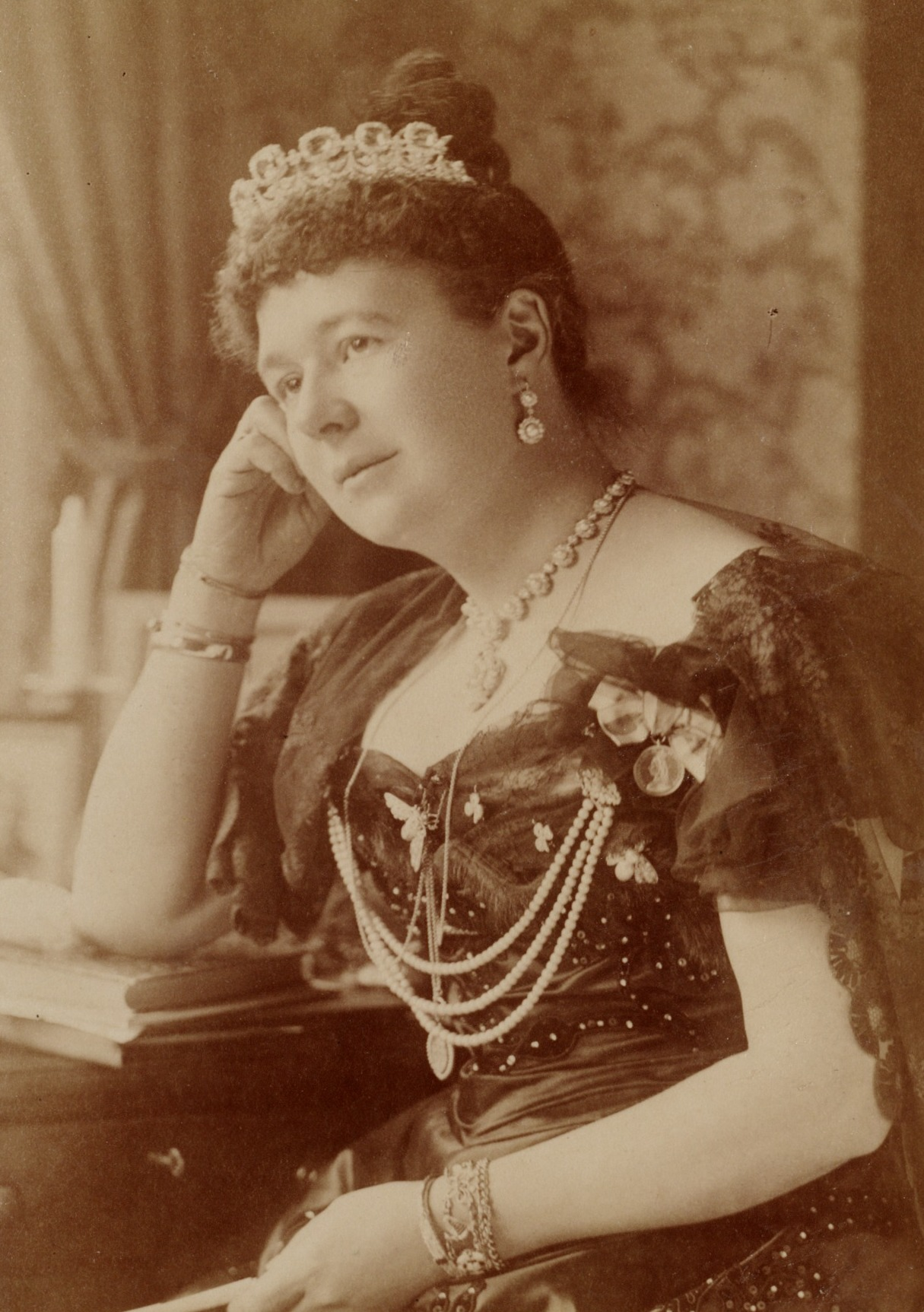
Lady Aberdeen

Lady Aberdeen, president of the International Council of Women arrived at the conference after the delegates had met with the Labour Commission to assist with preparations for the presentation to the League of Nations Commission. She called together a group of women to prepare a resolution to be read to the delegates. The documents they prepared focused on three key areas: civil status, political status, and human rights. Arguing that the civil status of women and children was inadequately addressed in international law, the women's conference delegates expressed concern over civil codes which allowed child marriages; condoned prostituting, trafficking, and the sale of women and children; and treated women as the chattels of their husbands and fathers. They called for international law to provide protections in these areas, and proposed an institution be established to protect public health and advise the public on hygiene and disease. The resolution pointed out that while women suffered in time of war, they also undertook jobs which soldiers, who were away fighting, could not do and supported efforts to secure the safety and welfare of their countries. They asked for suffrage to be granted to women, enabling them to participate in the process of governance. The women's final point was that provisions should be made to ensure that internationally, basic education provided training on civilisation and the obligations of citizenship, with a focus on respecting the humanity, cultures, and human rights of all citizens of each nation.

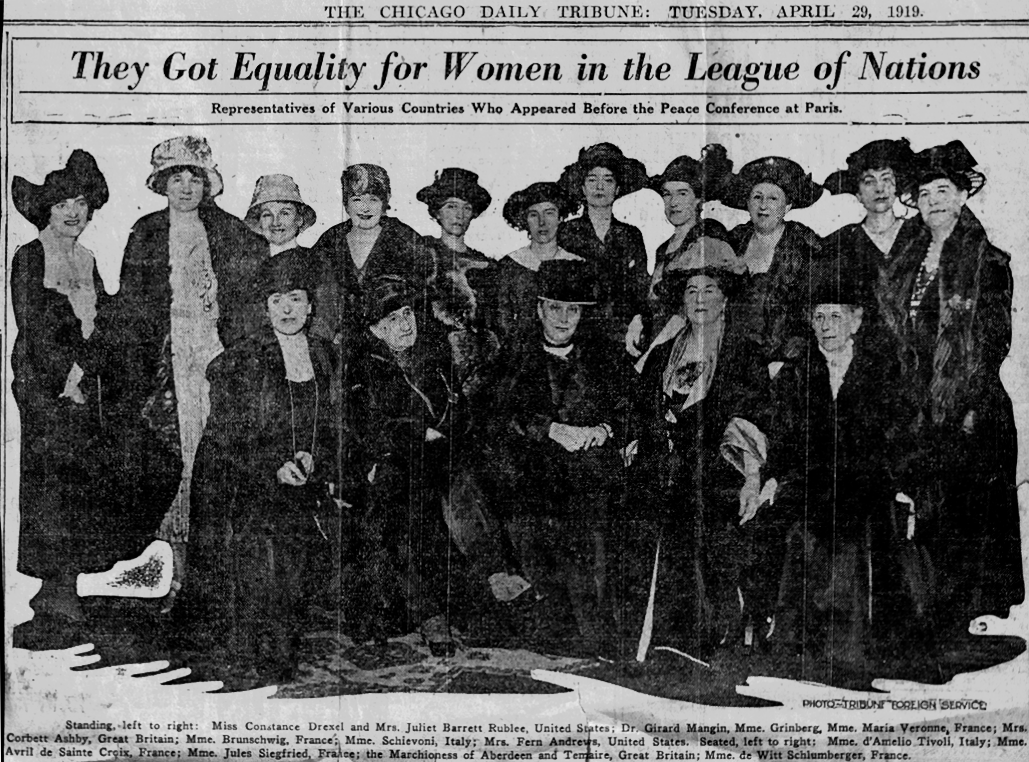
Conference end participants: Front row (l–r): Maria d'Amelio-Tivoli (Italy), Avril de Sainte-Croix (France), Julie Siegfried (France), Lady Aberdeen (UK), Marguerite de Witt-Schlumberger (France). Back row (l–r): Constance Drexel (US), Juliet Barret Rublee (US), Nicole Girard-Mangin (France), Suzanne Grinberg (France), unknown, Maria Vérone (France), unknown, Margery Corbett Ashby (UK), Cécile Brunschvicg (France), Alice Schiavoni (Italy), and Fannie Fern Andrews (US)

Seventeen of the delegates from the Inter-Allied Women's Conference participated on 10 April in a presentation to the League of Nations Commission. Among them were Lady Aberdeen, de Witt-Schlumberger, Ashby, Brunschvicg, Fry, Grinberg, Rublee, d'Amalio-Tivoli, and Vérone. Other French women in the delegation included Gabrielle Alphen-Salvador of the French Union for Women's Suffrage, who was on the International Women's Council's steering committee; Nicole Girard-Mangin, a military physician and campaigner for the French Union for Women's Suffrage; Marie-Louise Puech, a secretary of the French Union for Women's Suffrage; Avril de Sainte-Croix, a journalist and secretary of the National Council of French Women; and Julie Siegfried, president of the National Council of French Women. The rest of the delegation included Elisa Brătianu, wife of the Prime Minister of Romania Ion I. C. Brătianu; Fannie Fern Andrews, a Canadian-American teacher, pacifist, and member of the Woman's Peace Party, who founded the American School Peace League; and Alice Schiavoni, a member of the National Council of Italian Women (Consiglio Nazionale delle Donne Italiane). The delegates insisted women should be given equal access to all offices, committees, and bodies of the League, and that governments which failed to grant equality to women should be barred from membership. They argued that if people were allowed to have self-determination, women should have equal opportunity and the legal right to make their own life choices. The demands for suffrage and recognition of the civil, political, and human rights of women were unsuccessful. However, Article 7 of the Covenant of the League of Nations, which was incorporated into the Versailles Treaty, admitted women to all organisational positions of the League.

== Aftermath ==
The delegates of the official peace conference refused to see women's citizenship and political agency as an international concern or one of human rights. Instead, especially in regard to married women, the delegates maintained that each nation should have the ability to determine its own citizenship requirements. The Inter-Allied Women's Conference suggestions on education, labour, and nationality were deemed "far too radical" for implementation and most of them were dismissed without much consideration. The Covenant of the League of Nations did contain provisions "that the member states should promote humane conditions of labour for men, women, and children, as well as prevent traffic in women and children".

Many feminists who had initially supported the creation of the League of Nations were disillusioned by the final terms of the Treaty of Versailles. At the Zürich Peace Conference, hosted by the International Committee of Women for Permanent Peace from 17 to 19 May 1919, the delegates vilified the Treaty for both its punitive measures and its lack of provisions to condemn violence. They also expressed disdain for the exclusion of women from civil and political participation. Representatives of the Women for Permanent Peace (renamed the Women's International League for Peace and Freedom at the Zürich conference) incorporated many of the ideals of the Inter-Allied Women's Conference in the "Woman's Charter", which they eventually adopted. The International Labour Organisation, when it was founded as an agency of the League of Nations, adopted the women's idea of equal pay for equal work in its constitutional preamble. Its governing documents also specified a woman delegate should be appointed to attend the International Labour Conference, whenever issues concerning women were to be discussed.

Women labour leaders, also dissatisfied with the outcome of the negotiations, were intent on participating in the November International Labour Conference scheduled to convene in Washington, D.C. Margaret Dreier Robins, president of the Women's Trade Union League, was convinced that women would again be barred from official proceedings. To prevent such an outcome, she spearheaded the International Congress of Working Women, which convened on 29 October to prepare an agenda of significant points. During the ten days of the conference, the women adopted into their resolution many of the labour standards and workers' rights guarantees that the women's conference delegates had proposed. The subsequent attendance and authoritative speeches made by many of the delegates from the Congress of Working Women at the International Labour Conference resulted in the passage of international labour standards for maternity leave, on working hours, and for child labour (though these were below those proposed by the women concerned).

== Legacy ==
During the Second World War, French feminist archives, along with others from Belgium, Liechtenstein, and the Netherlands, including the International Archives for the Women's Movement, were looted by the Nazis. As the Soviet forces advanced on the territories held by Nazi Germany, they confiscated the records and took them to Moscow where they were housed in the KGB's secret Osobyi Archive (Russian: Особый архив). The documents were discovered in the early 1990s; glasnost and perestroika policy reforms eventually led to their repatriation to their respective countries of origin. The French archival records were delivered in two convoys in February and November 2000 and catalogued by the Archives Department of the Ministry of Foreign Affairs. It was determined by the heirs of the feminists, whose works had been stolen, that a public archive would be beneficial and the Association des archives féministes (Feminist Archives Association) was founded to create the Archives du Féminisme at the University of Angers. After two years of sorting and cataloguing the materials, the archive opened, allowing scholars to begin accessing and assessing the documents.

Because the initial meetings of women with the Peace Conference delegates and the Council of Ten were not part of the official records of the conference, and the French archives had been effectively lost, scholarship on the Inter-Allied Women's Conference did not emerge until the 21st century. These new studies into the Conference have shown that women were active participants in the peace process and desired to assume public roles in shaping the international policies at the end of the First World War. The historian Glenda Sluga, a fellow of the Australian Academy of the Humanities, states that the participants saw "female self-determination as the corollary of the democratisation of nations". In 2019, the 133rd American Historical Association meeting featured presentations by the historians Mona L. Siegel of California State University and Dorothy Sue Cobble of Rutgers University reassessing the import of the Inter-Allied Women's Conference to the peace process in 1919. Siegel concluded that though the women's conference delegates did not achieve many of their aims, they legitimised women's participation in international policy making and globalised the discussion of human rights, successes which have continued to the present day.

== Conference participants ==
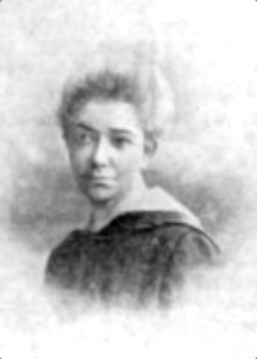
Margherita Ancona

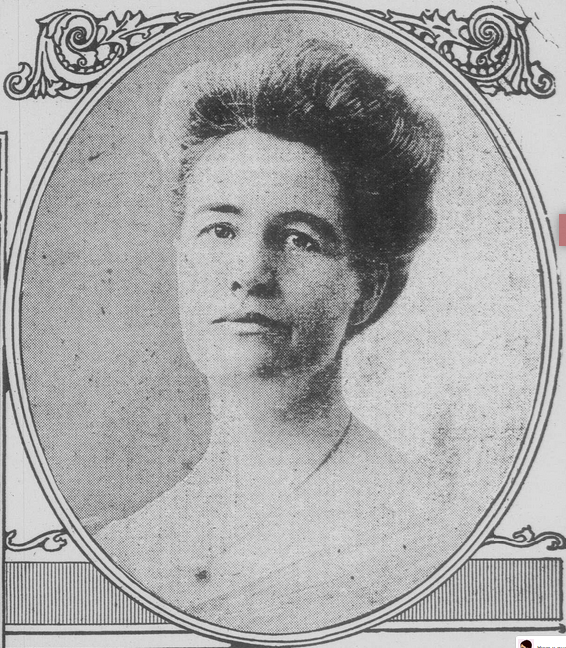
Fannie Fern Andrews

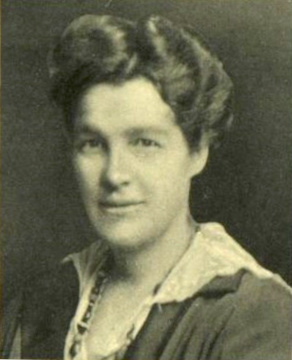
Margery Corbett Ashby

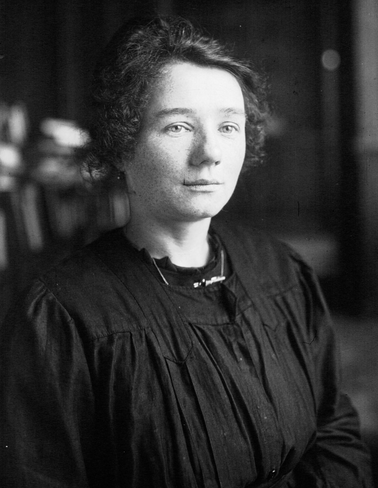
Georgette Bouillot

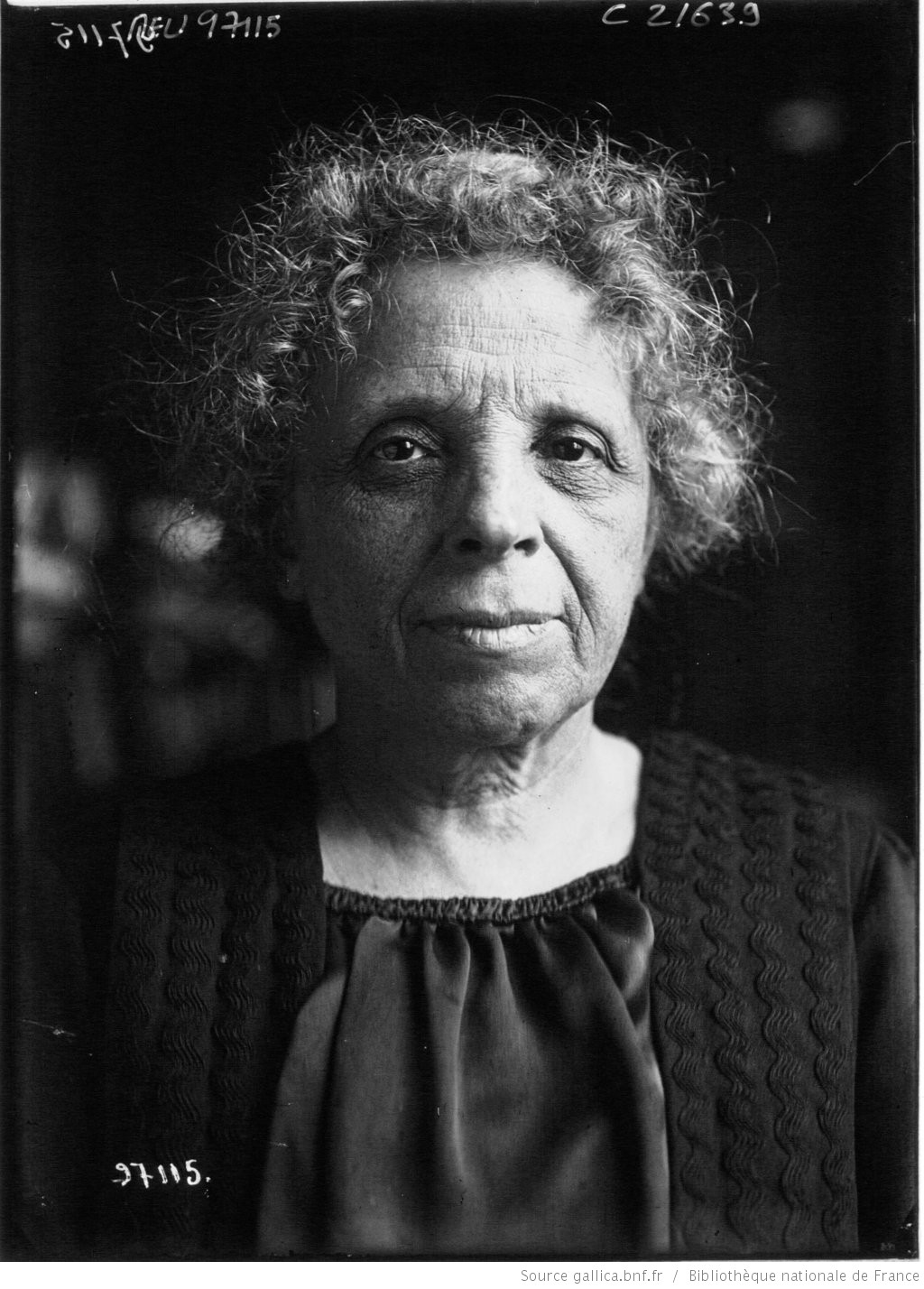
Jeanne Bouvier

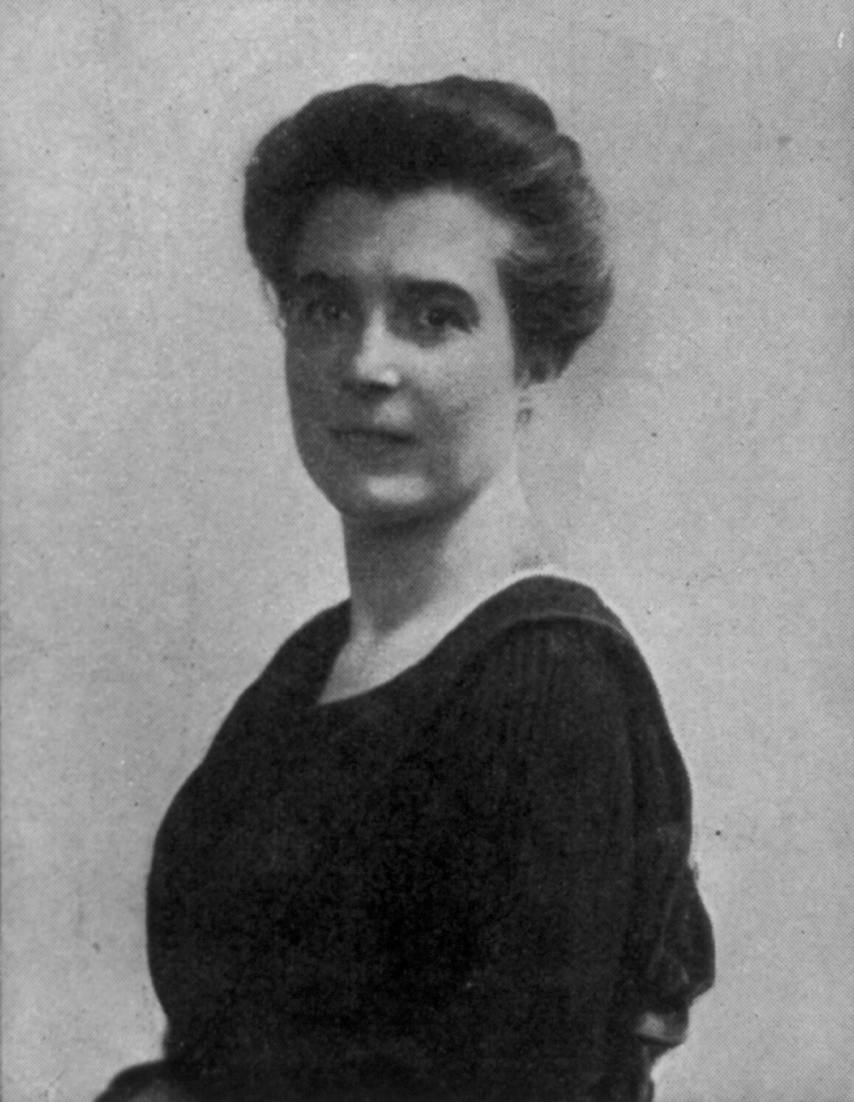
Jane Brigode

Cécile Brunschvicg

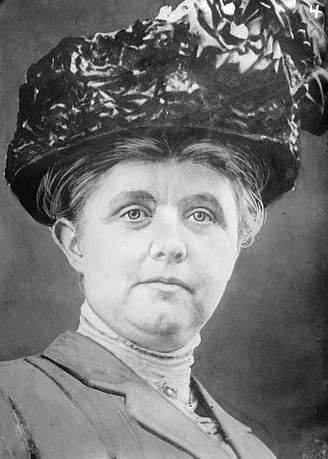
Katharine Bement Davis

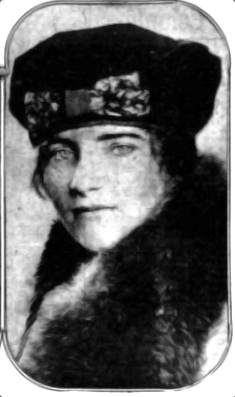
Constance Drexel

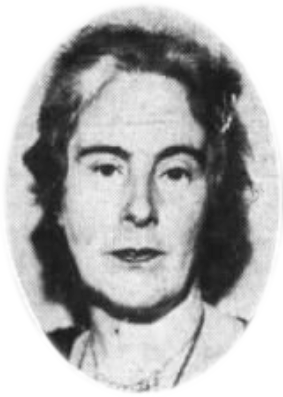
Margery Fry

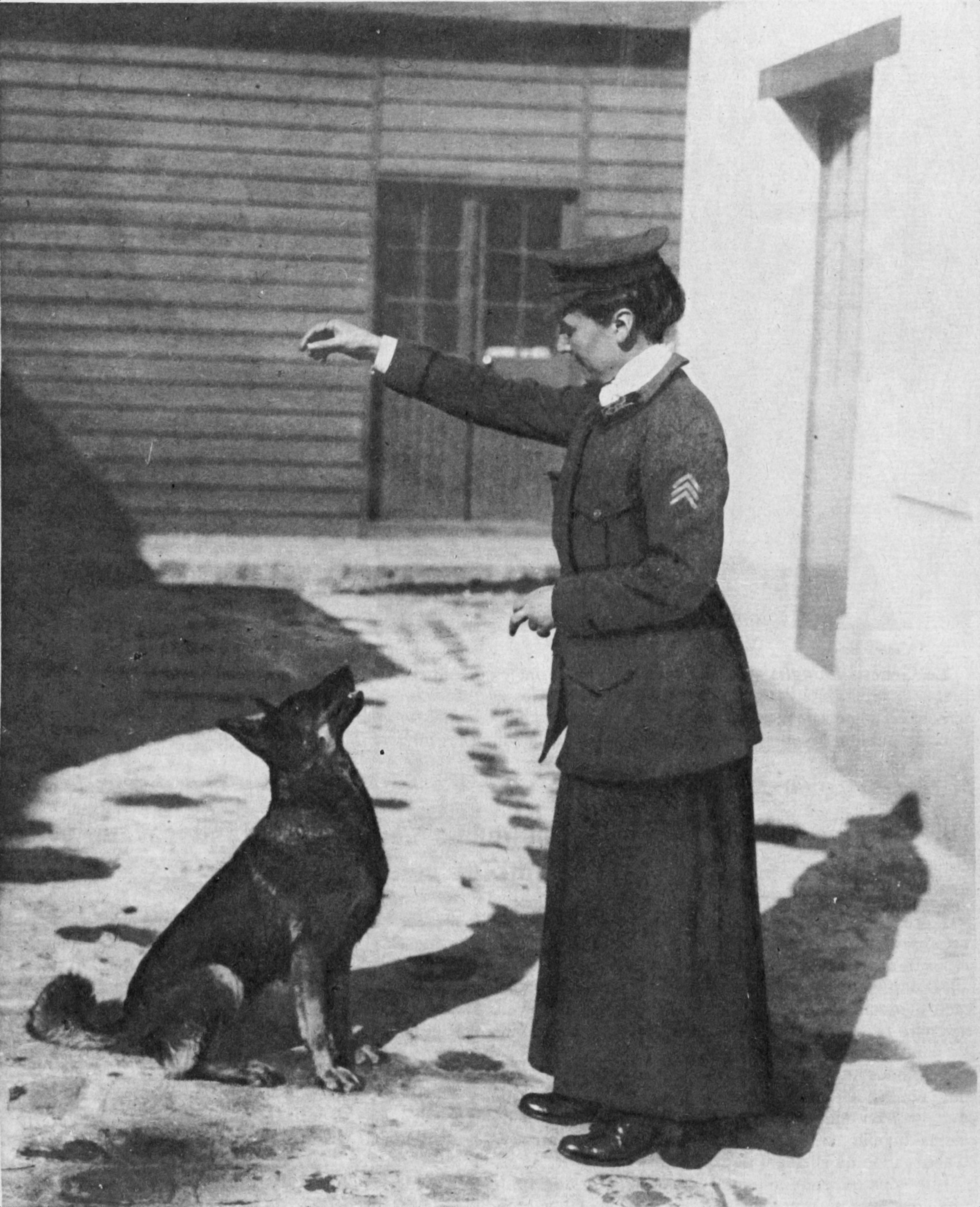
Nicole Girard-Mangin

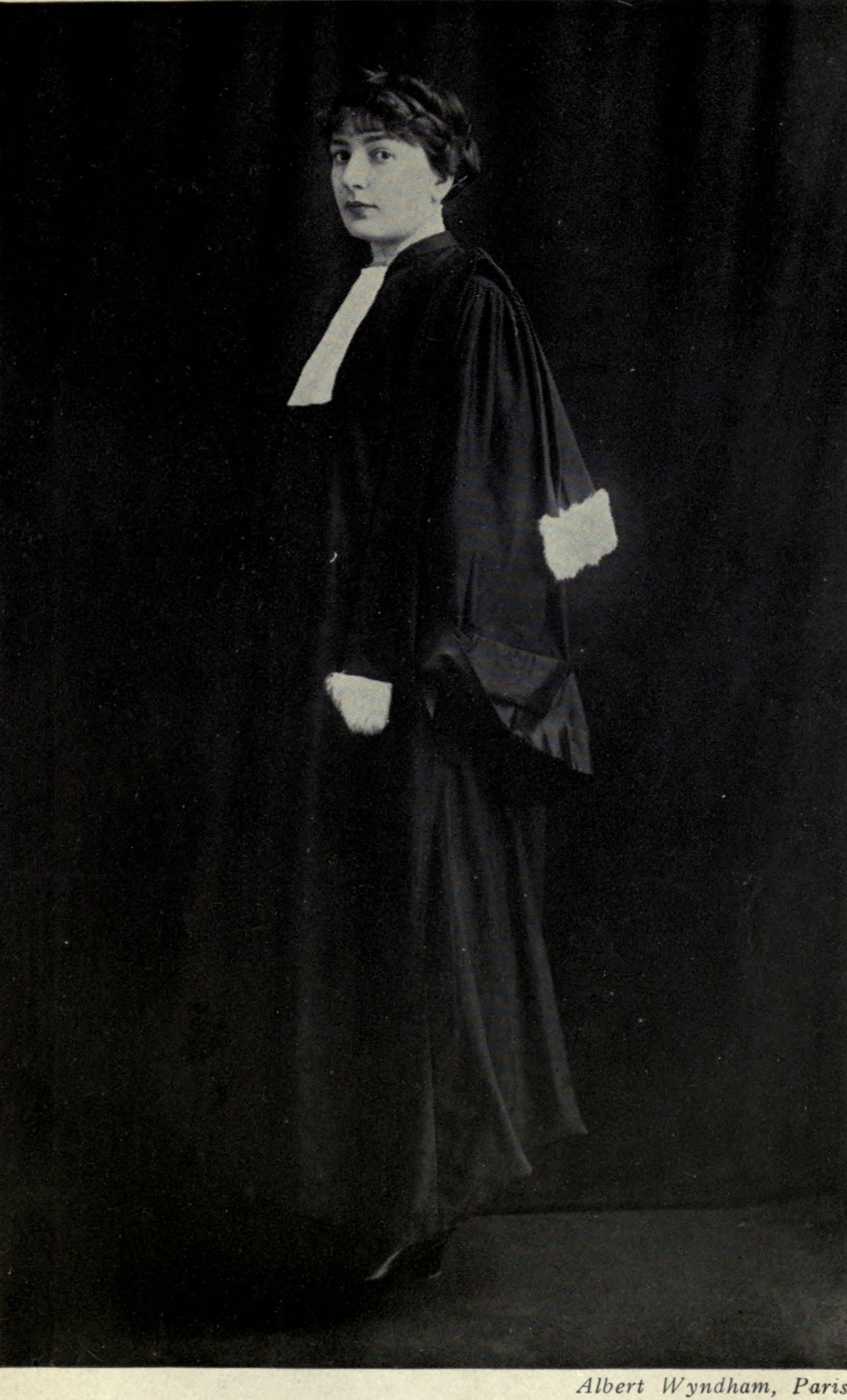
Suzanne Grinberg

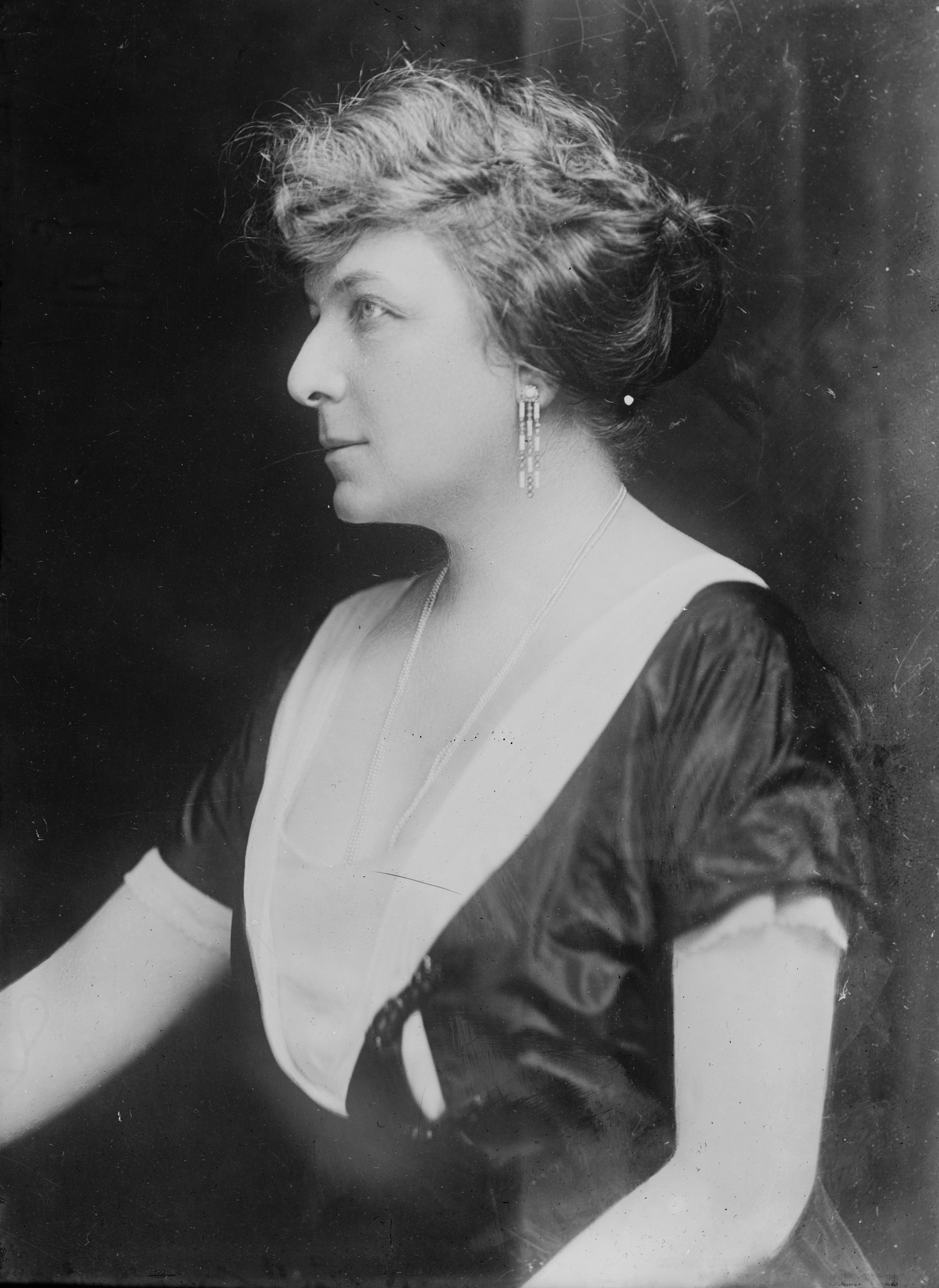
Florence Jaffray Harriman

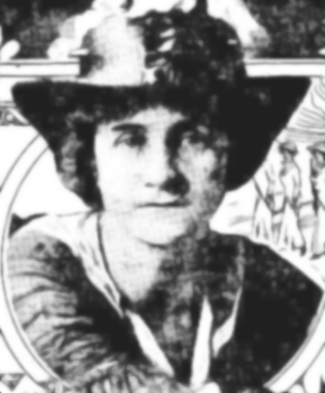
Juliet Barrett Rublee

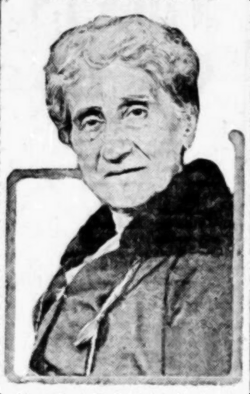
Avril de Sainte-Croix

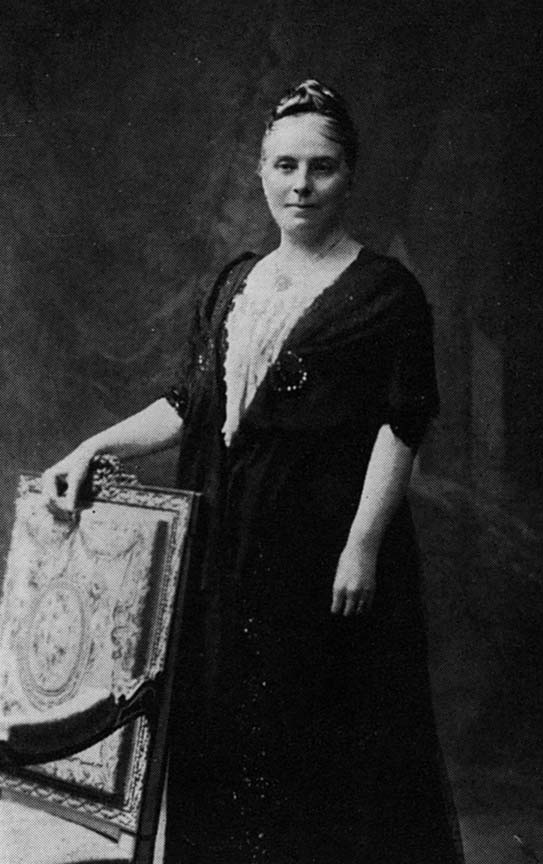
Julie Siegfried

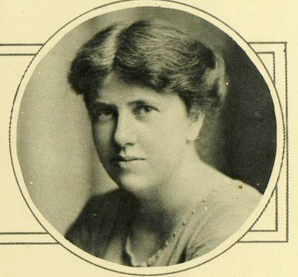
Ray Strachey

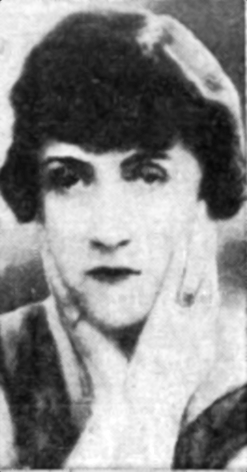
Valentine Thomson

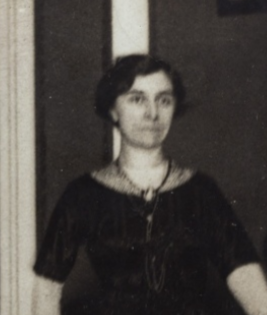
Maria Vérone
