= Valentine Thomson =

French journalist, playwright and editor

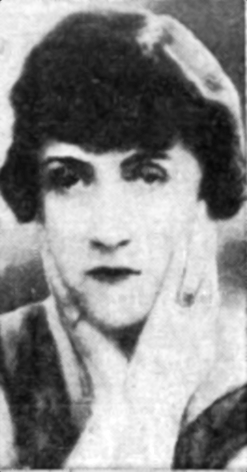
- Thomson in a 1933 visit to the United States
- Born: Valentine Mathilde Amélie Thomson; 3 June 1881; Paris, France
- Died: 15 January 1944 (aged 62); Paris, France
- Other names: Valentine Jagerschmidt, Valentine Jager-Schmidt, Valentine Jaeger-Schmidt, Valentine Jagerschmidt Thompson, Valentine Jager-Schmidt Thompson
- Occupations: journalist, writer, women's rights activist
- Spouse: André Jaeger-Schmidt
- Father: Gaston Thomson
- Relatives: Adolphe Crémieux (great-grandfather); Marcel Proust (cousin)

Valentine Mathilde Amélie Thomson (3 June 1881 – 15 January 1944) was an influential French journalist, playwright and editor, who was active both in Europe and the United States. Daughter of the left-wing politician Gaston Thomson, in 1919 she was a delegate at the Inter-Allied Women's Conference which sought to introduce women's issues to the peace process following the end of the First World War. In Paris, in collaboration with her husband, the journalist and screenwriter André Jaeger-Schmidt (1884–1940), she wrote plays which were staged in Paris and the provinces. In the late 1920s she moved to the United States where she wrote about international politics for a variety of papers including the New York Times and Harper's Magazine. She was also known for the salons she held with prominent figures of her times.

== Early life ==
Valentine Mathilde Amélie Thomson was born on 3 June 1881 in Paris to Henriette Mathilde Elmire (née Peigné) and Gaston Arnold Marie Thomson. Her father was a French politician, serving as a cabinet minister for several years. At one point he served as Minister of the Marine and during World War I was the Minister of Commerce. Thomson's paternal family were natives of Charleston, South Carolina, who migrated to France in the 18th century. Their ship was involved in an accident at sea and the only survivor from her family was a two-year-old boy, Peter Johnson Thompson. Thompson was raised by an aunt in France and eventually gained French citizenship. On her mother's side, she was a great-grandchild of Adolphe Crémieux, a brilliant lawyer and government minister. She was also a cousin of Marcel Proust. From the time that she was young, Thomson was exposed to politicians and officials and became interested in politics. She also developed solid friendships with celebrated literary figures including Pierre Loti and Anatole France. When she was 20, she began to publish essays and historical studies inspired by her frequent trips around Europe.

== Career ==
Thomson began her career as a journalist, working for Paris papers and periodicals, including Femina, Excelsior and L'Homme libre. She became the director of La Vie Feminine and Pandora, two feminist journals, and was very interested in women's rights. From 1916, she operated the Ecole Hoteliaire to train women and girls to work in the hospitality industry. The school offered a three-month training period where students learned how to arrange flowers, keep inventories of supplies, perform general housekeeping, serve a meal, set a table, spread a bed, and wash and repair linen. They also had instruction in bookkeeping and courses in English, French and Russian languages. After completing the course, the students were given a six-month internship at a hotel, after which time, they had an examination and the opportunity to earn a diploma.

Thomson met fellow journalist André Jaeger-Schmidt before the beginning of the war and the two were married. In 1919, she led a delegation of 80 women to meet with President Woodrow Wilson to ask for the inclusion of women in the deliberations of the Paris Peace Conference. Just over a week later, when the Inter-Allied Women's Conference opened, she began serving as an editor and translator for the conference delegates. The conference lasted from 10 February to 10 April, and at its conclusion Thomson began a tour of the U.S. with Alice Masaryk. The women were part of a lecture conference series directed by the Children's Bureau of the U. S. Department of Labor and were to speak on the impacts of war on children's education, health and welfare.

After she returned to France, Thomson and Jaeger-Schmidt traveled, working as journalists and visiting Bucharest, Russia and Turkey. Upon returning to Paris, they wrote six plays together, after which he turned to filmmaking, and she returned to the political sphere. In the 1930s, she began making annual trips to the United States to foster good relations between the two countries. As the hostess of a diplomatic salon, she was an influential political actor and as a journalist she interviewed people of interest, like Engelbert Dollfuss, Hitler, and Mussolini, on whom she spoke in the United States. In the early 1930s, she began publishing political biographies in English, including one on Aristide Briand, Briand—Man of Peace (1930), based on a series of interviews with the subject and one on John Paul Jones, Knight of the Seas (1939), based on material from French archival records. She also published a novel, a study of European politics and politicians, and a magazine article on Proust.

== Death and legacy ==
Thomson died on 15 January 1944 at her home 33 rue Barbet-de-Jouy. Her funeral was held on the 19 January at Saint-François-Xavier Church and on the 10th anniversary of her death the church held a memorial service for her.

== Awards ==
- 1937: For her Le corsaire chez l’impératrice she won the Prix Montyon from the Académie Française.

== Selected works ==
- Thomson, Valentine (1910). La vie sentimentale de Rachel, d'après des lettres inédites (in French). Paris, France: Calmann-Lévy. OCLC 2936204.
- Thomson, Valentine (1911). Chérubin et l'amour (in French). Paris, France: Calmann-Lévy. OCLC 872200015.
- Thomson, Valentine (1930). Briand—Man of Peace. London, England: Hutchinson & Co. OCLC 643061684.
- Thomson, Valentine (1931). You Don't Know Charley. New York, New York: Brewer and Warren. OCLC 11048152.
- Thomson, Valentine (May 1932). "My Cousin Marcel Proust". Harper's Magazine. New York, New York: Harper & Brothers. ISSN 0017-789X.
- Thomson, Valentine (1932). Young Europe. Garden City, New York: Doubleday, Doran & Co. OCLC 503952373.
- Thomson, Valentine (1936). Le corsaire chez l'impératrice (in French). Paris: Librairie Pion.
- Thomson, Valentine (1939). Knight of the Seas: The Adventurous Life of John Paul Jones. New York, New York: Liveright Publishing Corporation. OCLC 869425454.
