= Eugénie Beeckmans =

French trade unionist and feminist

Eugénie Beeckmans (also Eugénie-Jeanne Beeckmans) was a trade unionist and women's rights advocate. In 1913, she was appointed to the Conseil supérieur de l'enseignement technique (Higher Council of Technical Education) for the French Republic. She was one of the delegates to the Inter-Allied Women's Conference, a parallel congress to the 1919 Paris Peace Conference and participated in the 18 March presentation to the Labour Commission of the Peace Conference regarding working conditions faced by women labourers. She served as the inaugural president of the Fédération des Syndicats professionnels du Vêtement (Federation of Professional Garment Trade Unions) of the Confédération Française des Travailleurs Chrétiens (CFTC) from its founding in 1921 until 1937. In 1921, she represented the Syndicat de l’Abbaye (Abbey Union) at the Second CFTC Congress. She was elected as a member of the Confederal Bureau of the General Confederation of Labour in 1921 and re-elected in 1925, and from 1922 to 1924 served on their national council. In 1923, together with Maria Bardot, she successfully negotiated the first collective labour agreement for female garment workers, providing a basis for better wages and for expanding union membership. In the period between the two world wars, as an influential member of the CFTC, she is considered to be among the most striking representatives of women's Christian militarism in France.

In 1932, she was awarded the Ministry of Labour's gold medal of honour for her work as a trade unionist. She was also honoured by the Holy See with the Pro Ecclesia et Pontifice in 1937.
