= Adolphe Landry =

French demographer and politician

Michel Auguste Adolphe Landry
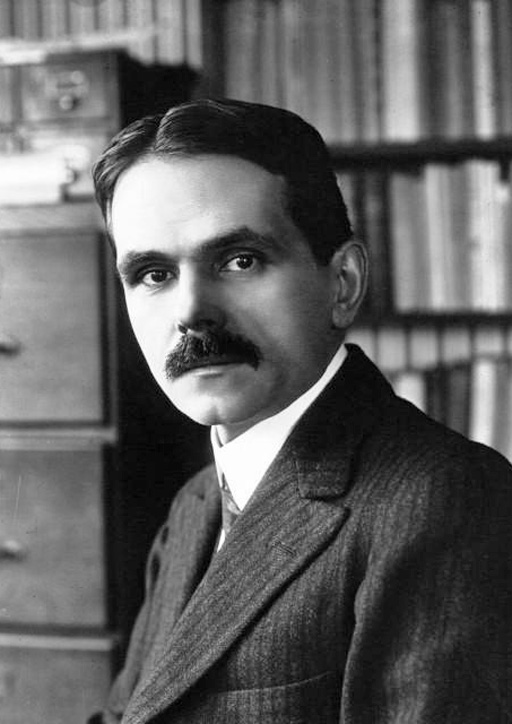
- Landry in 1917

Minister of the Navy
- In office 24 September 1920 – 14 January 1921
- Prime Minister: Georges Leygues
- Preceded by: Georges Leygues
- Succeeded by: Gabriel Guist'hau

Minister of Public Education
- In office 9 June 1924 – 10 June 1924
- Prime Minister: Frédéric François-Marsal
- Preceded by: Henry de Jouvenel
- Succeeded by: François Albert

Minister of Labor and Social Security
- In office 17 January 1931 – 16 February 1932
- Prime Minister: Pierre Laval
- Preceded by: Édouard Grinda
- Succeeded by: Pierre Laval

Personal details
- Born: 29 September 1874 Ajaccio, Corsica
- Died: 30 August 1956 (aged 81) Paris, France
- Occupation: Professor

Michel Auguste Adolphe Landry (French pronunciation: [miʃɛl oɡyst adɔlf lɑ̃dʁi]; 29 September 1874 – 30 August 1956) was a French demographer and politician. He was deputy and then senator for Corsica between 1910 and 1955. He was Minister of the Navy from 1920 to 1921, Minister of Public Education for two days in June 1924 and Minister of Labor and Social Security from 1931 to 1932. He was the author of several books on economics and demographics. He saw that countries like France had moved from an age of high birth rates and high mortality, with the size of the population determined by the amount of food available, through a transition period to an age of low birth rates and long lives. The population might actually shrink unless the government took steps to encourage larger families.

== Early years (1874–1919) ==
Michel Auguste Adolphe Landry was born on 29 September 1874 in Ajaccio, Corsica, to an old Corsican family. He had one brother, who became director of the French Institute in Florence, and three sisters. One of them, Marguerite Pichon-Landry, became president of the National Council of French Women (Conseil National des femmes françaises). He attended secondary school in Nîmes, where his father was president of the tribunal, then at the Lycée Louis-le-Grand. He was admitted to the École Normale Supérieure, where he gained an agrégation de philosophie, which qualified him as an associate professor in philosophy.

Landry moved to Toulouse, where he married in 1897. They had two children. He then turned to the law, which he studied at the Sorbonne. In his 1901 thesis on the social utility of private property Landry presented the work of Karl Marx as an important achievement, but one that could be corrected and improved. He condemned capitalism and its obsession with profit, and saw value in a form of socialism that incorporated marginalism and liberalism. This thesis drew considerable comment, much of it hostile. In 1904 he published L'intérêt du capital, followed by various other works on economics, the history of art, political sociology and so on. In 1907 he was appointed to the chair of economic history at the École pratique des hautes études.

Landry ran for election to the chamber of deputies on 6 May 1906 but did not succeed. He ran again for the Calvi constituency in 1910 and this time was elected in the second round. In the chamber he was particularly interested in the subject of commerce. In 1912 Landry became a member of the board of the natalist Alliance nationale contre le dépopulation (National Alliance Against Depopulation). He was influential in obtaining the passage of the 1913 law for assistance to large families. Landry ran for reelection for Calvi on 26 April 1914 and won in the first round. He was extremely active on issues such as workers' and peasants' pensions, family income tax, trade and finance.

== Inter-war period (1919–40) ==
On 16 November 1919 Landry was reelected on the platform of the Corsican Democratic Republican Party (Parti républicain démocratique corse). In 1920 he obtained creation of the "large family card" (carte famille nombreuse) which gave public transport discounts to families with more than two children. On 24 September 1920 he was appointed Minister of the Navy in the cabinet of Georges Leygues, which resigned on 12 January 1921. As Minister he revived the Académie de Marine. Landry was elected vice-president of the chamber in 1923, and reelected in 1924. He was rapporteur general of the finance committee.

On 11 May 1924 Landry was reelected on the platform of the Corsican Democratic Republican Party. He again sat on the Finance Committee. On 9 June 1924 he was appointed Minister of Education, Fine Arts and Technical Education in the ephemeral cabinet of Frédéric François-Marsal, which lasted for only 24 hours between the 3rd cabinet of Raymond Poincaré and the 1st cabinet of Édouard Herriot.

On 22 April 1928 Landry was easily elected as deputy for Ajaccio. Again he sat on the finance committee, and supported measures such as family support, affordable housing and the birth rate. He was often rapporteur of projects or proposed laws related to social or family issues, notably the 1930 Social Assurance Law. He was elected senator on 14 January 1930 but resigned on 13 February 1930 and returned to the chamber. He was appointed Minister of Labor and Social Security in the 1st and 2nd cabinets of Pierre Laval, from 27 January 1931 to 16 February 1932. He passed the law that extended family allowances to all workers in commerce and industry.

Landry ran unsuccessfully for reelection on 1 May 1932. He lost again in the elections on 26 April 1936, but the result was invalidated, and he was elected in a fresh vote on 30 August 1936. He was again involved in proposals related to family and social problems. On 22 February 1939 the High Committee of the Population was created, with Landry as one of the five members. On 30 June 1939 the committee submitted a basic report to the government that became the Family Code (Code de la Famille) by decree on 29 July 1939. He abstained from voting on the draft constitutional law on 10 July 1940 that established the Vichy government. The government removed him from his office as mayor of Calvi.

== Post-war career (1945–56) ==
After the Liberation of France Landry would not accept appointment to the Provisional Consultative Assembly due to his Republican principles. He was appointed chairman of the committee on the cost of the enemy occupation, then as a member of the high consultative committee on population and the family. He was charged with advising the government on matters related to protecting the family, increasing the birthrate and integrating foreigners. He was elected to the first National Consultative Assembly on 21 October 1945, and then to the second National Consultative Assembly on 2 June 1946. In 1945 he gained acceptance of the principle of the family quotient, which came into force in 1948 and reduced the inequalities between rich and poor families.

Landry failed to be elected to the legislature in the elections of November 1946, but was elected Councilor of the Republic on 8 December 1946. In 1947 he moved to New York to reestablish the International Union for the Scientific Study of Population, and was elected president of this organization. In 1949 he was named honorary president. He joined the Rally of Left Republicans (Rassemblement des gauches républicaines, RGR) in the Council of the Republic. He was again active in discussions on social issues. From 1952 he no longer took part in debates due to his poor health. He did not run for reelection on 19 June 1955. Adolphe Landry died on 30 August 1956 in Paris at the age of 81.

== Demographic theories ==
Landry's interest in demographics developed in the inter-war period, culminating in the publication in 1934 of La Révolution démographique (The Demographic Revolution). This book reviewed the evolution of the world population from the 18th century to the inter-war period. Landry identified three demographic stages, the last being stagnation or depopulation. He said the government should respond by giving strong incentives for parents to have more children, such as family allowances and child care. Landry argued that a worldwide shift in the relative size of populations of countries would change the balance of power and threaten the position of France.

In Landry's view, before the mid-18th century the human population was strictly regulated by the resources available to support that population. After then, in Europe, there was a transition stage where people became able to regulate the length of their life and the number of children they had. People would react to the decrease in infant mortality by limiting the number of children. There would be a lag while the population learned that the drop in infant mortality was real, and adjusted to new social norms that place less importance in large families. He thought in the final stage there was a real possibility of depopulation. Landry's theories were precursors of the theory of "demographic transition" that developed after World War II.

== Publications ==
- Adolphe Landry (1901). L'utilité sociale de la propriété individuelle. Étude d'économie politique (in French). Paris: Georges Bellais.
- — (1902). La responsabilité pénale (in French).
- — (1904). L'intérêt du capital. Bibliothèque Internationale d'Èconomie Politique (in French). Paris: Ciard et Brière.
- — (1908). Manuel d'économique. À l'usage des facultés de droit (in French). Paris: V. Giard et E. Brière.
- — (1909). Notes critiques sur le Nicole Oresme de M. Bridrey (in French). Paris: Honoré Champion.
- — (1910). Essai économique sur les mutations dans l'ancienne France de Philippe le Bel à Charles VII (in French). Paris: Honoré Champion.
- — (1914). "Le Crédit industriel et commercial". Encyclopédie parlementaire des sciences politiques et sociales (in French). Dunod & Pinat.
- — (1934). La politique commerciale de la France (in French). Sirey: Institut de hautes études internationales.
- — (1934). La Théorie de l'intérêt d'après Irving Fisher (in French). Sirey.
- — (1934). La révolution démographique. Études et essais sur les problèmes de la population (in French).
- — (1935). La démographie de l'ancien Paris (in French). Berger-Levrault.
- — (1945). Traité de démographie (in French). Payot.

== Sources ==
- Daniel, Jean-Marc (2012-02-06). "Adolphe Landry (1874-1956), à l'origine de la politique familiale". Le Monde (in French).
- Jolly, Jean (1960–1977). "LANDRY (MICHEL, AUGUSTE, Adolphe)". Dictionnaire des parlementaires français de 1889 à 1940 (in French). Presses universitaires de France.
- Jabbari, Eric (2012-03-29). Pierre Laroque and the Welfare State in Postwar France. OUP Oxford. ISBN 978-0-19-928963-9.
- La documentation française (2005). "LANDRY (Adolphe)". Dictionnaire des parlementaires français de 1940 à 1958 (in French). Vol. 5. L-O. Documentation française. ISBN 2-11-005990-7.
- Parant, Alain (October 2009). "La révolution démographique selon Adolphe Landry (1934). De la subordination des peuples au principe de rationalisation de la vie". Revue Futuribles (in French) (356): 57–74. doi:10.1051/futur/35657.
- Rodet, Alain-Pierre (2015). "LANDRY ADOLPHE - (1874-1956)". Encyclopædia Universalis (in French).
- Sauvy, Alfred (1956). "Adolphe Landry". Population (in French). 11 (4).
- Wunsch, Guillaume J.; Caselli, Graziella; Vallin, Jacques (2005-12-20). Demography: Analysis And Synthesis; A Treatise in Population Studies. Academic Press. ISBN 978-0-12-765660-1.
