= Marie Parent =

Belgian journal editor and feminist

Marie Parent (1853–1934) was a Belgian journal editor, temperance activist, feminist and suffragist. She founded the Alliance des femmes contre les abus de l'alcool (Alliance of Women against Alcohol Abuse) in 1905 and the Ligue belge des femmes rationalistes (Belgian League of Rationalist Women) in 1920. For over 20 years, she headed and edited the Journal des Mères (Mothers' Journal), for which she received the Adelson Castiau award from the Royal Academy of Belgium and a gold medal at the 1910 Brussels International Exhibition.

== Biography ==
Born on 20 December 1853 in Brussels, Marie Parent was the seventh and last child of Jean-Jacques Florimond Parent, a printer and publisher, and Marie de Vogelsang, who took over her husband's business when he died.

She first ran a boarding house near Lake Genval together with one of her sisters, before turning to journal editing in 1889 with La petite revue belge for young readers. The following year, she embarked on her temperance campaign, publishing a brochure titled Le rôle de la femme dans la lutte contre l'alcoolisme (The Woman's Role in the Fight against Alcoholism), advising working-class women of their rights when faced with violence from their husbands. In 1899, she became one of the main figures in the Union des femmes belges contre l'alcoolisme (Union of Belgian Women against Alcoholism) which led to the establishment of cafés and restaurants without alcoholic drinks. Believing it would be easier to work towards moderate consumption rather than abstinence, in 1905 she founded the Alliance des femmes contre les abus de l'alcool.

Parent was more generally active in the women's movement, joining the Ligue belge du droit des femmes (Belgian League for Women's Rights) when it was founded in 1892. In 1897, she was one of the women who organized the Congrès féministe international de Bruxelles, chairing several sessions. In 1905, following the establishment of the Conseil national des femmes belges, she headed the hygiene section. Following the retirement of Marie Popelin in 1912, she also headed the Ligue belge du droit des femmes.

Together with other women's organizations, in 1914 she participated in the Union patriotique des femmes belges, calling for universal suffrage. Parent was one of the delegates at the Inter-Allied Women's Conference held in Paris from 10 February 1919 to develop women's topics for the Paris Peace Conference. In 1920, she founded and became president of the Ligue des femmes rationalistes which had a membership of 20,000.

Marie Parent died in 1934.
