= Ruth Atkinson (activist) =

New Zealand activist

- Born: Ruth Atkinson; 1861; New Plymouth, New Zealand
- Died: 1927 (aged 65–66); Hanmer Springs, New Zealand
- Occupations: community worker, temperance activist and suffragist

Ruth Atkinson (1861 – 19 May 1927) was a New Zealand activist who was involved in the Temperance movement and women's rights movement. From 1910 until her death was the president of the Women's Christian Temperance Union of New Zealand (WCTU NZ) branch in Nelson. In 1919, she was chosen by the organization to participate in the Inter-Allied Women's Conference, a parallel conference to the 1919 Paris Peace Conference.

== Early life ==
Ruth Atkinson was born in 1861 in New Plymouth, New Zealand to Jane Maria, "Maria" (née Richmond) and Arthur Atkinson. She was the middle child of five siblings, the others being Margaret (1856–1856), Edith Emily (b. 1858), Arthur Richmond (Jr.) (1863–1935) and Alice "Mabel" (1864–1935). In 1867, the family moved to Nelson, where her father became a lawyer and was active in business and politics. In 1871, with the completion of Fairfield, the family moved into their new home on Trafalgar Street. They were Unitarians and progressive, supporting women's education and votes for women, and all family members were active in the Temperance Society. The early education of the children was in Nelson, but in 1877, Maria took all three of her daughters to England to study. Ruth was enrolled in the boarding school run by Octavia Hill. Having completed her schooling in March 1879, Ruth and Mabel moved with their mother to Bristol, while Edie returned to New Zealand with her father. In October, mother and daughters traveled to Syrgenstein, Germany, to visit a family friend and then made their way to Florence, Venice, and Brindisi, to board a ship to Suez. From Egypt, they sailed on the Rotorua arriving in Wellington on 7 January 1881.

== Activism ==
Upon returning to Nelson, Atkinson became active in Prohibition and initiatives of the Baptist Church. She also was active in politics, campaigning in 1896 for her brother's run as a Member of Parliament for the Wellington City electorate and in 1908 was an outspoken advocate in the No License campaign. In 1910 and 1911, she served as vice president of the national Women's Christian Temperance Union New Zealand (WCTU NZ), simultaneously beginning her leadership of the Nelson Branch of the WCTU. Atkinson's mother died in 1914, at the beginning of the war and Fairfield became Ruth's primary responsibility. During the war, she sponsored charitable events at her home, including the Nelson College Old Girls Association's fundraiser for the British Belgian Relief Fund. Newspapers of the time regularly carried reports of her efforts to raise money and the activities for the Belgian Fund. By 1916, Atkinson was serving as Vice-President of the national WCTU, but left that year in December for England for health reasons.

Atkinson did not return to New Zealand until December 1919. Her sister Mabel was working in England as a nurse and though her health did not permit Atkinson to be very active, she hosted New Zealanders on leave in England during her stay. She also distributed temperance materials for the British Women's Temperance Association. In early 1919, while Atkinson was in France, she was sent as a delegate of the New Zealand WCTU to attend the Inter-Allied Women's Conference, a parallel conference to the 1919 Paris Peace Conference. During one of the February sessions, Atkinson tabled a motion on behalf of the British Dominions Women Citizens' Union asking that the women delegates demand from the Peace Conference delegates women's enfranchisement, address working conditions, and appoint an international commission to address the issues which concerned women and children. She remained in Paris until the end of the conference in April and then boarded the Bremen in Southampton to return home.

In 1920, Atkinson returned to her presidency of the Nelson WCTU and was involved in an anti-gambling campaign. Mabel returned from England in 1921 and until 1922, lived with Atkinson at Fairfield. The sisters then sold their home to Nelson College for Girls and built a new home, Cranford on Brougham Street.

== Death and legacy ==
Atkinson died on 19 May 1927 at the Queen Mary Hospital in Hanmer Springs following an illness of several months. Her funeral was widely attended by members of the WCTU and she was buried on 22 May at the Wakapuaka Cemetery, alongside other family members. She was remembered for her long-involvement in social welfare projects.
