= Graziella Sonnino =

- Born: Graziella Sonnino Carpi; November 11, 1884; Italy
- Died: Milan, Italy
- Other names: Graziell Sonnino
- Years active: 1916-1938
- Known for: peace, women's right activist, anti-fascist

Graziella Sonnino Carpi (born 11 November 1884; also known as Graziell Sonnino) was an Italian feminist and peace activist in the interwar period. She was a member of the Italian Unione Femminile Nazionale (eng. National Women's Union) and a delegate to the 1919 Women's Conference.

== Activism ==
=== Inter-Allied Women's Conference 1919 ===
In 1919, Sonnino was an Italian delegate to the Inter-Allied Women's Conference in Paris. Women representatives of women's suffrage organizations sought to introduce women's issues and to the peace discussions at end of the First World War. The Women's Conference was a parallel conference to the Paris Peace Conference.

There was an international rise in anti-war feeling in Europe in 1919 and a widespread demand for the vote for women.

=== National women's union (anti fascist) work in Italy 1919-1938 ===
Sonnino served in the Women's Union (UNF) together with Nina Sullam Rignano and Ada Treves Segre. They worked on creating a school for retraining women who had been dismissed from the factories where they had replaced men during the First World War. The men had now returned from the front and the women lost the factory work.

The Women's Union had the aim of improving conditions for women by protection in the workplace for women workers, the right to divorce, the right to vote, the right to search for paternity of children.

The feminist movement was set back in 1922 when Benito Mussolini came to power. Mussolini said that women's primary role to be mothers while men were warriors. To increase birthrates, the Italian Fascist government gave financial incentives to women who raised large families and reduced the number of women employed. However, Mussolini's policies created many women's organizations, and this encouraged women to participate in politics and civic life.

== Later life ==
In July 1938, Sonnino left the Unione femminile for family reasons. By the following December, the Unione had replaced all its Jewish members with Aryans. Records indicate that, as a Jew, she moved from Italy to Switzerland until the end of the war.

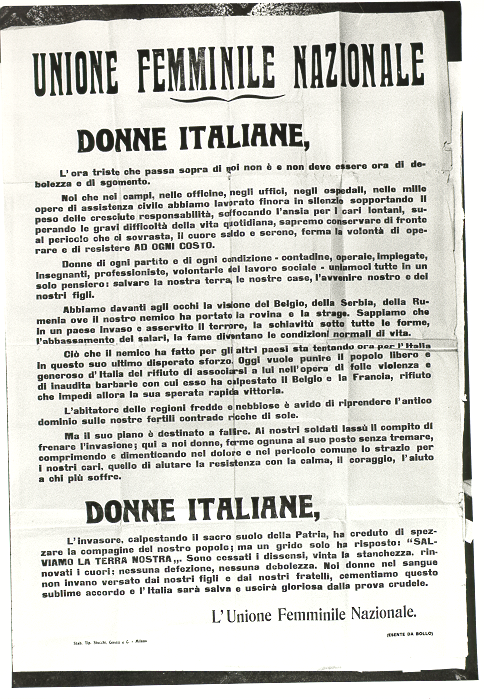
Unione femminile nazionale ( UFN) National Women's Union founding document calling on Italian women to join.

Sonnino, in an account of an interview in 1956, related how the Jews had suffered under the Fascists, indicating that she had returned to Milan from Switzerland after the end of World War II.

== See also ==
=== Books ===
- Graziella Gaballo, Il nostro dovere. L'Unione femminile tra impegno sociale, guerra e fascismo (1899-1939), Our duty.The Women's National Union: social commitment, war and fascism (1899-1939) Joker edizioni, 2015 A history of the National Women's Union.
- Diventare cittadine : il voto delle donne in Italia. 1996 Rossi-Doria A history of the right to vote for women in Italy.
