= Marguerite Pichon-Landry =

French feminist

- Marguerite Pichon-Landry in 1913
- Born: 1877
- Died: 1972 (aged 94–95)
- Occupation: Feminist
- Known for: President of the National Council of French Women

Marguerite Pichon-Landry (French pronunciation: [maʁɡəʁit piʃɔ̃ lɑ̃dʁi]; 1877–1972) was a French feminist who was president of the National Council of French Women from 1932 to 1952.

== Early years ==
Marguerite Landry was born in 1877 to a family of radical socialist intellectuals. Her mother was Augustine Meuron (1844-1926). Her aunt was Aglaé Meuron (1836-1925). Her great-grandfather François-Timothée Landry (c. 1769–1805) was a naval officer. Her father Timothée Landry (1841–1912) was a lawyer who became prosecutor in Paris towards the end of his career. Of her brothers, Eugène Landry (1872–1913) was a man of letters, and the demographer Adolphe Landry (1874–1956) was a government minister several times. Her twin sister Marie Long-Landry (1877–1968) was a doctor of medicine and was the first woman to head a clinic. Her sister Lasthénie Thuillier-Landry (1879–1962) was also a doctor of medicine and founded the Association of Women Physicians (Association des femmes médecins).

Marguerite Landry studied law at university. In 1903 she married the lawyer Charles-Adolphe Pichon, who became the secretary of Raymond Poincaré. They had one daughter, Amy (1905–92), who was a doctor of medicine and married Jean Bernard (1907–2006).

== Feminist leader ==
During World War I (1914–18) Marguerite Pichon-Landry was in charge of the information office for dispersed families. From 1914 to 1927 she chaired the Legislation section of the National Council of French Women (CNFF: Conseil National des femmes françaises). She joined the French Union for Women's Suffrage (UFSF: Union française pour le suffrage des femmes), and was vice-president of the UFSF until the end of the 1930s. The Musée social was an organization of prominent upper- and middle-class social reformers. Its Section d'Études Féminines (Section of Women's Studies) was founded in 1916. Pichon-Landry and Cécile Brunschvicg both joined.

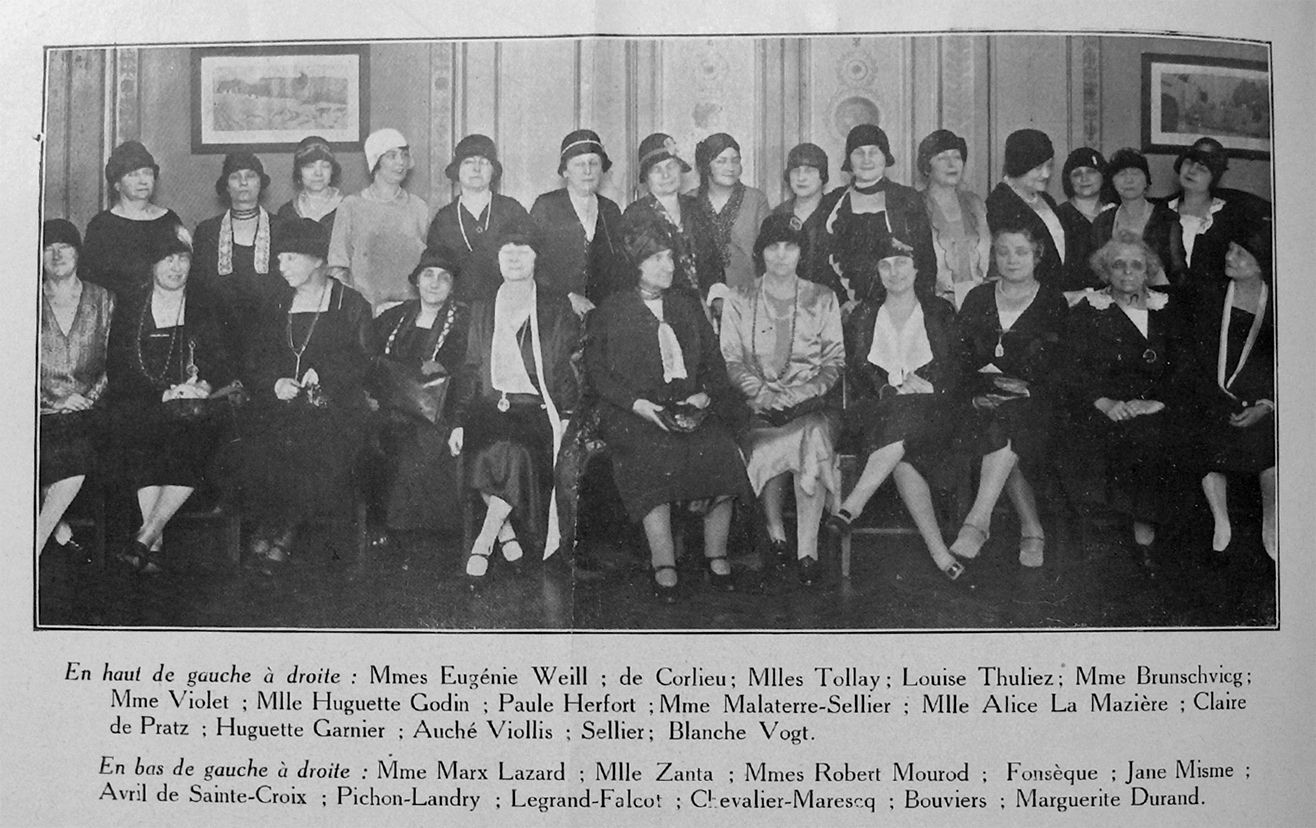
Etats généraux du féminisme 1929. Pichon-Landry is in light suit in the front row, center.

In January 1919 a 38-member extra-parliamentary committee on girl's secondary education ignored the objections of most of its six women members and recommended retaining the "feminine" features of girl's secondary education.

In May 1919 the French Chamber of Deputies voted for unrestricted woman suffrage by 344 to 97. Women assumed they would soon get the vote. Cecile Brunschvicg and Marguerite Pichon Landry, leading members of the CNFF and UFSF, brought the women's objections to the education commission to the attention of government ministers. Pichon-Landry and Henry Hébrard de Villeneuve of the Council of State surveyed the postwar hiring practices of administration. Pichon-Landry reported in March 1920 to a joint meeting of the legislative and women's sections of the Musée. Pichon-Ladry made the point that the "sedentary" and "regular nature of administrative work allowed women to combine a job with familial duties." With the economy struggling to recover from the effect of the war, she said, "since everyone, today, recognizes the need to increase production, the reservation of positions to men should not divert some men from more directly productive careers." The members of the Musée social endorsed full equality of the sexes throughout the administration.

In mid-1922 the Senate refused to ratify the decision to give women the vote. Pichon-Landry became general secretary of the CNFF in 1929, and was president from 1932 to 1952. She replaced Avril de Sainte-Croix as CNFF president. Through the connections of her brother, the government minister Adolphe Landry, she had privileged access to the political elite. The CNFF stated that it had 150,000 members in 1929, 300,000 in 1936 and 200,000 in 1939. These figures are probably exaggerated.

In 1935 the CNFF had 300,000 members and the UFSF had 100,000. These two organizations combined with fifteen other organizations to take unified action in response to any threat to the right of women to work. In February 1936 Pichon-Landry and Brunschvicg, representing the CNFF and UFSF respectively, addressed premier Albert Sarraut and met Jean Zay, his under-secretary. They asked that the general rules for hiring for all ministries be based on professional merits rather than sex. They conceded that there could be special cases, such as the defense ministries, where gender distinction could be justified. On 3 July 1936 the Council of State ruled that women had the "legal capacity" to compete for administrative positions, despite not having the vote, but the government could decide "whether the interests of a service necessitate, within a ministry, restrictions on the admission and advancement of female personnel." This waiver could be used by the War ministry to reserve the higher-level positions for men.

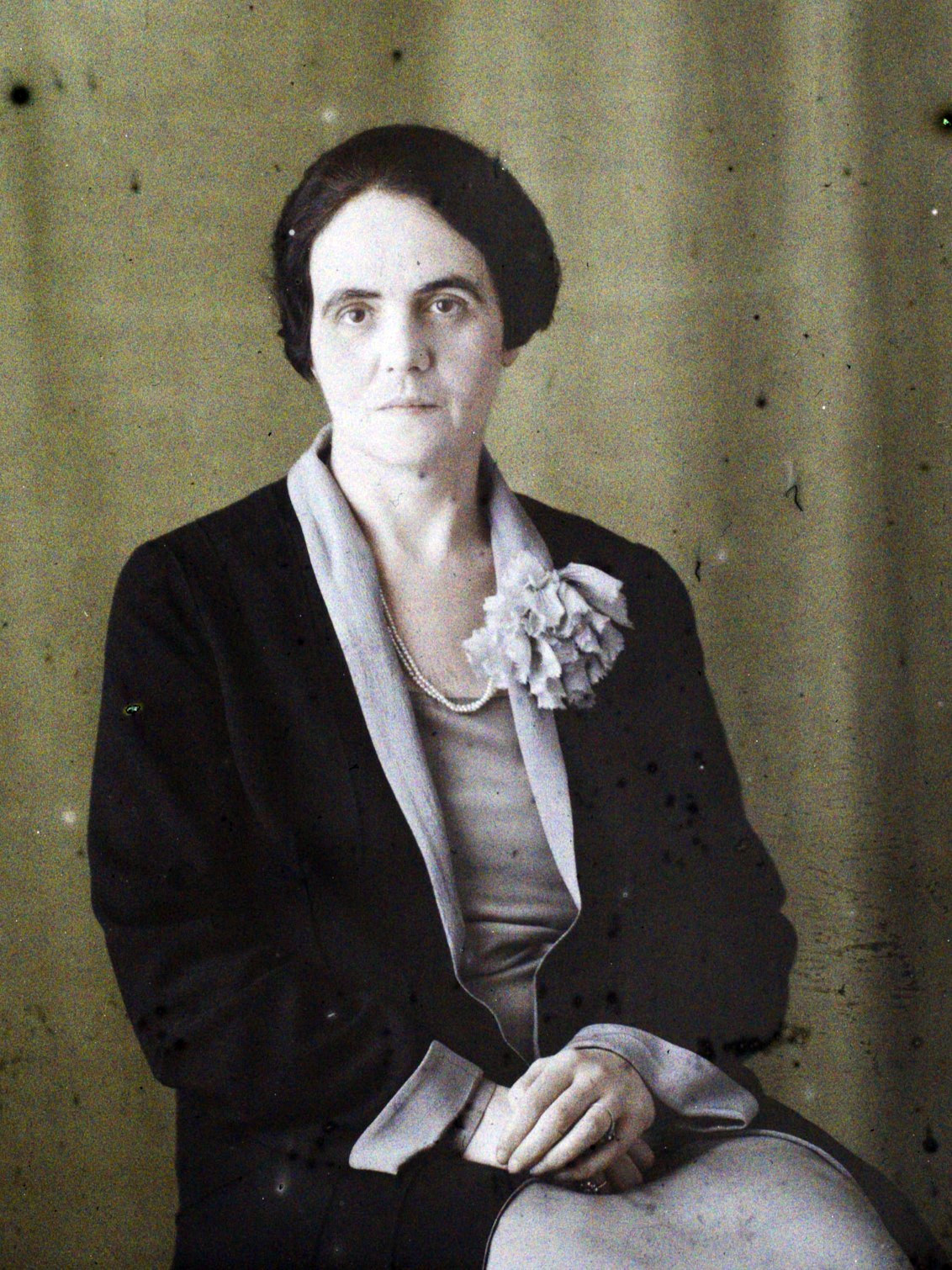
Autochrome portrait by Auguste Léon, 1927

Pichon-Landry helped found the Federal Union of Consumption (Union fédérale de la consommation), now the Federal Consumer's Union (Union fédérale des consommateurs in 1951. She received the Resistance Medal and was made a Knight of the Legion of Honour. She became head of the United Nations Commission on the Status of Women. Marguerite Pichon-Landry died in 1972.

== Selected publications ==
- M. Pichon-Landry (1908). Evaluation du travail ménager de la femme: Rapport fait à la Section de Législation du Conseil National des Femmes (in French). Dole : Impr. Paul Audebert. p. 20.
- Raoul Allier; Mme de Barjeau; Ferdinand Buisson; Ferdinand Gache; Charles Gide; Élie Gounelle; Paul Goy; Mme E. Pieczynska; Mme Pichon-Landry; Mme Jules Siegfried; Charles Wagner (1914). La Famille, échos du VIe Congrès national de l'Étoile blanche (Rouen, 1-2 novembre 1913) (in French). Cahors et Alençon : impr. de A. Coueslant. p. 224.
- Pauline Rebour; Marguerite Pichon-Landry (1918). La femme et la loi [Woman and the Law]. Emile Morière. p. 8.
- Marguerite Pichon-Landry (1920). Le Congrès féministe de Genève: conférence de Mme Pichon-Landry, présidence de M. Joseph Barthélémy, séance du lundi 12 juillet 1920. Comité national d'études sociales et politiques.
- Marguerite Pichon-Landry (1923). Le Suffrage des femmes en pratique. 1923... Édition française (2e édition). Documents réunis par : Dr Margh. Ancona, Mme Julie Arenholt, Mlle Émilie Gourd, Miss Chrystal Macmillan, Mme Pichon-Landry. Avant-propos de Mrs. Chapman Catt. Union française pour le suffrage des femmes. p. 192.

== Sources ==
- Christine Bard (2015). "Marguerite Pichon-Landry (1878-1972)". Université d'Angers, IUF. Archived from the original on 2016-03-04.
- Clark, Linda L. (2000-12-21). The Rise of Professional Women in France: Gender and Public Administration since 1830. Cambridge University Press. ISBN 978-1-139-42686-2.
- "Fonds Marguerite Pichon-Landry". Archives de la FMSH (in French).
- Guéraiche, William (1999-01-01). Les femmes et la République: essai sur la répartition du pouvoir de 1943 à 1979 (in French). Editions de l'Atelier. ISBN 978-2-7082-3468-0.
- Janz, Oliver; Schonpflug, Daniel (2014-04-15). Gender History in a Transnational Perspective: Networks, Biographies, Gender Orders. Berghahn Books. ISBN 978-1-78238-275-1.
- Offen, Karen (Autumn 1983). "The Second Sex and the Baccalauréat in Republican France, 1880-1924". French Historical Studies. 13 (2). Duke University Press: 252–286. doi:10.2307/286452. JSTOR 286452.
- Offen, Karen (December 2005). "La plus grande féministe de France ». Mais qui est donc Madame Avril de Sainte-Croix ?". Bulletin Archives du Féminisme (in French) (9). translator: Michèle Bruhat. Archived from the original on 2014-10-13.
- Riot-Sarcey, Michèle (October–December 1997). "Review: Christine Bard, Les filles de Marianne, Histoire des feéminismes, 1914-1940". Revue d'histoire moderne et contemporaine. 44 (4). Societe d'Histoire Moderne et Contemporaine. JSTOR 20530302.
- Sauvageot, Jacqueline (2006). Ella Sauvageot: l'audace d'une femme de presse, 1900-1962. Editions de l'Atelier. ISBN 978-2-7082-3880-0.
