= Avril de Sainte-Croix =

French feminist and author (1855–1939)

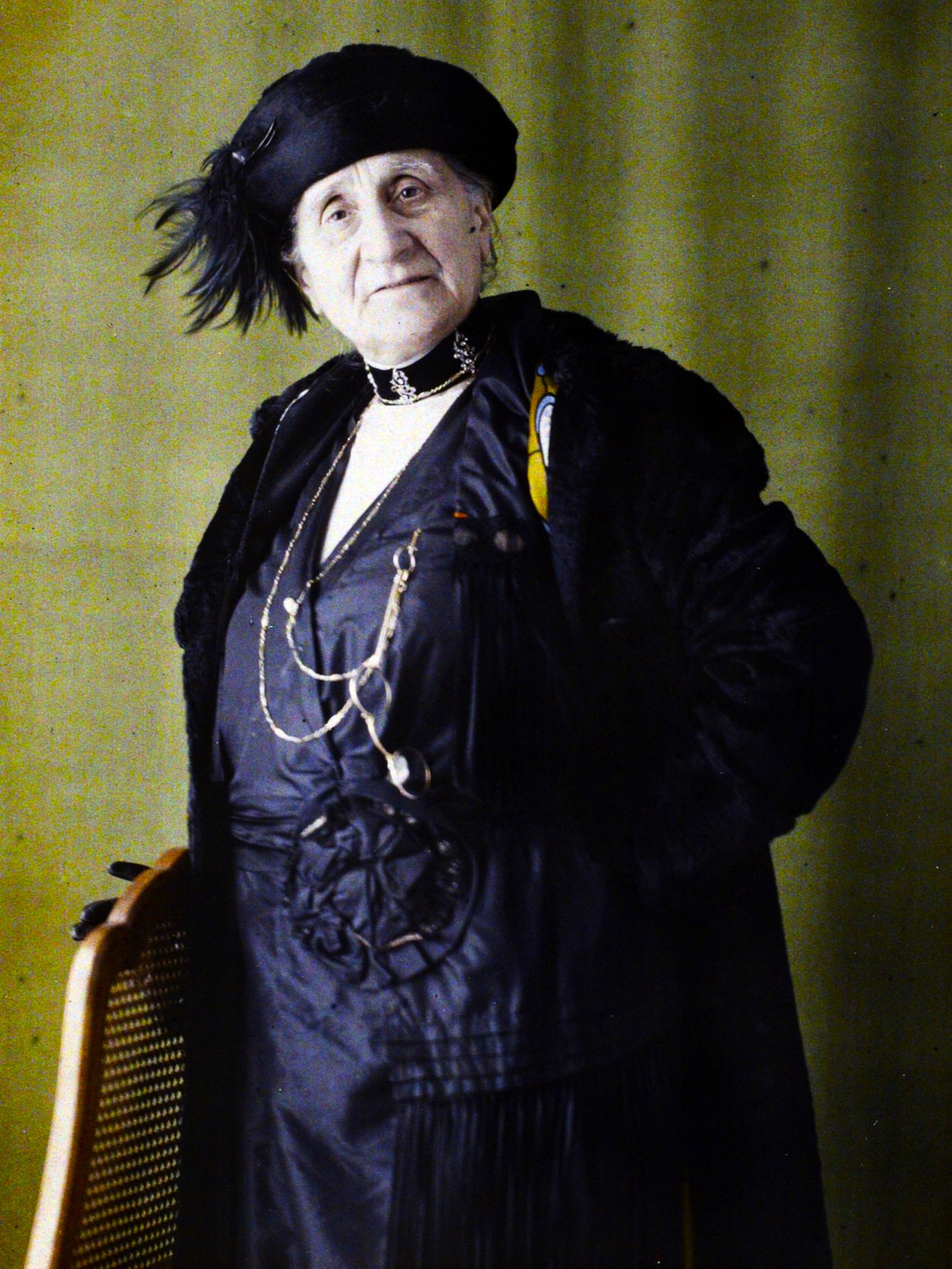
- Autochrome portrait by Georges Chevalier, 1923
- Born: Adrienne-Pierrette-Eugénie Glaisette; 10 February 1855; Carouge, Canton of Geneva, Switzerland
- Died: 21 March 1939 (aged 84); Menton, Alpes-Maritimes, France
- Occupations: Philanthropist and feminist

Signature
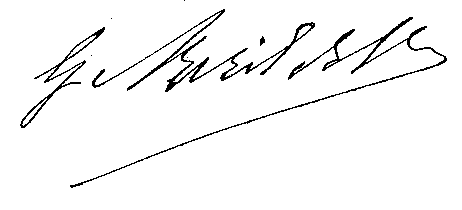

Ghénia Avril de Sainte-Croix (pen name, Savioz; pseudonym, de Sainte-Croix; 10 February 1855 – 21 March 1939) was a French author, journalist, feminist and pacifist. For many years she led the French branch of the International Abolitionist Federation, which sought to abolish state regulation of prostitution and fought trafficking in women. She advised the French government and the League of Nations on women's issues. She was also vice-president of the International Council of Women from 1920 and President of the National Council of French Women from 1922 to 1932.

== Life ==
=== Early years ===
Adrienne-Pierrette-Eugénie (Ghénia) Glaisette was born in 1855 in the village of Carouge near Geneva, Switzerland, to Marc Glaisette and Marie-Louise Savuiz. She spoke several languages and traveled widely. As a young woman she seems to have spent much time in central Europe. Her portrait by Teodor Axentowicz was exhibited in the Salon in 1893, and published in La jeune Dame. She was mentioned in society newspapers. The Gentlewoman reports her presence at a matinee dance given the Baroness de Montebello, apparently her aunt. In the mid-1890s she published a series of children's stories set in Eastern Europe. She signed the stories and her first newspaper articles "Savioz". (Note: Her literary pseudonym "Savioz" was derived from her mother's maiden name Savuiz. She took the pseudonym "de Sainte-Croix" (of the Holy Cross) for her feminist activities. After her marriage to François Avril she became known as Madame G. Avril de Sainte-Croix. The "G" could stand for Ghénia, a diminutive form of Eugénie, or could stand for her maiden name of Glaisette.) The Parisian newspapers reported that she was present at the celebrations of the Cuban War of Independence (1895–1898) organized by the Cuban colony of Paris.

Sainte-Croix came from the haute société protestante (Protestant high society) and shared its philanthropic tradition. In the 1890s she began to participate in the Conference of Versailles, an annual meeting of Protestant women's charities. Representatives of social reform groups fighting pornography, alcoholism and prostitution spoke at these conferences. It was through this that she became involved in the abolitionist campaign to end government-regulated prostitution. Starting in the late 1890s she began to publish journalistic investigations into the plight of prostitutes and working women. Sainte-Croix wrote for La Fronde, which was founded late in 1897, as did Marguerite Durand, Séverine, Marie Bonnevial and Clémence Royer. She published a remarkable article in this paper on the conditions in the prison of Saint-Lazare, where prostitutes were held. She spoke on the question of female journalists at the 1899 congress of the International Council of Women (ICW) in London.

Eugénie Glaisette married the civil engineer François Avril in a civil ceremony in May 1900 when she was aged 45. They lived at 1 avenue Malakoff (now avenue Raymond Poincaré) in the 16th arrondissement of Paris, in an apartment overlooking the place du Trocadéro. The marriage did nothing to reduce her activism. No doubt it was due to her husband that she was able to hold several feminist meetings in the Civil Engineers premises at 19 rue Blanche.

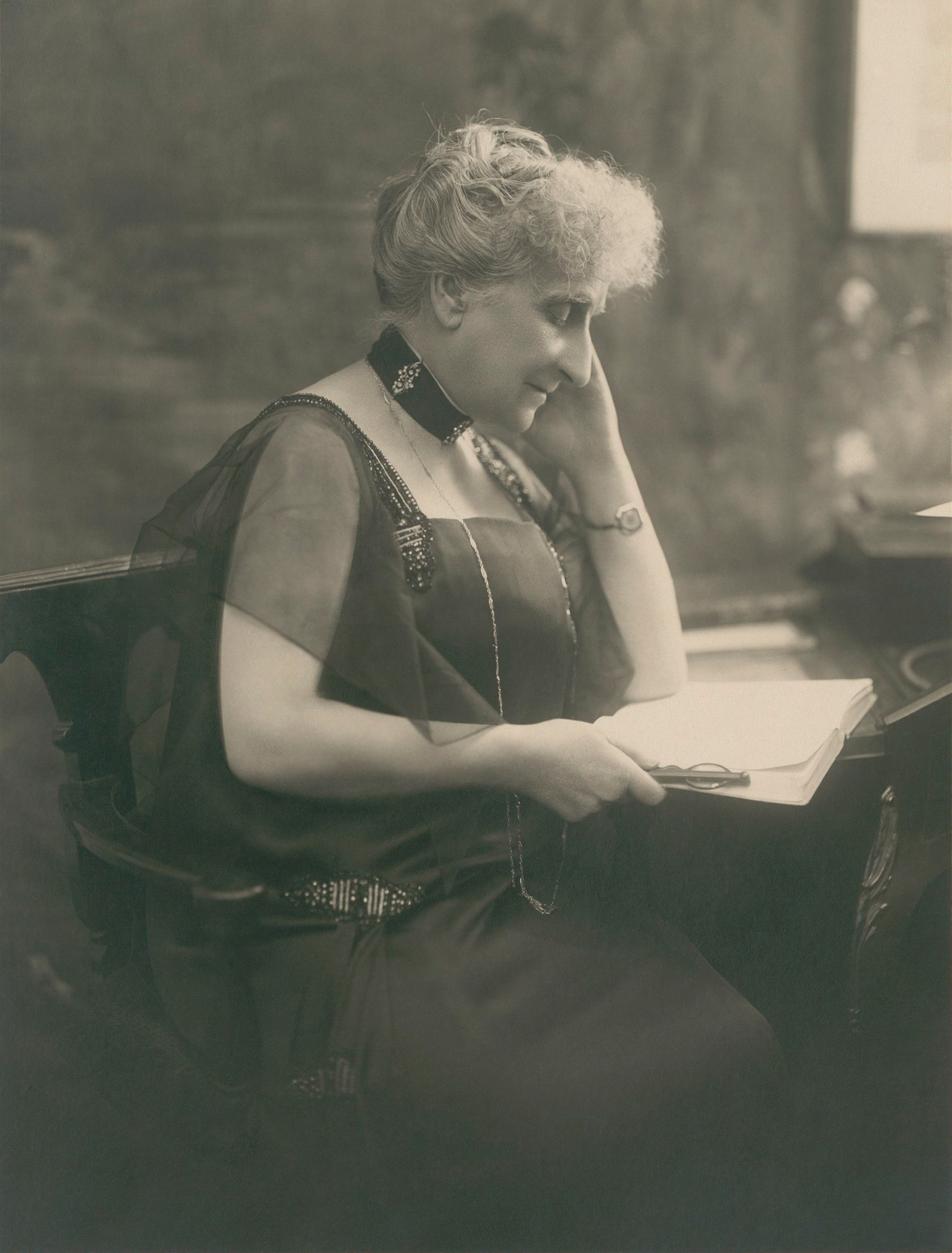
Sainte-Croix as President of the National Council of French Women

=== Feminist leader ===
Sainte-Croix headed the French branch of the International Abolitionist Federation (IAF) for many years from 1900, while also acting as secretary general of the National Council of French Women (Conseil National des Femmes Françaises; CNFF) from 1903 onward. She founded the halfway house Œuvre Libératrice (Liberating Work) in 1901 to help young women leave prostitution after their release from prison. The charity gave them education, job training and long term counselling. In 1904 she spoke in Zurich and Geneva on the subject of trafficking in women. Between 1904 and 1908 she was a member of a government commission to investigate the activities of the vice squad. She was the only woman to serve on this commission.

From 1905 to 1907 Sainte-Croix was a member of the independent Coulon-Chavagnes commission that studied the marital laws in France, under which women were disadvantaged, with a view to overhauling the civil code. She was a founding member and member of the board of the League of Human Rights and the Citizen (Ligue des Droits de l'Homme et du Citoyen). Sainte-Croix published a stream of articles promoting the cause of women. In 1907 she published a book entitled Le Féminisme in which she refuted the arguments of Catholics and nationalists that feminism was "un-French". She made the case that the movement had its roots in the fight for liberty of the French Revolution.

During World War I (1914–1918) Sainte-Croix supported the war effort by founding canteens to feed women working in the war industries. In 1917 she was appointed to the Committee on Women's Employment to advise the government on women workers. She founded and became chairperson of the women's section of the Musée social, and in 1918–19 went on a trip to the United States for the Musée to investigate part-time work for women in four American cities. During this trip she met President Woodrow Wilson and former President Theodore Roosevelt. After World War I she traveled in Poland, Czechoslovakia, Austria, Hungary and Romania. In 1920 she became vice-president of the ICW and in 1922 she became president of the CNFF.

Sainte-Croix attended and spoke at congresses in London, Berlin, Geneva, Rome, Kristiana (Oslo), Bucharest, Vienna, Spain and the US. In the 1920s and 1930s she was internationally recognized as the leading feminist in France. In April 1922 she was appointed to the Standing Advisory Committee of the League of Nations on trafficking of women and children. She was also appointed to the League's commission for the protection of children. From 1925 she was delegate to the League of Nations for the Joint Standing Committee of Women's International Organizations. She was named chevalier and officier of the Legion of Honour, and received medals from the ministries of health and hygiene. By the time the States General of Feminism was held in 1931 Avril de Sainte-Croix was 76 years old, and exhausted. She died after a short illness in March 1939 in Menton on the French Riviera. She was aged 84.

== Organizer ==
=== International Abolitionist Federation ===
In 1897 Josephine Butler visited France, and a group led by Auguste de Morsier initiated re-foundation of a French branch of the International Abolitionist Federation (IAF) which campaigned for revocation of laws that regulated prostitution. The new organization was represented officially at the international abolitionist conference in London in 1898. Sainte-Croix attended this conference, where she met Butler. Between 1898 and 1907 the abolitionist movement in France revived, led first by Auguste de Morsier and then by Ghénia Avril de Sainte-Croix.

Sainte-Croix and other feminists thought the regulation of prostitution was amoral in tolerating vice and enforcing a double standard of morality, and also unjust and ineffective. She saw prostitutes as "female serfs". She strongly advocated increasing women's wages so they would no longer be forced to sell their bodies, and creating a strict code of morality that would apply equally to men and women. In September 1899 she participated in an IAF conference in Geneva, and reported on the proceedings in La Fronde. At the Congress on Women's Rights in 1900 she read one of the three opening reports, calling for abolition of legalized prostitution and of the double standard of morality. She became secretary-general of the French branch of the IAF in 1900, and remained active in the movement until the mid-1930s.

=== National Council of French Women (CNFF) ===
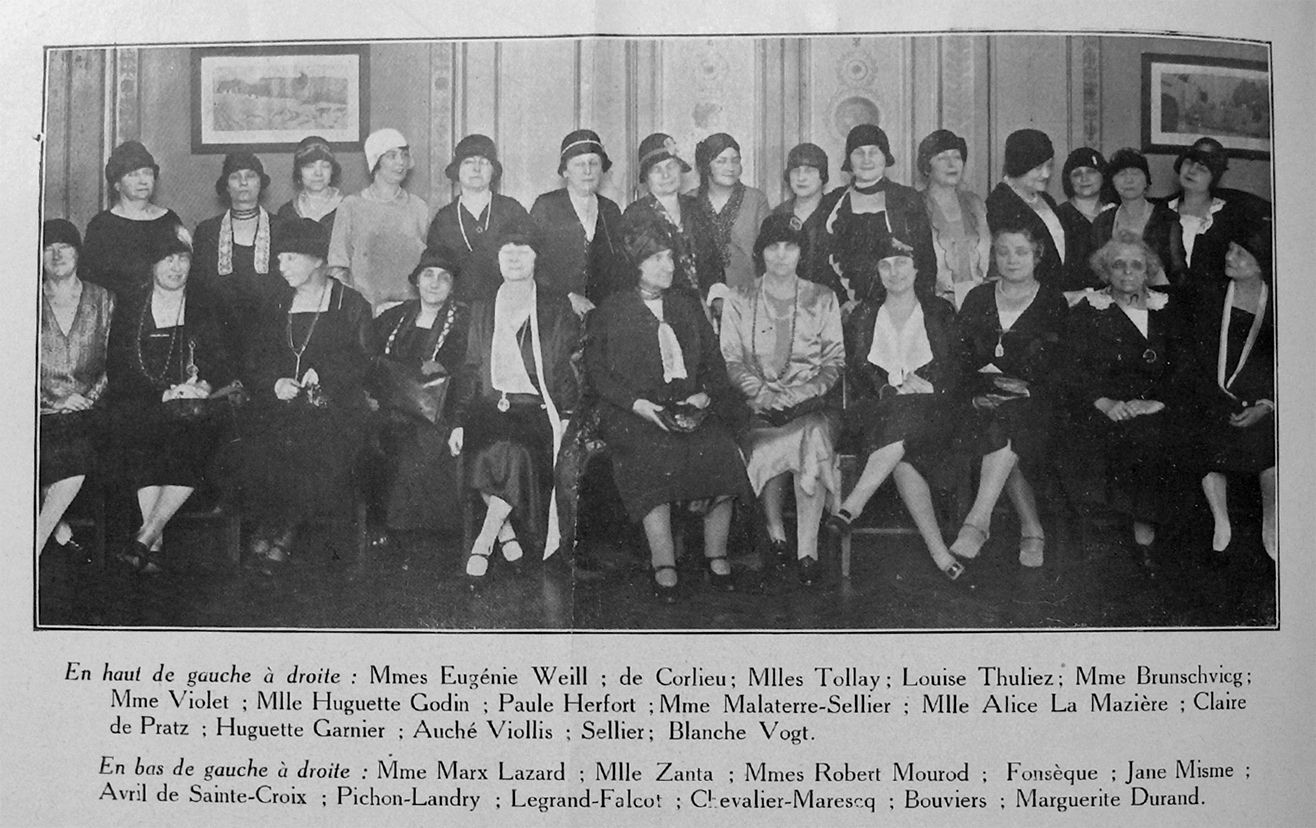
Etats généraux du féminisme 1929. Sainte-Croix is in the front row, center, looking towards the right.

In March 1900 Sainte-Croix organized a banquet at the Grand Hôtel de Paris in honor of the feminist scholar Clémence Royer, whom she greatly admired. In 1900 she presided over the "Work" section of the Congress of Female Works and Institutions, where she argued passionately for equality of male and female pay and for strong laws on child labor. From 1902 she was a strong advocate of women's suffrage in the National Council of French Women (CNFF). In 1903 Sainte-Croix was secretary general of the CNFF and also of the French branch of the IAF, which she ran from her home at 1 Avenue Malakoff.

In 1919 Sainte-Croix and the CNFF engaged in a campaign to convince the Allied leaders at the Versailles Peace Conference to address women and their problems in the charter of the new League of Nations, with partial success. The CNFF also worked to convince the French senators to pass the bill for women's suffrage. Sainte-Croix organized the CNFF congress in Strasbourg in October 1919. In 1922 she succeeded Julie Siegfried as president of the CNFF, holding this position until 1932 when she was replaced by Marguerite Pichon-Landry. Sainte-Croix campaigned in 1927 to have women admitted to the police force. She presided over the CNFF's États-Généraux du Féminisme (Note: The term "Estates General" (Etats Généraux) of Feminism is a reference to the Estates-General of 1789 which launched the French Revolution.) congresses in 1929, 1930 and 1931. These congresses focused in successive years on women's legal rights, economic standing and position in the colonies.

=== International Council of Women (ICW) ===
In 1899 Sainte-Croix assisted at a conference of the International Council of Women (ICW), which was headed by Lady Aberdeen. In 1904 she attended the ICW meetings in Berlin with Marguerite Durand and Sarah Monod, where she spoke of the support the CNFF was giving to working women. That year she chaired the ICW committee of White Slave Traffic and Equal Moral Standard. In 1906 she received Lady Aberdeen and the leaders of the ICW in Paris. Sainte-Croix attended the ICW congress in Rome in 1914. In 1920 she was elected vice president of the ICW at the congress in Kristiana, Norway. Sainte-Croix made a tour of Europe in 1924, then returned via Canada to the United States in 1925 for the sixth ICW conference in Washington, D.C. In 1930 she attended the ICW congress in Vienna.

== Religion and politics ==
It is not clear whether Sainte-Croix was Protestant or simply associated with Protestants. She was not a practicing Protestant, and described herself as a free thinker. She was anti-Catholic, but in favor of religious freedom. She has belonged to the International and mixed Masonic Order Le Droit Humain which included other feminists mentioned above. She was a strong supporter of Alfred Dreyfus during the Dreyfus affair.

Despite being an advocate of working women, Sainte-Croix was hostile to socialism or communism, unlike activists such as Louise Saumoneau and Louise Bodin. She thought that all women should show solidarity regardless of their class, and well-off women should assist the poorer women. She saw poverty as one of the main causes of prostitution, and thought women should be given enough pay to meet their needs, but was against legislation to protect workers. From 1900 she spoke in opposition to state intervention in women's work. After the Russian Revolution in 1917 she wrote several articles that criticized "collectivization" of women by the Bolsheviks.

== Publications ==
Publications include:

- Mlle de Sainte-Croix (1895). Les Aventures de Toto, suivi de Histoire de Biribi. Paris: Libr.-impr. réunies. p. 32.
- Mlle de Sainte-Croix (1895). Contes russes. Paris: Libr.-impr. réunies. p. 47.
- Mlle de Sainte-Croix (1896). Les Crimes d'un perroquet... Paris: Libr.-impr. réunies. p. 32.
- Mme Avril de Sainte-Croix (1907). Le féminisme. Paris: V. Giard et E. Brière. p. 219.
- Mme Avril de Sainte-Croix (1913). L'Esclave blanche, discours prononcés le 15 avril 1913 à l'Hôtel des Sociétés savantes contre la réglementation de la prostitution. Alençon: A. Coueslant. p. 46.
- Mme Avril de Sainte-Croix (1918). L'Education sexuelle. Preface by M. le professeur Pinard. Paris: F. Alcan. p. 40.
- Mme Avril de Sainte-Croix; Ferdinand Buisson; Camille Guy (1926). Pauline Kergomard (1838-1925). Laval: Impr. de Barnéoud. p. 64.

== See also ==
- List of peace activists

== Sources ==
- Corbin, Alain (1 September 1996). Women for Hire: Prostitution and Sexuality in France After 1850. Harvard University Press. ISBN 978-0-674-95544-8.
- "Eugénie Avril de Sainte-Croix (1855-1939) - Auteur du texte". BNF.
- Gubin, Eliane (2004). Le siècle des féminismes (in French). Editions de l'Atelier. ISBN 978-2-7082-3729-2.
- Limoncelli, Stephanie (23 February 2010). The Politics of Trafficking: The First International Movement to Combat the Sexual Exploitation of Women. Stanford University Press. ISBN 978-0-8047-6294-6.
- Offen, Karen (December 2005). "La plus grande féministe de France ». Mais qui est donc Madame Avril de Sainte-Croix ?". Bulletin Archives du Féminisme (in French) (9). translator: Michèle Bruhat.
- Offen, Karen (15 July 2013). "Feminist Campaigns in "Public Space"". Civil Society And Gender Justice: Historical and Comparative Perspectives. Berghahn Books. ISBN 978-0-85745-421-8.
- Smith, Bonnie G. (2008). "Avril de Sainte-Croix, Ghénia". The Oxford Encyclopedia of Women in World History: 4 Volume Set. Oxford University Press. ISBN 978-0-19-514890-9.
- Waelti-Walters, Jennifer R.; Hause, Steven C. (1994). Feminisms of the Belle Epoque: A Historical and Literary Anthology. U of Nebraska Press. p. 10. ISBN 0-8032-9748-3.
- Wayne, Tiffany K. (2011). Feminist Writings from Ancient Times to the Modern World: A Global Sourcebook and History. ABC-CLIO. ISBN 978-0-313-34580-7.
