= Gaston Thomson =

French politician (1848–1932)

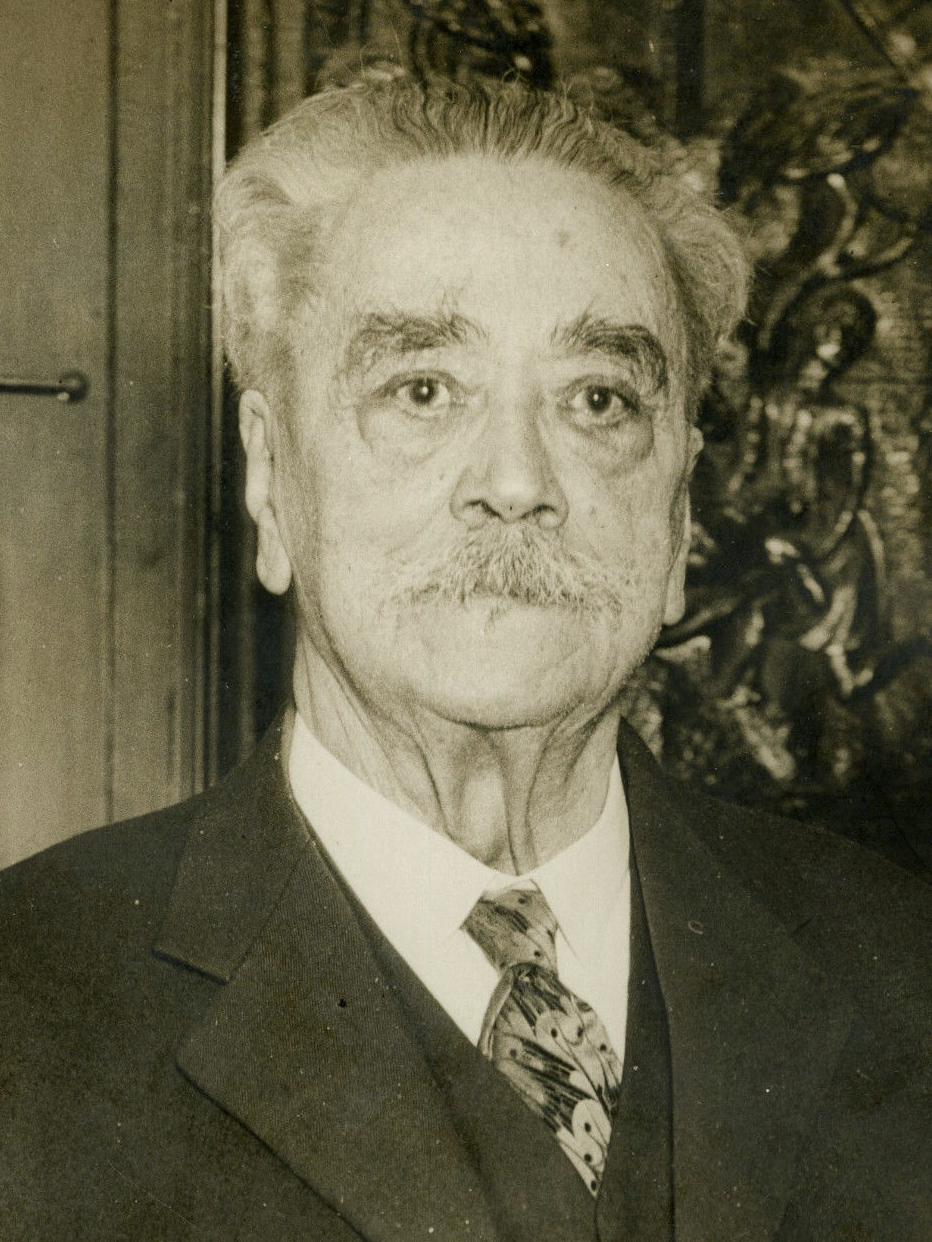
Thomson in 1932

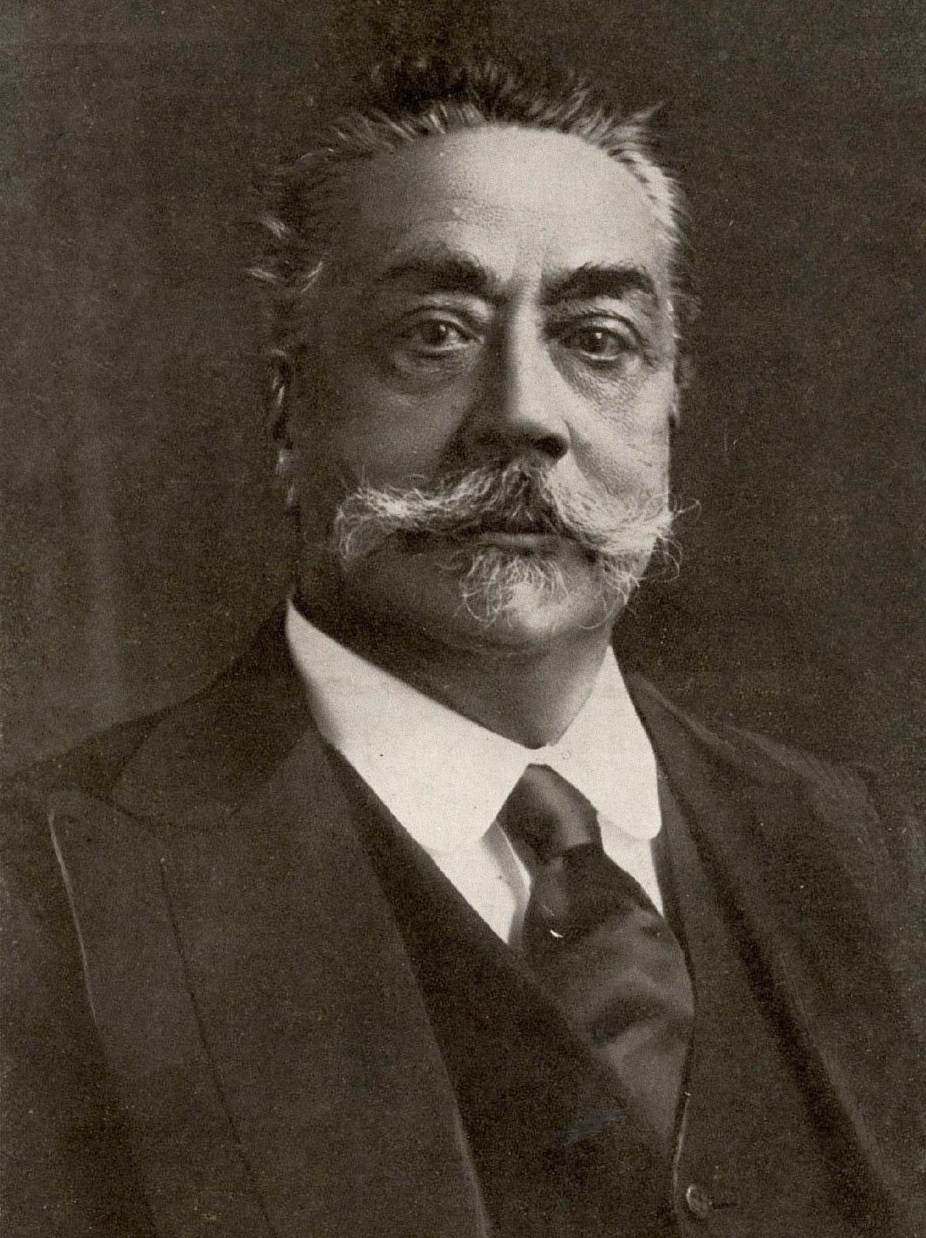
Thomson c. 1914-15

Gaston Thomson (29 January 1848 – 14 May 1932) was a French politician.

Thomson was born in Oran, French Algeria. He was a member of the French Chamber of Deputies for the Department of Constantine for fifty years and three months. He was Minister of Commerce, Industry, Posts and Telegraphs from 13 June 1914 to 29 October 1915. As Minister of the Navy in the Cabinets of Clemenceau and Rouvier, his tenure saw the construction of numerous warships, cruisers and battleships, improving the power of the French Navy.

On 6 June 1897 he fought a duel with fellow Deputy Leon Mirman, a Radical Socialist, in which Mirman was slightly wounded in the forearm. The duel grew out of an article written by the latter attacking Thomson.

He died in 1932 in at Bône (Algeria).
