= Marie Denizard =

French feminist activist (1872–1959)

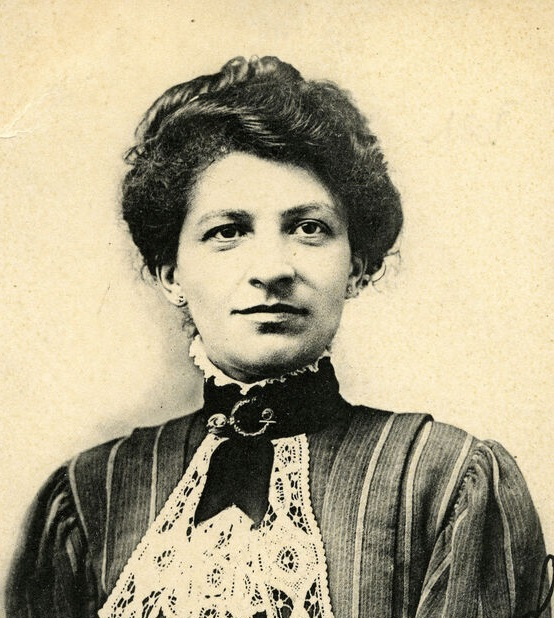
- Marie Denizard's publicity image from the 1913 French presidential election
- Born: 3 April 1872; Pontru, France
- Died: 21 May 1959 (aged 87); Leyme, France
- Known for: First woman to stand as a candidate in a French presidential election

Marie Eugénie Gabriel Denizard (3 April 1872 – 21 May 1959) was a French feminist activist. On 17 January 1913, she was the first woman to stand as a candidate in a French presidential election.

== Early life ==
Marie Denizard was born on 3 April 1872 in Pontru, the daughter of Marie-Sophie-Julie Lesourd, a dressmaker, and Charles-Joseph Denizard, a dentist. The Denizard family was originally from the Vermandois region, near Saint-Quentin (Aisne). Her brother Orens Denizard was an artist and political satirist.

Marie Denizard attended the Lycée de Jeunes Filles d'Amiens, now the Lycée Madeleine-Michelis. In the early 1910s, after living for a time in Pontru, she moved to 6 rue Saint-Martin in Amiens, with her mother, who worked as a culottière, and two younger sisters, Hélène (born 1885) and Madeleine (born 1887).

== Feminism ==
Denizard became involved in the feminist cause in the last years of the nineteenth century, and is thought to have contributed to Marguerite Durand's feminist publication La Fronde before 1910. She also contributed to MP Paul Dussaussoy's report in favour of women's suffrage, alongside other notable French female suffrage campaigners. The Napoleonic Code, established in 1804, declared the legal and political incapacity of women, and was seen as and used as a barrier to block attempts to improve women's political rights.

Denizard also belonged to a temperance league in Amiens called l'Étoile bleue.

Denizard announced her candidacy for the French Chamber of Deputies (parliament) in the 1910 French legislative election, standing in the constituency of Amiens. She stood on a platform demanding civil rights for women, campaigned against the damage that alcoholism caused amongst the working classes, and against child abandonment. However, as a woman, she was ineligible to stand for election, and ballot papers bearing her name were not counted among the votes cast. France only granted women the right to vote and stand in elections in 1944, with their first opportunity to use that right being on 29 April 1945.

The same year (1910), Denizard drafted a motion in favour of women's right to vote and stand for election, which Louis-Lucien Klotz, MP and Radical conseiller général for the canton of Rosières-en-Santerre, agreed to submit to the conseil général de la Somme, which adopted it unanimously on 30 September 1910. Denizard commented on and justified the text in an article published in Le Chambard d'Amiens.

Shortly afterwards, she published La Femme et la loi salique, the first in a series of studies dedicated to the women of Picardy, exploring women's rights before 1789.

In March 1911, Denizard sent a letter to the prefect of the Somme asking to be relieved of "all personal taxes and contributions" pointing out that since women were deprived of all political rights, they "should not have to suffer laws or pay taxes that they have not consented to". She argued that French women should not "be taxed in a personal capacity, either directly or indirectly, as a duty must always have as its immediate corollary the exercise of a right".

In April 1912, she wrote an article based on personal research in which she put forward the hypothesis of Jean-Baptiste Lully's Picard origins. The fanciful nature of this theory was demonstrated by Julien Tiersot in Le Ménestrel.

== Presidential candidacy ==
In Le Journal of 26 December 1912, the journalist Fernand Hauser wrote: "Feminists have sometimes claimed that Congress can elect a woman; this is a mistake. The text of the Constitution expressly states: 'The President of the Republic' in the masculine form; there can therefore be no doubt. However, the Assembly, being sovereign, would have the right to satisfy the wishes of women politicians; but let one of them stand for election, and see...".

Marie Denizard decided to take up the challenge and announced it to Hauser, who interviewed her and published her photograph on the front page of Le Journal on 4 January 1913. Denizard pointed out that there had already been female heads of state, citing the historical examples of the regents of the kingdom of France, alongside Empress Catherine the Great of Russia and Queen Victoria of the United Kingdom, as well as contemporary examples of Queen Wilhelmina of the Netherlands and Grand Duchess Marie-Adélaïde of Luxembourg. She told Hauser:

My candidacy is not as fanciful as one might think. It means that women have the right to take their share of government, since they pay their share of taxes: why shouldn't widows, bachelors and divorcees vote? Why shouldn't they be eligible? Why shouldn't married women have the right to replace their husbands in his civic rights, authorised by him, when he is failing, ill or absent?

Denizard's testimonial candidacy was not taken seriously by male journalists. The least sympathetic of them was the editorial writer Jean Ernest-Charles, who considered Denizard's "childish and ostentatious candidacy" and "compromising antics" akin to the British suffragettes, whose campaigns for women's rights he branded as "sickly eccentricities" attributed to "hysteria" caused "by too long a celibacy". Disapproval was also expressed among feminists: Marguerite Durand considered Denizard's candidacy to be nothing more than an "unfortunate joke" detrimental to the credibility of the feminist movement. Although she did not give Denizard much attention, Jane Misme's La Française journal was more sympathetic to this "simple demonstration of principle", which "achieved its propaganda goal", and stressed that the candidate was "a zealous and serious feminist".

Denizard even had ballot papers printed in her name and drafted a profession of faith that she sent to members of parliament. The New York Times covered her candidacy. The same month, she wrote an article for Arria Ly's Le Combat féministe.

== After 1913 ==
In 1914, Marie Denizard contributed to the Cri des femmes, a weekly for which she edited the Somme department's. However, she soon came into conflict with the paper's sponsor, Judge George Bonjean, who refused to pay her a fee.

Denizard's financial situation became precarious, and she could no longer pay the rent on the flat she and her mother occupied in rue Lavalard in Amiens. On 6 May 1914, she was arrested after making threatening remarks to the bailiff sent by her landlord. Imprisoned for a fortnight, she was charged with insulting behaviour and death threats. In La Française, journalist Alice Berthet called for solidarity with the former presidential candidate. The Ligue de défense des femmes provided her with a Parisian lawyer, Mr. Lenoble. In the end, the court was lenient and only sentenced her to a 25-franc suspended fine for contempt.

Later in 1914, she was evacuated to Bordeaux due to the First World War. She made pacifist statements during this period which were not approved by the political elite. Denizard was then placed under surveillance by the Direction de la Sûreté générale because of the resentment she expressed against her exclusion from political life. This surveillance continued after the war and her return to Paris.

Thereafter, Denizard was in the news much less. In November 1922, she sent a petition to the Senate in which she claimed to be a victim of abuse of power.

== Death and legacy ==
In 1926, at the request of the police commissioner of the Odéon district, Denizard was hospitalised for delusions of persecution and demands, the psychiatrist concluding that she had a complex psychosis. In 1928, she was transferred to the asylum at Leyme with a diagnosis of paranoia and "delusions of politico-social demands". Marie Denizard died on 21 May 1959 at the asylum in Leyme (Lot), after having been incarcerated there for 32 years.

Denizard's life was rediscovered by historian Prescillia Da Silva in 2023. On 20 May 2024, as part of the Journées du matrimoine (Heritage Days), a plaque in memory of Marie Denizard was unveiled at Pontru town hall.
