= Marguerite Dilhan =

French lawyer

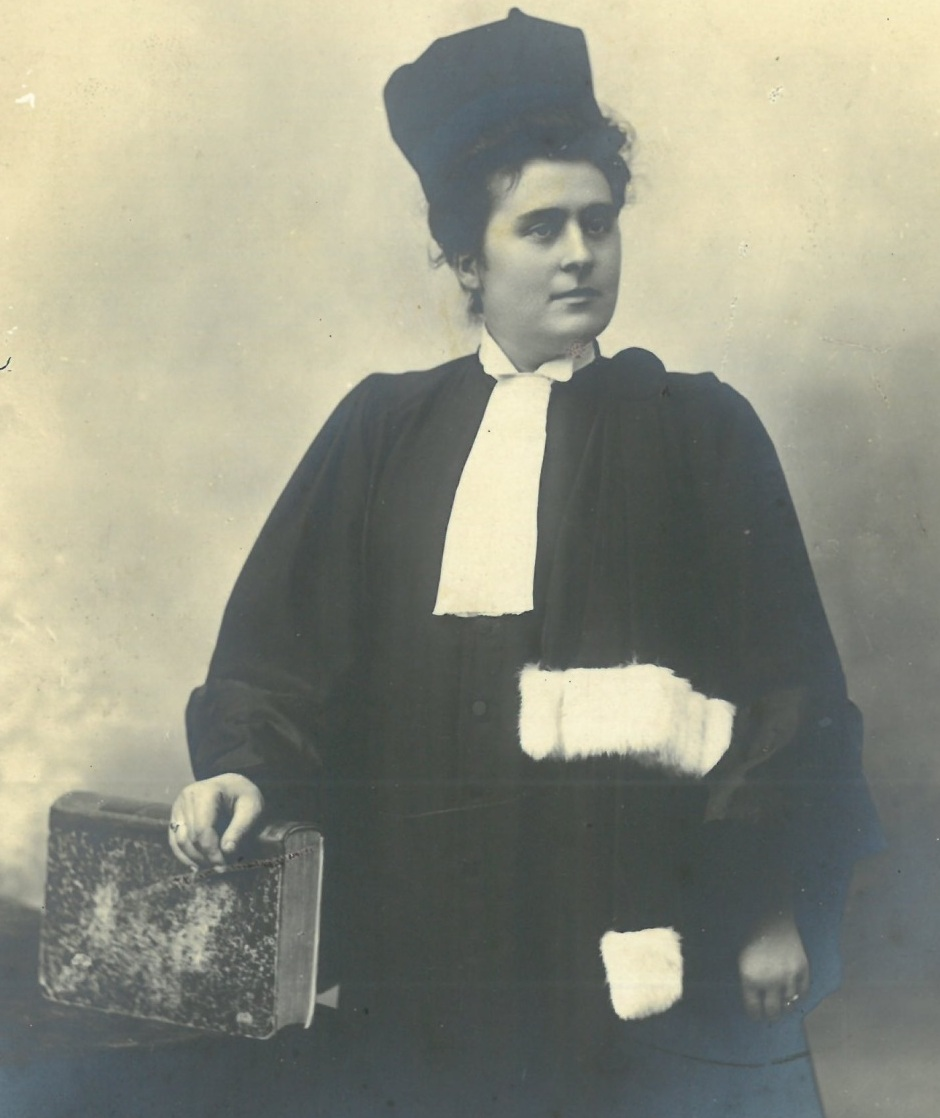
- Born: Julie Marguerite Dilhan; September 17, 1876; Miélan (Gers)
- Died: March 3, 1956 (aged 79); Toulouse
- Occupation: First woman lawyer to open her own law firm in France.
- Known for: First woman lawyer to plead in Cour d'Assises. Officier de la Légion d'honneur.

Signature
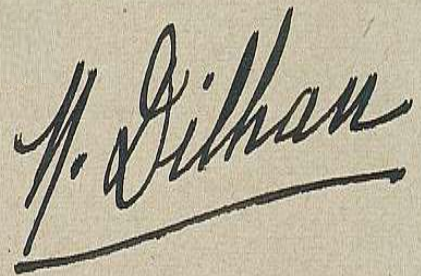

Marguerite Dilhan (17 September 1876 – 3 March 1956) was a French lawyer. She was the first woman in France to open her own practice and plead in a criminal Cour d'assises on November 26, 1903.

== Early life ==
Born on 17 September 1876 in Miélan, Gers, Julie Marguerite was the daughter of Ferdinand and Antoinette Cécile Valérie Ponsan, who had married on December 27, 1875, in Sembouès. She was 16 when her father died, and 18 when her mother followed, leaving three orphaned daughters, of whom Marguerite was the eldest. To meet their financial needs, she studied law at the University of Toulouse, graduating with honors in 1902.

== Education ==
The French law of 1 December 1900 allowed women to take the oath of attorney. Dilhan was the third women to take the oath, after Olga Balachowski-Petit and Jeanne Chauvin. During her internship, Marguerite Dilhan was Secretary of the Conference, a role reserved for top performing students. She also received the Ozenne Delourme prize for excellence of law studies.

After obtaining her diploma in law at the University of Toulouse, she was sworn in July 1903, at the age of 27. She went on to become the first woman in France to open her own law firm and to plead before the Cour d'Assises in a criminal case on 26 November 1903, receiving the public compliments of the judge. She continued her career as a lawyer for over fifty years.

Agathe Dyvrande-Thévenin invited her to join the "Groupement amical des Avocates de France", at a time when women did not yet have the right to vote. French women did not get the right to vote until 1944. Marguerite Dilhan was elected its vice-president. This organisation later became the l'Association française des femmes des carrières juridiques.

== Career ==
In 1904, Marguerite Dilhan successfully defended Arria Ly against a charge of shooting and lightly wounding a doctor Ly held responsible for her father's death. Ly was radical feminist who defended women's right to fair labour, the right to vote and self-defense, who later challenged a man to a duel. Dilhan also defended soldiers during the First World War before the war council. Later, in her office on rue Gatien-Arnoult, she was the lawyer for the numerous Spanish refugees in Toulouse from 1939 onwards and for the Retirada.

In coordination with her friend Marthe Condat, she fought for public hygiene and against health problems, including support for milkbank Goutte de lait. In connection with her work as a lawyer, she was secretary of the Société de patronage des libérés par le travail, which helped people released from prison and the École de la paix. She appeared before all jurisdictions, including the War Councils during the First World War, defending the rights of soldiers.

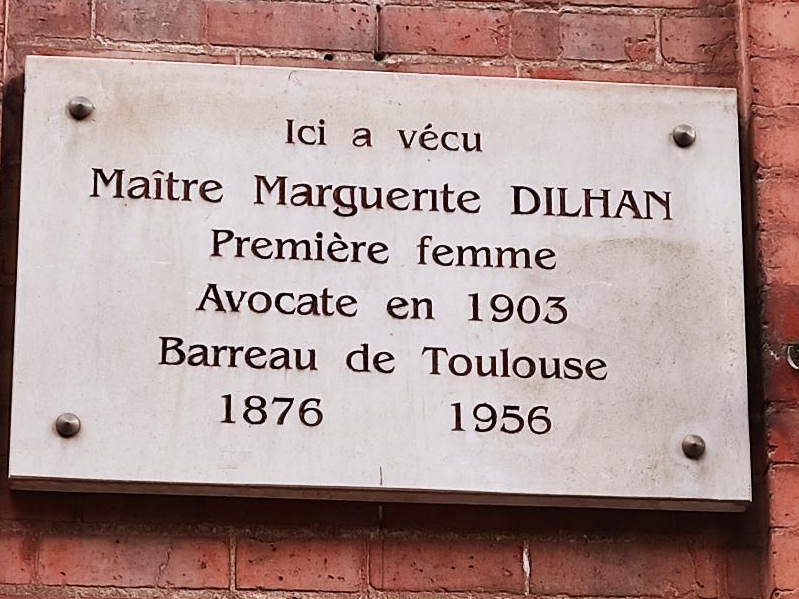
2 bis rue Gatien-Arnoult (Toulouse) where Dilhan lived and worked from 1909 until her death.

== Recognition ==
Marguerite Dilhan received the Chevalier de la Légion d'honneur in 1933 and the Officier de la Légion d'honneur in 1949.

Dilhan died on 3 March 1956 in Toulouse. Her funeral took place on 6 March 1956 in the Basilica of Saint-Sernin in Toulouse, in the presence of many members of the Barreau. The University Toulouse Capitole paid tribute to her pioneering career during the "Month of equlity" in 2025.

The city of Toulouse named a community room and a street after her, while a commemorative plaque adorns her former home and law firm, at 2 bis rue Gatien-Arnoult.

In the Gers:

- the city of Miélan named a street in her honour following a decision of the city council on 29 June 2006.
- the town of Saramon named a street Marguerite Dilhan.

== See also ==
- First women lawyers around the world
- Olga Petit
- Jeanne Chauvin
- Sarmiza Bilcescu
- Agathe Dyvrande-Théveni
- Charlotte Béquignon-Lagarde
