= La Citoyenne =

French feminist newspaper (1881–1891)

La Citoyenne (French pronunciation: [la sitwajɛn], The Citizeness) was a French feminist newspaper published in Paris from 1881 through 1891 by Hubertine Auclert. It was first published on February 13, 1881, and appeared bi-monthly. The newspaper was a forceful and unrelenting advocate for women's enfranchisement, demanding changes to the Napoleonic Code that relegated women to a vastly inferior status. The newspaper demanded that women be given the right to run for public office, claiming that the unfair laws would never have been passed had the views of female legislators been heard. Notable feminists such as Marie Bashkirtseff wrote articles for the paper.

During the newspaper's existence, the League for the Rights of Women was founded by Léon Richer in 1882, and in 1888 Le Conseil International des Femmes (CIF) was organized, creating the first international feminist organisation. In 1891, Hubertine Auclert ran out of money and her newspaper closed. That same year, activist Maria Martin (1839–1910) launched Le Journal des femmes and on December 9, 1897, high-profile actress and journalist Marguerite Durand (1864-1936) continued the cause and opened another feminist newspaper called La Fronde.
