= International Federation of Women in Legal and Juridical Careers =

International Federation of Women in Legal and Juridical Careers (FIFCJ) also called International Federation of Female Lawyers and Judges (French: Fédération internationale des femmes magistrats et avocats) was an international non-governmental organization (NGO), founded in Paris in 1928.

== History and activities ==
According to the organization's history, 60 années d'histoire de la fédération international des femmes des carrières juridiques (Melun: FIFCJ, 1989), the federation was created by Vera Poska-Grünthal (Estonia), Clara Campoamor (Spain), Marcelle Kraemer-Bach (France), Agathe Dyvrande-Thévenin (France), and Margarete Berent (Germany).

The organization was founded to work for the professional rights for women and women's rights and opportunity to study law. It was the first permanent international organization for women lawyers (the very first, the Woman's International Bar Association, was founded in 1888 but short lived).
