= Bibliothèque Marguerite Durand =

Specialized public library in Paris, France

Coordinates: 48.8267°N 2.3663°E

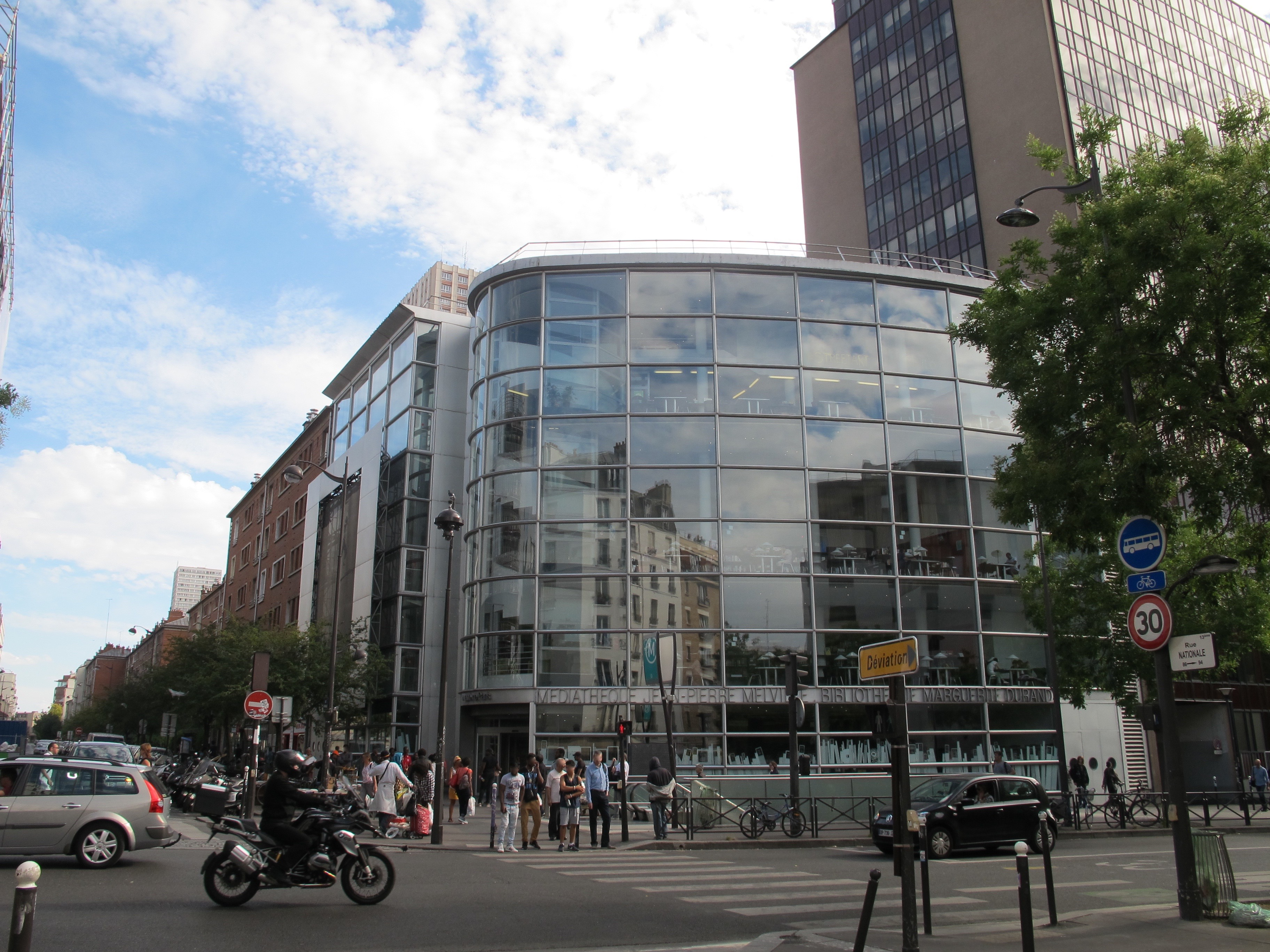
The library in 2017

The Bibliothèque Marguerite Durand is a specialized public library run by the Paris municipal library system.

== History ==
Created from a massive collection started in 1897 by journalist and activist Marguerite Durand. It was initially located at the premises of her newspaper La Fronde the Library opened in 1931 and moved to 79 rue Nationale in Paris. It holds a collection of materials on French feminism and the struggle of French suffragettes for equality. The collection contains biographies, manuscripts, photographs, periodicals, letters, and more than 25,000 books dating back to the 17th century, plus 4,000 pieces of correspondence written by prominent women.

Among the books and papers that can be found in the library are materials from women authors, artists, scientists, explorers, politicians, journalists and other notable women including Madame de Staël, Colette, Marie Bashkirtseff, Séverine, Gyp, Alexandra David-Néel, Maria Deraismes, Clémence Royer, and Olympe de Gouges.
