= Arria Ly =

French journalist (1881–1934)

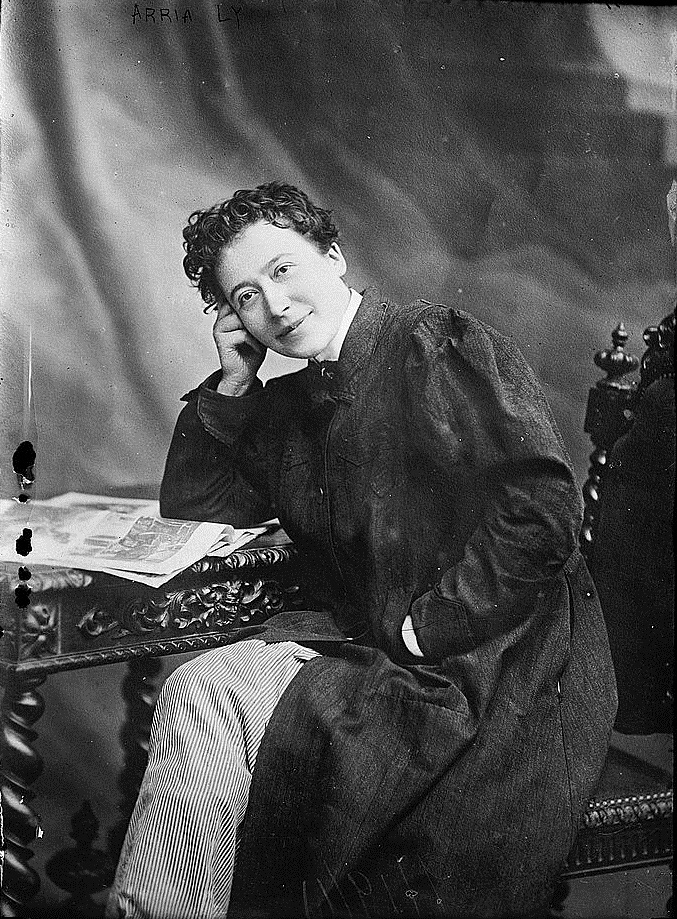
Arria Ly, c. 1900

Arria Ly (real name Joséphine Gondon; March 24, 1881 – December 19, 1934) was a journalist, writer, lecturer and radical French feminist in the early twentieth century. Ly, who was known for her aggressive and impassioned rhetoric style, popularized radical feminist ideas, arguing for perpetual celibacy and putting forth a robust anti-marriage campaign. She gained notoriety nationally in France in the aftermath of the famous 1911 Ly-Massat affair.

Ly's radical ideas about male-female sexual relations set her apart from the mainstream French feminist movement and generated significant controversy among both the public and her feminist peers. Ly's notoriety as a radical alternative to mainstream feminism caused her to gain many nicknames including "Cadette de Gascogne," the "Laic Nun," and the "Pistol Virgin."

== Family life and religious upbringing ==
Ly was born on March 24, 1881 in Cayran, France. She had a sheltered familial upbringing and was educated almost solely by her mother, Fanny Gondon, an ardent Catholic who was educated at a convent boarding school. Although Ly's father was an anticlerical republican who worked as an inventor, he believed a strict Catholic education to be the most appropriate for his daughters. As a result, Ly was only attended a conventional school for two years, with the remainder of her education stemming from her mother and private tutors.

By assuming near sole responsibility for Ly's education, Madame Gondon passed on to her daughter Catholic notions about sexuality and purity. After completing her Catholic education, Fanny Gondon desired to become a nun and requested that her parents allow her to take her vows. However, her mother denied her request and forced her into marrying Monsieur Gondon. In her writings, Madame Gondon's opinions on sexuality, morality and marriage all mirror the radical arguments later put forth by her daughter. Madame Gondon argued that all sexual relations were inherently immoral and that virginity provided the only avenue for a woman to maintain her purity. She specifically blamed men for spoiling the purity of women, pointing to their filthy and dishonorable desires as the source of the immorality. Gondon's writings further convey psychological conflict from her forced marriage to Monsieur Gondon and the subsequent loss of her virginity. In response to her own experience, Madame Gondon maintained high moral expectations for her daughter and hoped for her to be the embodiment of purity.

Further adding to Ly's isolation from mainstream society, her parents insisted on accompanying her in public and refused to take her to a variety of cultural spaces including museums, theaters and the cinema. Additionally, because her parents feared the corruptive influence of other children, Ly was also barred from having friends.

As a result of her secluded Catholic upbringing, Ly was not exposed to the realities of male-female sexual relations until 1903 when she, age twenty-two at the time, read a feminist report on prostitution. In a autobiographical piece titled "The Horrible Revelation!", Ly recalled this discovery as an extraordinarily painful moment of her young life. After reading the report, Ly demanded clarification from her parents. However, in her writing, she pointed to her mother's explanations as a source of further confusion. Ly's experience was a relatively common one for the many young French women who were kept ignorant of sexual acts by their sheltered educations in Catholic boarding schools. However, each of these women interpreted and responded to their revelatory experience in unique ways. For Ly, although she maintained anticlerical and atheist views later in life, the revulsion she experienced as a result of discovering male-female sexual relations was formative in shaping her commitments to both perpetual virginity and anti-marriage views.

Ly's father died later that same year, when Ly was twenty-two years old. Following the death of her father, convinced that an eminent Grenoble doctor was responsible for his death, she slightly wounded him with a firearm, resulting in a high-profile trial. Defended by one of France's first female lawyers, Marguerite Dilhan, she was acquitted on February 28, 1904. Ly and her mother continued living together for thirty-one years. As they moved from place to place, Madame Gondon was supportive of both Ly's participation in the feminist movement and her career pursuits. Faced with the responsibility of providing for both herself and her mother, Ly sought work as a journalist and a teacher.

== Role in the French feminist movement ==
In the early years of her activist career, Ly's vision focused on both reclaiming the term "Mademoiselle" as an esteemed label for unmarried, working women like herself, and supporting the autonomy of young women in pursuing paths other than marriage. In a public lecture given in 1902, Ly spoke directly to the young women entering the professional workforce and charged them with the task of proving that women were capable of filling the professions newly available to them. In this lecture and throughout the remainder of her life, Ly's activism specifically distinguished between the older generation of married women and the younger generation of single females. Ly's opposition to marriage was such that she characterized married women as enslaved women of the household and argued that because of this susceptibility, these women were ultimately detrimental to the younger generation's modern feminist movement. Continuing the message provided in the public lecture she gave in 1902, from 1902 to 1903, Ly published a weekly column in the Réveil du Dauphiné, in which she documented the advancement of middle-class women beyond white-collar positions and into a variety of liberal professions. In her columns, she often highlighted the admission of women to universities for the study of law, medicine and pharmacy, and discussed the emerging potential for women to earn substantial salaries and build independent lives. Over time, Ly's writings and public statements became more divisive and her vision began to focus more narrowly on the importance of perpetual virginity and singleness.

=== Radical contributions ===
==== Anti-marriage campaign ====
Building upon her early characterizations of married women as detrimental to the modern feminist movement, in 1908, Ly published an article titled "The Young Woman's New Year" which encouraged young, single women to confidently resist parental pressure to marry. In similar articles, Ly often included fictional stories about young women who succumbed to external pressure to get married, stemming from their parents and society as a whole. Ly used these types of stories to emphasize marriage as a sudden transition which steals from promising young women their intellectual freedom.

In a later article, published in 1910, Ly adopted a controversial critique of married women referring to them as "femmes à la mer," or "seaside women" who were enslaved to the demands of unpaid housework. In the article, Ly specifically distinguished between the two potential paths women faced, delineating married women as man's inferior and young, unmarried women as the free-spirited and intelligent women of tomorrow.

As part of her emphasis on the need for female autonomy, Ly also specifically portrayed marriage as a method for degrading women's legal status to that of a minor and argued that it was necessary for all women to reject the social and political dependency imposed by marriage. Ly often launched harsh criticism against married women arguing that their marriage is evidence of their failure to resist the temptation of their husbands and the finality of their loss of virtue. At times, she did express sympathy for the women forced into marriages by social and familial pressures, however, in general, her writings tended to draw uncompromising distinctions between the sacred nature of virginity and the sullied nature of married women.

==== Perpetual abstinence ====
In 1902, Ly also began writing and publishing articles arguing for unconditional celibacy as an important part of the feminist movement. Her views on sexual relations differed sharply from those of mainstream feminists. She advocated for women's unconditional celibacy and upheld permanent virginity as the only way for women to liberate themselves from the, according to her, inherent abasement of male-female sexual acts, and to prevent the degradation of their purity.

In 1905, she published an article titled "Restons Mademoiselle" in La Femme affranchie which encouraged all young French women to remain virgins for life. Other feminists responded to this article and others of a similar nature by arguing that Ly's notion of virginity was foolish and naïve and unfairly asked women to effectively detach themselves from the predominant social and political conditions of the Third Republic.

Six years later, in June of 1911, she published her most controversial and famous article "Vive 'Mademoiselle!'" which built upon previous arguments by tying unconditional celibacy to the need for female autonomy and specifically pinpointing virginity as the highest honor for feminism.

Ly's article "Vive 'Mademoiselle!'" was inspired by debates, popular in the fall of 1910, surrounding whether the term "Madame" should be used to refer to both single and married women, rather than continuing to distinguish between the two. Looking to mitigate continued stigmatization of unmarried women, the majority of the public favored applying the term "Madame" to all women. Ly, however, rejected the use of "Madame," arguing that the term implied the permanency of women's psycho-sexual subordination to men and their dependent status in marriage. Ly preferred to reclaim the term "Mademoiselle" as a symbol of the unique autonomy of unmarried, working women in twentieth century France. Ly used this term to encompass the need for single women to retain their independence and purity by refraining from both marriage and all sexual relations with men. However, because her argument was highly antagonistic toward married women, characterizing wives as besmirched women, akin to prostitutes, she received heavy criticism for her article.

From 1904 to 1911, Ly also engaged in frequent communication with other prominent French feminists to discuss questions surrounding sexual ideals and practices. Ly used this feedback to continually revise and polish her doctrine, up until publication of "Vive 'Mademoiselle!'". During this time, Ly came to understand that her ideas separated her from mainstream feminists and, in the article, she specifically acknowledged her failure to rally other French women around the promise of unconditional celibacy.

In 1913, Ly founded her own, albeit short-lived, newspaper, Le Combat féministe, organe du mouvement féministe arrilyst, in which she reinforced the ideas voiced in "Vive 'Mademoiselle!'" and declared war on male-female sexual intercourse. In the very first issue, published in 1913, Ly spoke to women's capacity as militants.

=== Religious influence ===
Although Ly publicly identified as an atheist, the enduring influence of her ultra-Catholic upbringing and her jarring discovery of male-female sexual relations was evident in her treatment of other French feminists and many of her writings. Ly was often publicly antagonistic toward fellow French feminists who she deemed to be sexually immoral. For example, she coined the term "femellistes" to categorize and publicly shame feminists who she believed to be using sexual allure to garner support for their cause. And, in her disagreements with other French feminists, Ly often focused her arguments on charges of sexual impropriety rather than specific political differences.

Furthermore, in 1911, Ly requested that the women in her feminist group, Le Combat féministe, fill out a survey about their own personal sexual activities to ensure that they were adhering to her model of appropriate sexual behavior. Acting against the advice of her colleague, Anne Léal, Ly alienated her fellow feminists who were primarily concerned with achieving voting rights and disagreed with her strict ideas of female purity.

Many of her readers perceived the influence of Catholicism in her writings and ideas, characterizing her opinions on marriage and sexuality as the product of intense psychological tensions. One critic suggested that her writings were likely influenced by a traumatic personal experience and could potentially be a disguised retelling of her own experience with sexual abuse. However, Ly, who was twenty-nine at the time, rejected this notion and proudly stated her continued commitment to perpetual virginity. Taking a similar, but less personal perspective, one journalist argued that Ly's hard-line rejection of sexual relations was not nearly as subversive as it appeared to be when understood within the framework of Catholicism. The journalist understood her views on celibacy to be a reaction to the cruelty of Catholic education and the tortuous notions of female purity that were passed along to young Catholic women. Other members of the French public similarly linked Ly's disdain for sexual relations to Catholicism and argued that although many of her ideas were too extreme to be widely palatable, many women resonated with her underlying message due to comparable Catholic upbringings.

=== Reactions in the context of early twentieth century France ===
==== The population problem ====
Concerns about the population problem in the early twentieth century France were influential in shaping the French feminist movement and the public's response to Ly's urge for lifelong celibacy. Feminism came to be deeply intertwined with depopulation concerns and the growth of French nationalism during the Third Republic, with all three issues playing an instrumental role in bringing the woman question to the forefront of French political discourse. From 1850 to 1910, France's population growth fell far behind that of neighboring powers, namely Germany and Great Britain. During this period, the French population increased from 35.7 to 39.1 million, compared to Germany's increase from 33.4 to 58.4 million. France's loss in the Franco-Prussian War of 1870 and the subsequent annexation of Alsace-Lorraine underscored for the country the dangers of the population crisis and the associated decline in national military strength.

Immediately following the Franco-Prussian War, French women were targeted as the source of the population problem, accused of avoiding pregnancy and failing to properly care for infants. As a result, French feminists in the late nineteenth and early twentieth centuries were sensitive to the role of the population crisis in shaping public responses to their cause. The positions of mainstream feminists on sex and reproduction reflected their high level of concern for addressing the population problem and providing for France's future. Mainstream feminists focused their arguments on the importance of mutual fidelity in marriages. They argued that married men should have to restrain their sexual impulses in the same way that married women are expected to, rather than satisfying their desires by regularly engaging in sexual activity with prostitutes.

Depopulation concerns caused many members of the public to interpret Ly's anti-marriage campaign and her push for perpetual virginity as being potentially treasonous. Additionally, the perceived threat of Ly's arguments was amplified further by broader anxieties about the feminist movement and the potential decline of the motherhood model. Even among other radical feminists, such as Madeleine Pelletier, her arguments were frequently labelled as unreasonable in the context of France's population crisis.

==== The cult of femininity ====
Ly's campaigns against male-female sexual relations and marriage can further be understood as a radical response to the ideas perpetuated by the cult of womanhood, popular in France in the 1870s. Grounded in public perceptions of France's need to compete socially and economically with other industrialized countries, the cult emphasized women's responsibility to devote all of their energies to the task of creating and raising France's next generation. Rejecting the demands of the cult of femininity, Ly put forth permanent virginity and singleness as avenues through which to provide sexual and political autonomy for women.

==== The equality versus difference debate ====
Throughout the early twentieth century, the French feminist movement was marked by an ongoing divide between feminists who upheld a femininity-centered approach to activism and those who did not. Commonly referred to as the equality versus difference debate, French women were concerned by the question of whether femininity and womanhood could be preserved, or if calls for equality necessarily demanded that women become more similar to men. Most mainstream feminists sought to counteract criticism that feminism represented an abandonment of womanhood, arguing that the pursuit of equality did not require women to adopt masculine characteristics.

The influence of this debate was notable in the correspondences between Arria Ly and her close friend and fellow radical feminist and journalist, Madeline Pelletier. Pelletier, the director of La Suffragiste, a militant feminist newspaper, and Ly were frequently distinguished from the mainstream French feminists of the early twentieth century and recognized for their more radical views. The two women regularly sent letters to one another, sharing ideas and providing advice. However, Pelletier and Ly maintained different positions on the equality versus difference debate. Pelletier was recognized for her controversial rejection of femininity, encouraging women to adopt male characteristics and behaviors in order to achieve equality. Ly, on the other hand, preferred a femininity-centered approach and often spoke to the inherent value and unique merits of femininity.

In 1908, for example, Ly wrote an open letter to Pelletier in which she offered praise for La Suffragiste and simultaneously critiqued Pelletier's use of masculine professional titles including "Docteur" and "Rédacteur." For Ly, the adoption of masculine titles would serve to place young professional women squarely in the shadow of male professionals. Ly argued that using feminine versions of the traditionally masculine titles was a necessary step for appropriately acknowledging the inherent value of these young women, separate from the influence of men. Ly, therefore, encouraged Pelletier to abandon use of "Docteur" and "Rédacteur" and instead adopt "Doctoresse" and "Rédactrice" in order to avoid the sexist connotations suggested by the masculine titles.

Years later, in 1933, Pelletier published a book, La Femme vierge, in which she argued for women to abandon all of their conventional feminine characteristics and instead adopt male behaviors, tendencies and societal norms as their own. In a letter to Pelletier, Ly expressed her opposition to this position. In line with the femininity-centered approach, Ly argued that femininity has inherent value separate from the male and posited that for women to adopt masculine characteristics is to admit that the male is superior to the female.

=== Involvement in politics ===
Arria Ly was one of eight women who declared their candidacy for legislative office in the elections held in the spring of 1910. Ly who was running in Toulouse was accompanied by women such as Madeleine Pelletier, running in Paris, and Elisabeth Renaud, running for the l'Isère seat. Leaders of the Union Française pour le Suffrage des Femmes (UFSF), Jeanne Schmahl and Marguerite Durand, were also running in the elections. The UFSF, an organization closely affiliated with the International Woman Suffrage Alliance, was founded by Schmahl in 1909 to fight for women's right to vote in municipal and regional elections.

Their decision to run was, however, criticized by other feminists. At a public meeting in March of 1910, which brought together five pro-suffrage organizations, one of the speakers, Hubertine Auclert, argued that the actions of Ly and the other women running for office, especially the leaders of the UFSF, were hindering the unification of the feminist movement.

==== Treatment of lesbian women ====
Despite the radical nature of their feminist ideas, Ly and Pelletier were not particularly progressive in their attitudes toward lesbian women. Ly and other radical feminists were concerned that being associated with lesbians would weaken acceptance of their own ideas given the public disdain for lesbianism. As a result, they avoided all association with lesbians and characterized them as the enemies of heterosexual women.

== The 1911 Ly-Massat affair ==
=== Context ===
After the initial 1911 publication of Ly's controversial article, "Vive 'Mademoiselle!'", the article was later reprinted in a weekly radical-socialist newspaper, Le Rappel de Toulouse. Her article was published alongside a letter written by journalist Louis Casalé which suggested that Ly's arguments for unconditional celibacy served as evidence of her lesbianism. Casalé's writing, originally published in the Toulouse Reporter, another radical-socialist newspaper, attributed the extreme nature of Ly's call for celibacy to her own corrupted personality. Casalé argued that Ly harbored a hatred for men because they were never interested in her and, in turn, became a lesbian. In response, Ly accused Prudent Massat, the editor-in-chief of the Le Rappel de Toulouse, of violating her honor by reprinting Casalé's letter. She took the incident as an opportunity to reject the male-centric belle époque code of honor, and challenged Massat to a debate.

=== Rebellion against the androcentric belle époque code of honor ===
In the 19th and early twentieth centuries, the male-centric code of honor and the ideas put forth by the middle-class feminist movement were at odds with one another. Women were excluded from the code of honor and associated practices, such as the duel, due to general acceptance of physiological differences between men and women. Perpetuation of these notions relied upon public perceptions of the male physique and men's capacity for physical violence. Because the code of honor barred women from physically defending their own honor, the responsibility fell to male family members. Concerns surrounding a woman's honor were almost always tied only to her sexual virtue.

Ly actively opposed the popular characterizations of women as fragile beings, incapable of forming their own opinions and defending themselves. She understood the need to divert attention away from the female body and therefore focused her portrayal of femininity on personal autonomy and free agency rather than biological functions. In her stance on virginity, for example, Ly emphasized that engaging in sexual relations with men barred women from achieving psychological independence, allowing for a woman's sexual reputation to determine her honor.

In the Ly-Massat affair, Ly's actions demonstrated the potential for women to successfully violate the belle époque honor code and defend their public honor. After Ly accused Massat of attacking her honor and publicly challenged him to a duel, Massat suggested that Ly enlist a man to step in for her on the dueling field. Ly responded to this suggestion by flipping the honor code's notions of masculinity on Massat, arguing that he did not possess the bravery to settle their dispute on the dueling field. In a statement published in a democratic Toulousian newspaper, she suggested that because Massat understood her to be a formidable opponent, he was too scared to face her directly.

In response to Ly's public criticism, Massat continued to refuse her challenge and instead organized a public rally to oppose her antimarriage stance. Ly responded by showing up at the Toulousain meeting hall to confront Massat directly. In front of the more than one thousand people in attendance at the meeting, Ly slapped Massat twice across the face. In the line with the code of honor of the belle époque period, the Ly's premeditated aggression was intended to force Massat's hand in accepting her duel. News of her aggressive public actions reached audiences far beyond the Southern Region of France, receiving coverage from both Parisian and Midi newspapers. And, although Massat still did not entertain Ly's request for a duel, her aggressive public actions demanded a response. Massat chose to respond with a public letter apologizing for the publication of Casalé's letter in his newspaper, Le Rappel de Toulouse.

== Public perception ==
=== Responses to the Ly-Massat affair ===
Arria Ly's rejection of the belle époque code of honor in the Ly-Massat affair sparked broader debates about the gendered nature of the honor code. Her actions inspired efforts to reshape concepts of female honor, no longer allowing a woman's honor to be rooted only in motherhood and sexual virtue. Instead, many French women hoped to put forth a gender-neutral code of honor.

At the summer of 1911 Toulousian town hall meeting, during which Ly directly confronted Massat, there was significant variety in the audience responses. One attendee, Monsieur Lux, challenged Massat's position arguing that his response to Ly's article should have focused on crafting reasonable counter arguments rather than targeting Ly personally and attacking her sexual virtue. Although Lux directly stated that he did not personally agree with Ly's stances on marriage and abstinence, he expressed support for her efforts to infiltrate the male honor system. His challenges were seconded by women in the audience who demanded to know why Massat thought it appropriate to launch personal attacks against Ly.

The Ly-Massat affair, which established Ly as a celebrity of the French feminist movement, resonated particularly strongly with the many women in early twentieth century France who were working to create opportunities for themselves in traditionally male-dominated professions. Other mainstream feminists upheld Massat's apology as a victory for female writers who were frequently insulted by their male colleagues in the press, and traditionally lacked avenues through which to defend themselves.

==== Responses from the press ====
In the early twentieth century, the French press was primarily concerned with upholding the honor of journalism as a field and repudiating the common twentieth century characterizations of reporters as mudslingers.

In line with these efforts, many French publications responded to the Ly-Massat affair by supporting Ly's defense of her right to journalistic integrity. Agreeing with the statements made by Monsieur Lux, some publications argued that both Massat and Casalé failed to meet the journalistic standards in their responses to Ly by opting for personal attacks rather than engaging directly with the arguments articulated in her article. Some Conservative publications used the affair to comment more generally on the ways in which the gendered nature of the honor code grated against republican values and practices. Other publications focused their attention on Ly's attacks on Massat's masculinity. One republican Parisian newspaper, for example, derided Massat for his antiquated reliance on notions of male bravery in his refusal to confront Ly. Leftist publication, L'excelsior pointed to Ly's courage and supported her right to defend herself in a duel.

== Death ==
Ly died on December 19, 1934. Ly, who was 53 years old at the time, lost her mother in April of 1934. As that loss weighed on her, she informed several close confidants of her intention to kill herself. In preparation, she compiled all of her writings and ensured their preservation in an archive. Ly first attempted to kill herself on October 31, 1934 when she jumped into the freezing cold water of the Baltic Sea carrying her mother's ashes. However, her attempt failed when a passerby pulled her from the water. Ly's second and final attempt came immediately after she was discharged from the hospital. Carrying her mothers ashes, she jumped from a 16-story building in Stockholm and fell to her death.

== Legacy ==
Ly's ideas are unique in their seamless intertwining of concerns related to the self, sex and politics. Although her conceptualization of perpetual virginity and her arguments against marriage were not well received in the context of France's population crisis, her radical stances and aggressive behavior in the Ly-Massat affair distinguished her from mainstream feminists and sparked broader debates which highlighted fears surrounding the growth of a population of unwed middle-class women in the France. Ly's ideas continued to echo through later waves of radical feminism, influencing activists such as Simone de Beauvoir, Kate Millett, and Catharine MacKinnon.
