= Agathe Dyvrande-Thévenin =

French lawyer

Agathe Dyvrande-Thévenin (2 December 1885 Baugé - 22 December 1977 Fontenay-aux-Roses) was one of the first French female lawyers. She defended women's rights, in particular their access to legal careers and the right to vote. In 1928, she was one of the founders of the International Federation of Women in Legal and Juridical Careers.

She was awarded the knight of the Legion of Honour in 1934.

== Life ==
Agathe Dyvrande was born on December 2, 1885, in Baugé. Her father, Ernest Dyvandre, was a lawyer and then a public prosecutor.

She studied at the Paris Law Faculty, where she obtained a license in July 1907.

She married Henri Thévenin, civil engineer and inspector at the Northern Railway.

Agathe Dyvrande-Thévenin defended women's rights in general as well as their right to vote. She also put forward legal demands for the recognition of unpaid work carried out by women within the home and for international protection of maternity.

In 1926, she became president of the friendly group of women lawyers of France and, in 1928, she participated in the founding of the International Federation of Women in Legal and Juridical Careers (FIFCJ) with Vera Poska-Grünthal, Clara Campoamor, Marcelle Kraemer-Bach (France) and Margarete Berent. The FIFCJ aims to promote women's access to legal careers and studies and to defend women's rights in general through legal channels. Agathe Dyvrande-Thévenin was its first president and her role was praised by her peers for its effectiveness in building solidarity across borders.

Very quickly, in 1929, with Marcelle Kraemer-Bach, Agathe Dyvrande-Thévenin asked the Minister of Justice that women could be judges in juvenile courts in France, based on a case in Poland, a request supported by the deputy Pierre Cathala. Juvenile courts had existed since 1912 and feminists considered that they could be a step towards other functions in the judiciary. However, it was not until 1946 that women were able to access the judiciary.

In 1948, her name was mentioned, along with those of Aimé Borrel, Marie-Thérèse Moreau, Hélène Campinchi and Lucile Tinayre-Grenaudier, as the first woman to sit on the Council of the Bar Association.

In 1947, she was the oldest lawyer, in order of registration with the bar (44 years at the bar).

She died on December 22, 1977, in Fontenay-aux-Roses.
