= Société le suffrage des femmes =

Société le suffrage des femmes also known as Société le droit des femmes or (SFF), was a women's organization in France, founded in 1876.

Its purpose was to work for the introduction of women's suffrage. It was the first organisation in France founded exclusively to work for women's suffrage, founded prior to the Ligue Française pour le Droit des Femmes (1882).

SFF was founded by Hubertine Auclert. It used radical and militant methods and was supported by radical liberals and socialists, but it was a small organisation with little support among the general public.
