= Louis Rémy Sabattier =

French artist

- Born: 23 May 1863; Annonay, Ardèche, France
- Died: 1935 (aged 72); Nice
- Occupations: Painter, illustrator
- Known for: Work in l'Illustration

Louis Rémy Sabattier (French pronunciation: [lwi ʁemi sabatje]; 23 May 1863 – 1935) was a French artist best known for his work for the magazine l'Illustration over a forty-year period.

== Early years ==
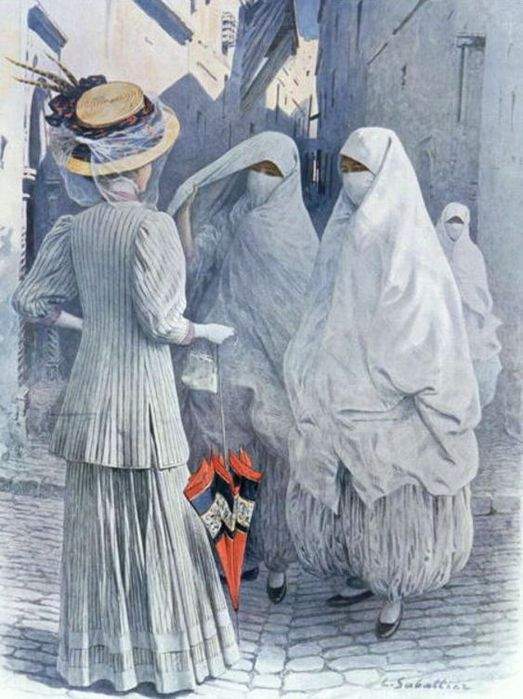
European Woman in Algeria (1910)

Louis Rémy Sabattier was born in Annonay, Ardèche on 23 May 1863. In 1878 he entered the École des Beaux-Arts de Saint-Étienne. He moved to Paris where he entered the studios of Jean-Léon Gérôme (1824–1904) and then Gustave Boulanger (1824–88). He studied under Gustave Boulanger at the Académie Julian in Paris.

== Career ==
Sabattier began work collaborating on creation of large panoramas, notably of Rezonville and of Reichshoffen. He became a member of the Société des Artistes Français in 1890. Sabattier's first drawings of Parisian life appeared in l'Illustration in 1895. For l'Illustration he traveled to Tonkin, Russia, Abyssinia and then Morocco with Hubert Lyautey. In 1912, he completed a long journey in China, visiting Shanghai, Tianjin and Beijing at a time of political upheaval.

Sabattier was modest and gentle, and made many friends. In addition to his dedication to his art, he was an excellent linguist and from childhood had a great love of the sea, making highly esteemed seascapes. Louis Rémy Sabattier died in Nice in 1935, aged 72.

== Work ==
Sabattier's work combined elegance, originality and humor. His obituary noted that "his pencil was not sharp compared to the cruel drawings of Sem, his contemporary." He is known for his depictions of the early days of motoring. He depicted fashions, the foreign official visits of sovereigns and presidents, parliamentary sessions and major trials. He also made highly realistic paintings and watercolors of World War I.

After the war Sabattier made a trip to the Far East, from where he reported amazing stories in text, drawings and paintings. He also illustrated many novels. His wife donated many of his drawings, sketches and paintings to the Museum of his home town of Annonay, to which he had often returned during his life.

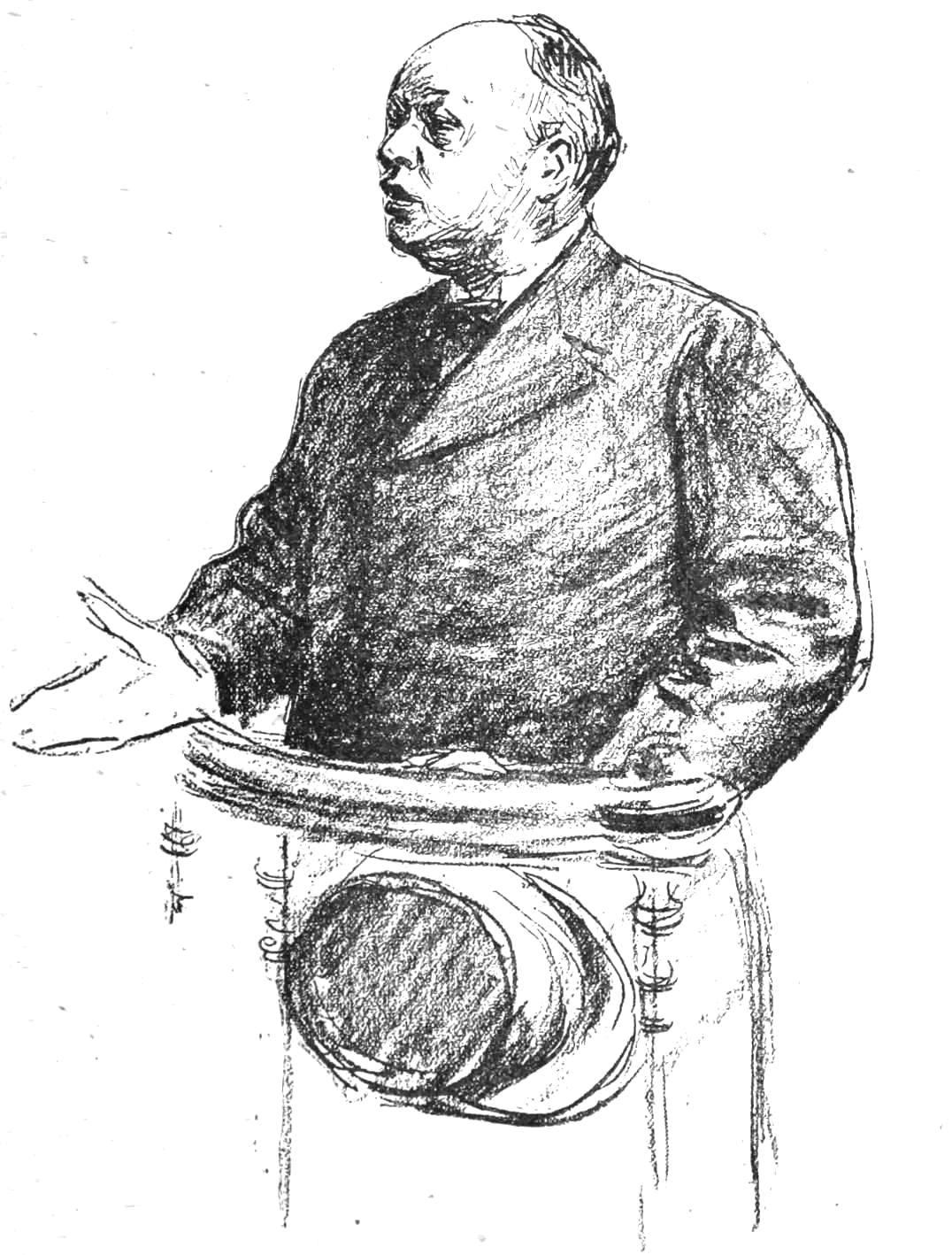
Thévenet (6th session of the Zola trial - 1898)

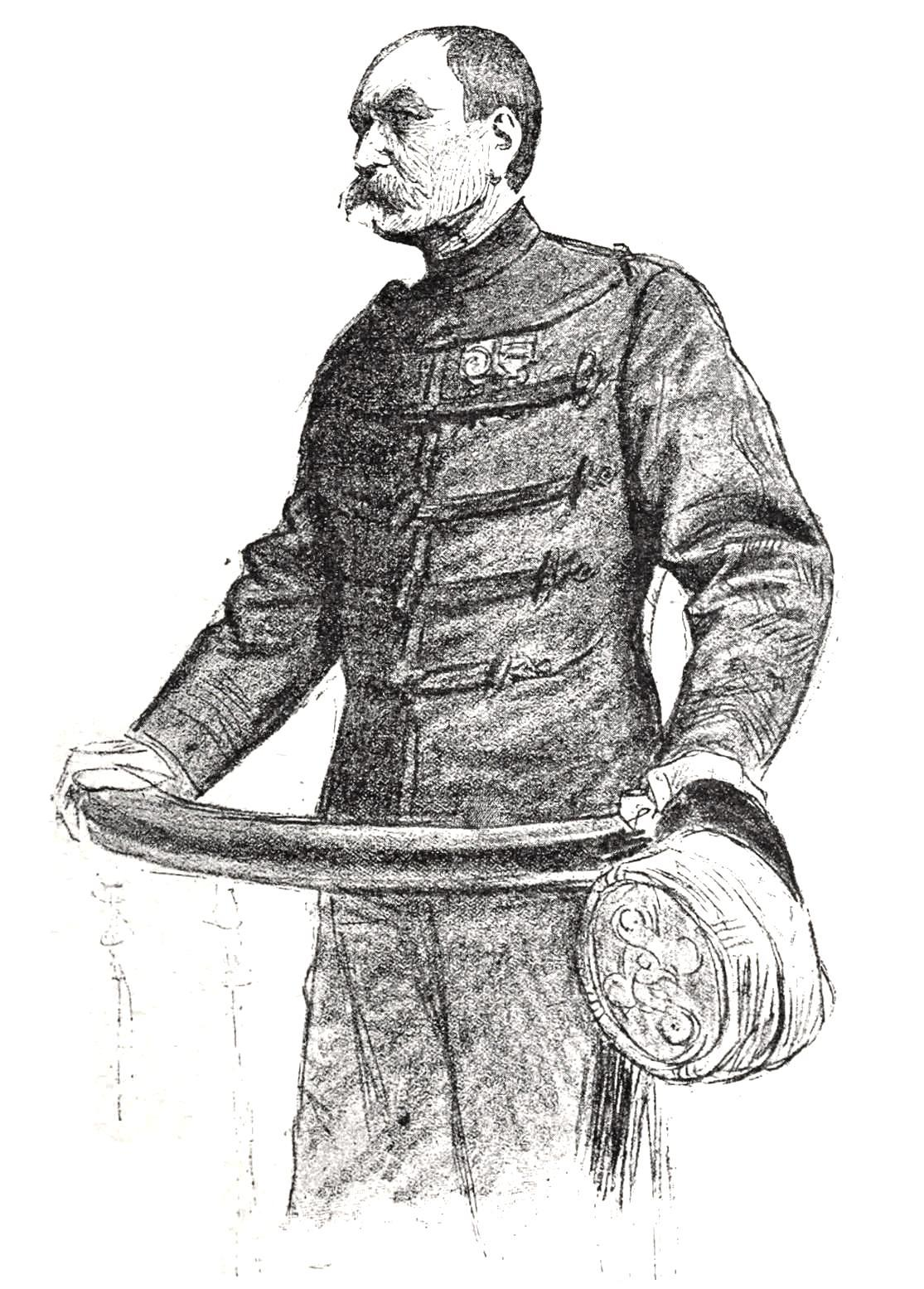
Brigadier General Georges-Gabriel de Pellieux (7th session of the Zola trial - 1898)

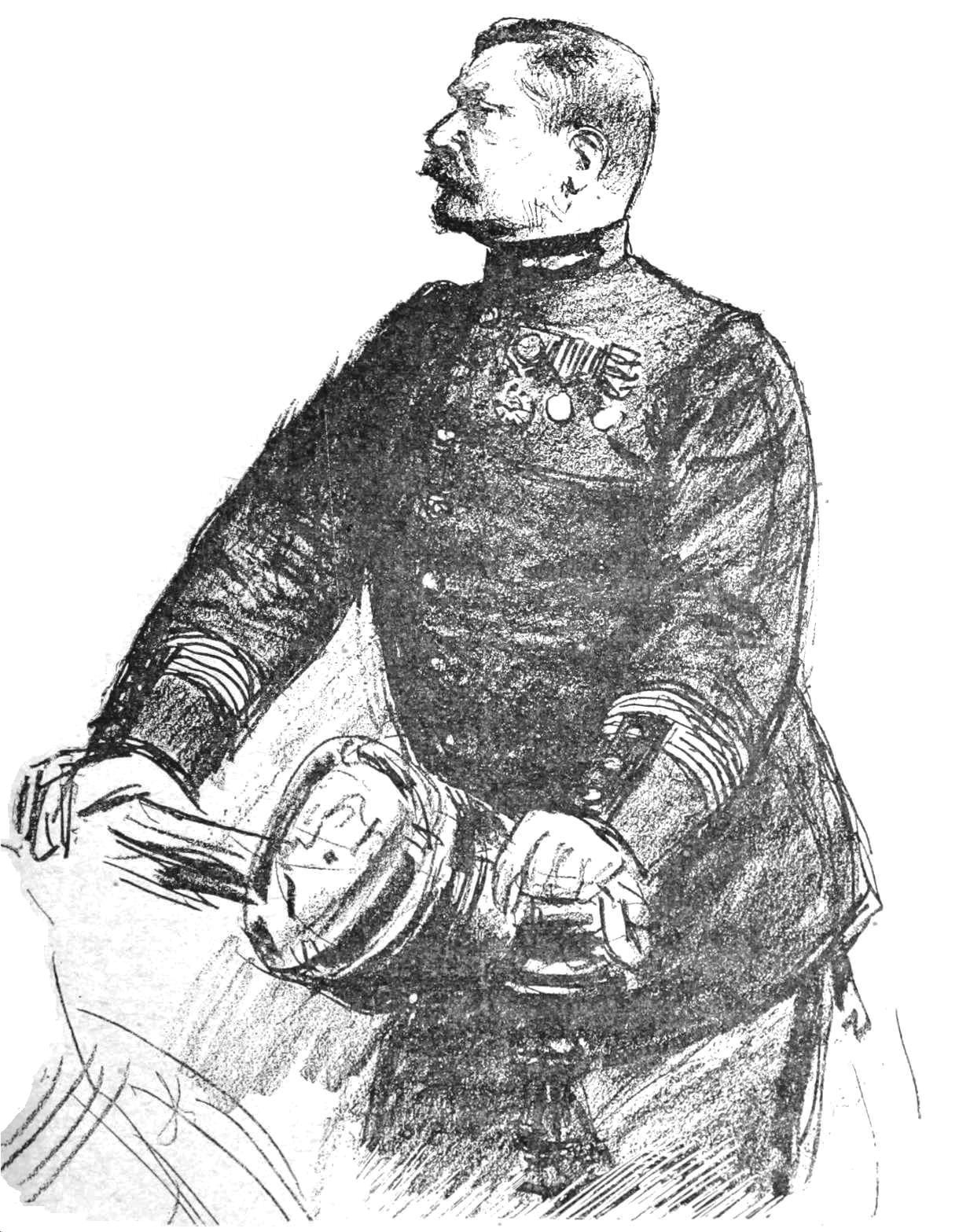
Lieutenant-Colonel Hubert-Joseph Henry (10th session of the Zola trial - 1898)

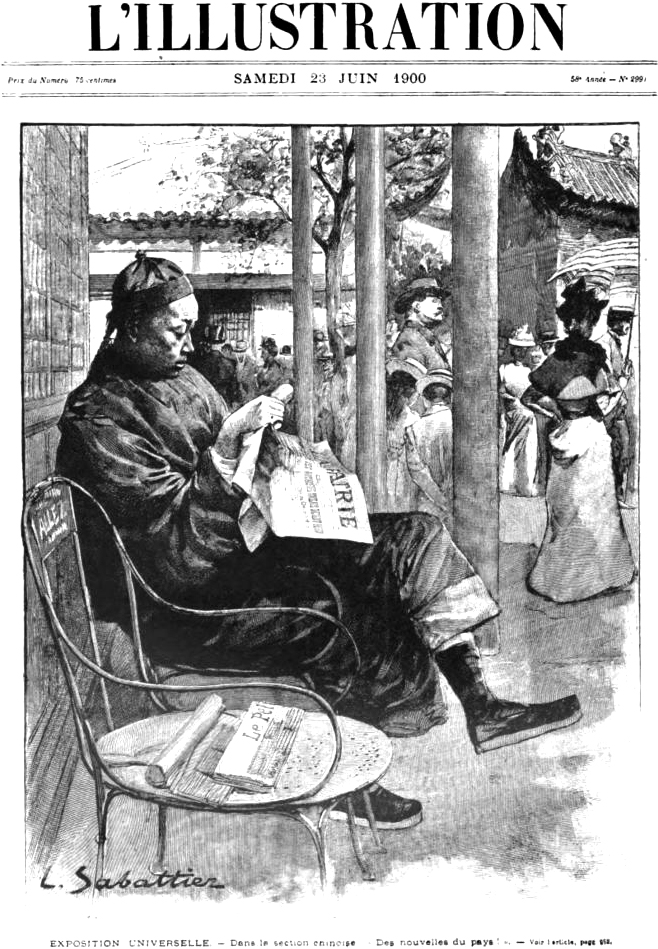
Exposition Universelle - In the Chinese section (1900)

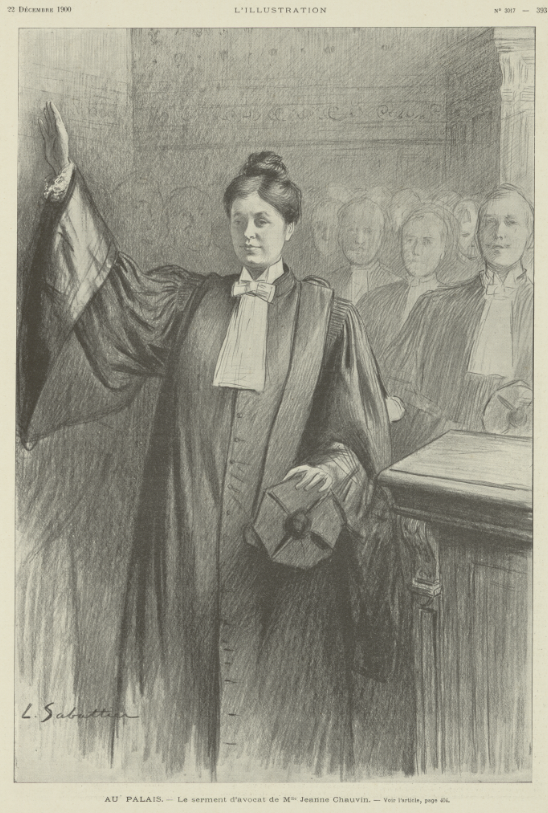
Jeanne Chauvin, the second woman in France to be sworn in as a lawyer (December 1900)

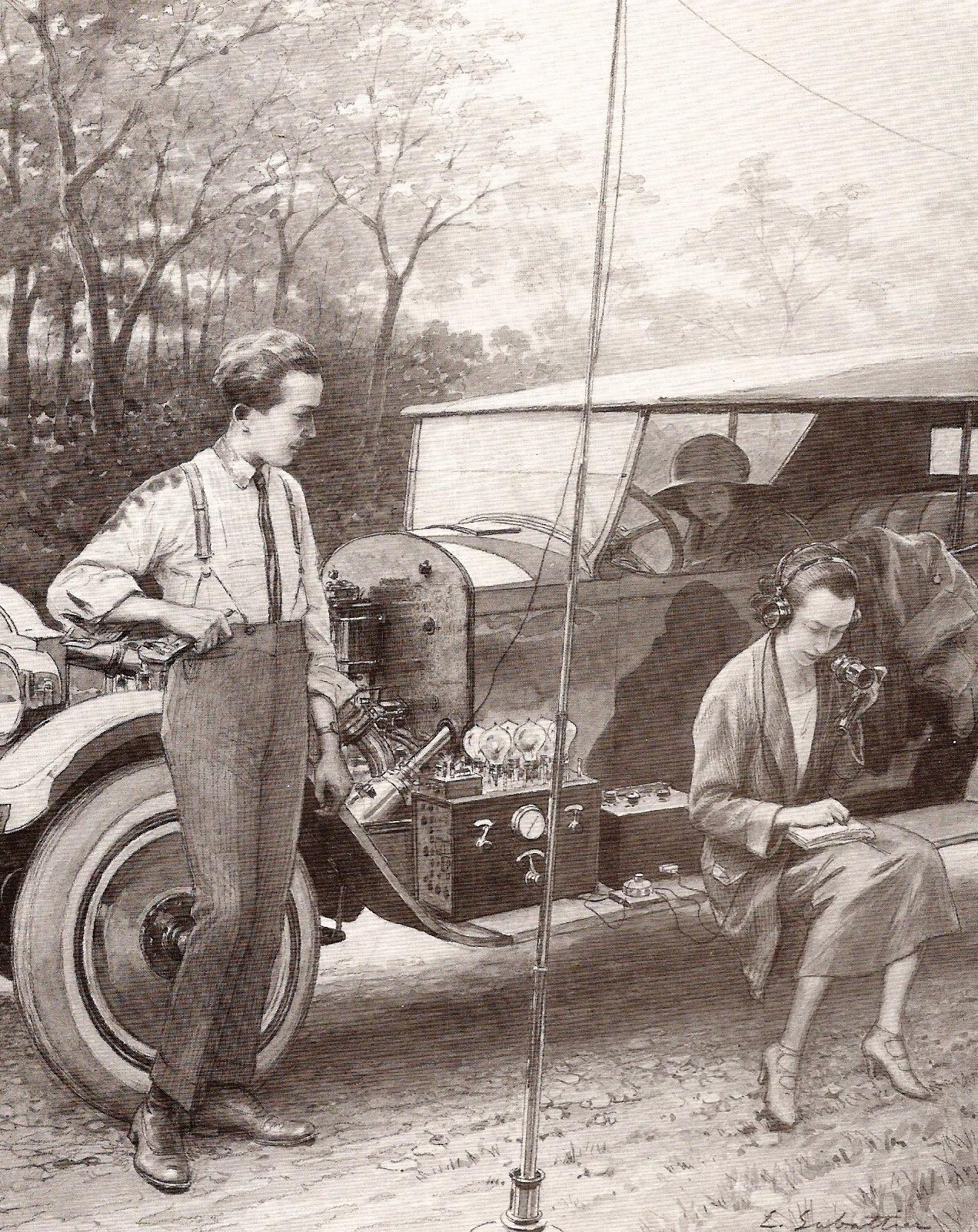
Radio transmitter/receiver to obtain advice from a mechanic in case of failure (1923)
