= Jeanne Chauvin =

French lawyer

- Jeanne Chauvin
- Born: Jeanne Marie Marguerite Chauvin; 22 April 1862; Jargeau, Loiret, France
- Died: 7 September 1926 (aged 64); Provins, Seine-et-Marne, France
- Occupation: Lawyer
- Known for: First to plead at the bar in France

Jeanne Chauvin (22 April 1862 – 7 September 1926) was the second woman to obtain a doctoral degree in law in France in 1890 (after Sarmiza Bilcescu in 1888). Her application to be sworn in as a lawyer was at first rejected, but after the law she wrote was accepted in 1900, she was the second French woman to be authorized to plead at the bar (after Olga Petit.) Certain resources still identify Chauvin as the first female lawyer in France's history because she was the first to plead in court.

== Early years ==
Jeanne Marie Marguerite Chauvin was born in Jargeau, Loiret, on 22 April 1862. Her parents were Jean Cezary Chauvin, a notary, and Marie Émilie Leseur. Chauvin's father died while she was a child, and the family moved to Paris.

Jeanne Chauvin was the second woman to earn a doctoral law degree in France, at the Faculty of Law of Paris, after Sarmiza Bilcescu of Romania. She obtained her PhD in Law in 1890 for a paper entitled "On the legal status of the mother," two years before her French colleague Jeanne Chauvin. She obtained her degree in law on 18 July 1890, and her PhD in law on 2 July 1892 with a thesis titled "Historical Study of the professions open to women, the influence of Semitism on changes in the economic position of women in society". Her scheduled defense of her thesis was disrupted by the protests of male students. When she was later able to present her thesis, she received objections from professors about her assertions on women's rights, and these objections were cheered by hostile students.

Marie Popelin had tried to be admitted to the bar of Belgium in 1888, but had been refused. Since the Belgian and French civil codes were so similar in wording Jeanne Chauvin expected to be refused also. Instead she turned to teaching the law to girls in secondary schools in Paris. Chauvin developed a manual on "Law Courses given in Paris girls schools". She became involved in the Avant-Courrière (Forerunner) association founded in 1893 by Jeanne Schmahl, which called for the right of women to be witnesses in public and private acts, and for the right of married women to take the product of their labor and dispose of it freely.

== Acceptance as a lawyer ==
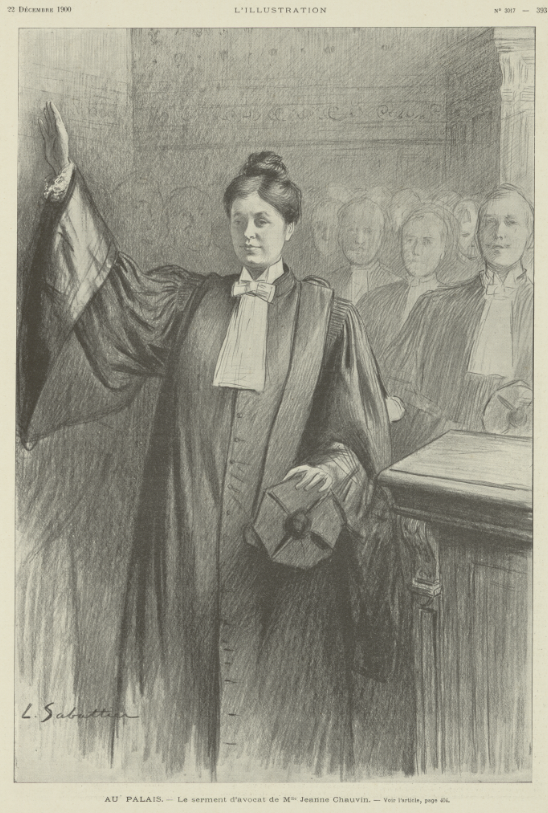
Jeanne Chauvin taking her oath as a lawyer, drawing by Louis Rémy Sabattier from L'Illustration, 22 December 1900

Eventually Chauvin was supported to apply for admission to the bar by Louis Frank, a Belgian barrister and supporter of equal rights for women. On 24 November 1897 Chauvin applied to enroll at the Paris Bar, and presented herself at the Court of Appeal of Paris to take the oath. In a finding dated 30 November 1897 the court, presided over by Samuel Perivier (1828–1902), rejected her application. The court said it was prohibited by law for a woman to take the oath, and the court could only enforce laws but could not change them. The pretext was that according to the bar regulations of 1810 "the profession of avocat was considered to be un office viril." It was also asserted that women could not hold a position in the legal administration since they lacked the necessary civic rights.

Jeanne Chauvin began a campaign to change the law, aided by her younger brother Émile Chauvin (1870–1933), an Associate Professor of the Faculty of Law and a Deputy of Seine-et-Marne (1898–1909). Several arguments were used to make the case for women lawyers. A law of 1848 said all people had the right to work; according to La Fronde there were well over one hundred female lawyers in the United States; and women could make unique contributions. Chauvin said she wanted to act as advocate for poor women and children facing domestic problems, where her "role as defender will seem wholly natural - even to my colleagues.".

The politicians René Viviani and Raymond Poincaré backed her campaign, which was widely discussed in the press. Le Charivari perhaps reflected popular attitudes when it suggested that "in order that ... there is no confusion between female and male lawyers, Le Charivari requests that the latter wear low-necked robes." Later a cartoonist in this paper had a female barrister say "Seeing as you have monopolized the 'robe', sirs, it seems only logical for us to adopt breaches and a morning coat to distinguish ourselves from you."

A law was finally passed on 1 December 1900 by which a woman with a degree in law could become a practicing advocate. However the law made it clear that a woman avocat could never stand in for a judge. On 19 December 1900, thirteen days after Olga Petit [also referred to as Sonia Olga Balachowsky-Petit], Jeanne Chauvin took the oath before the Court of Appeal of Paris, the second woman to enter the legal profession in France. She was followed by Marguerite Dilhan, who took oath in Toulouse on July 13, 1903.

== Later career ==
Chauvin spoke at the Second International Conference of Feminine Organizations and Institutions in June 1900. She and the feminist Marya Chéliga-Loevy favored giving an unmarried mother the right to seek out the father and demand child support. She helped to organize the International Women's Rights congress of September 1900.

On 21 January 1901 Chauvin appeared before the 9th Chamber of the Criminal Court of the Seine. She did not appear in court often, instead dedicating herself to teaching law to secondary school girls. Jeanne Chauvin taught at the lycée Molière in Paris. Her teaching job may have limited her scope to accept cases. However, after a law was passed in 1912 in which unmarried women could pursue the father of their children for support payments, she accepted cases related to this law.

Jeanne Chauvin never married. On 19 January 1926 she was invested as a knight of the Legion of Honour by Raymond Poincaré (1860–1934), a lawyer and former President of the Republic (1913–1920). Jeanne Chauvin died soon after, in Provins, Seine-et-Marne, on 7 September 1926.

== Bibliography ==
- Chauvin, Jeanne (1892). Étude historique sur les professions accessibles aux femmes, influence du sémitisme sur l'évolution de la position économique de la femme dans la société. Paris: A. Giard et E. Brière. pp. 296.
- Chauvin, Jeanne (1895). Cours de droit professé dans les lycées de jeunes filles de Paris. Paris: V. Giard & E. Briére. p. 437.

== See also ==
- First women lawyers around the world
