= Olga Petit =

French lawyer (1870–1966)

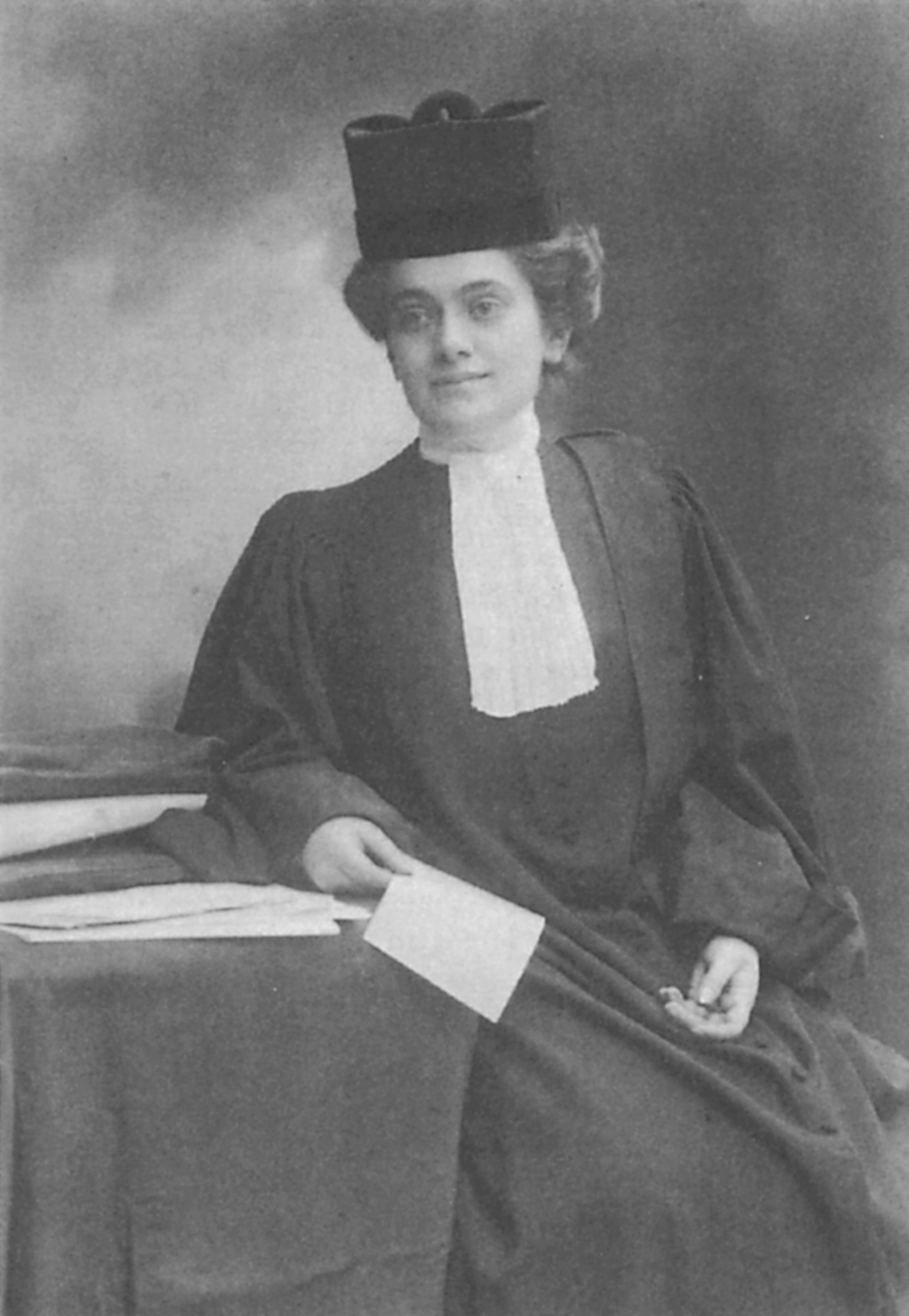
- Born: Scheina Lea Balachowsky; 16 March 1870; Korsun, Russian Empire (now Ukraine)
- Died: 1966 (aged 95–96); Paris, France
- Other names: Sophie Balachowsky-Petit
- Occupation: Lawyer
- Known for: First woman to take the legal oath in France

Olga Petit or Sophie Balachowsky-Petit (16 March 1870 – 1966) was a Russian-born, French lawyer. She is noted as the first woman to take the legal oath in France. She is also known for assisting Russian emigres settling in the country after the Russian Revolution.

== Early life ==
Olga Petit was born Scheina Lea Balachowsky on 16 March 1870, at Korsun (modern-day Korsun-Shevchenkivskiy, Ukraine), a city of the Russian Empire, to Herz and Clara Balachowsky. Her father was an industrialist. She relocated to Paris to study law at the Faculty of Law of Paris from the Sorbonne University. There she stayed with Zinaida Vengerova, She was renamed Sophie in France and was sometimes called Sonia while the name Olga was attached to her full name.

Olga Petit married Jules Virgile Eugène Petit on 28 May 1896. He was also a lawyer and a political journalist. The pair met at a ball organized by the law school where Jules also graduated. An account cited that he was her law school classmate. At this time, she was described as the young Russian from Kiev who introduced him to Russian Socialist Revolutionaries.

== Legal oath ==
On 6 December 1900, Petit took the legal oath and became a qualified lawyer. She was 30 years old. The oath was administered before the First Chamber of the Court of Appeals of Paris presided by Émile Forichon. It was reported that the court was packed with people who wanted to witness the event and Petit was accompanied by her husband. This milestone in French legal history is attributed to the Law n° 1900-1201 promulgated 1 December 1900, which allowed women with the diplomas of licentiate in law to take the legal oath and exercise the profession.

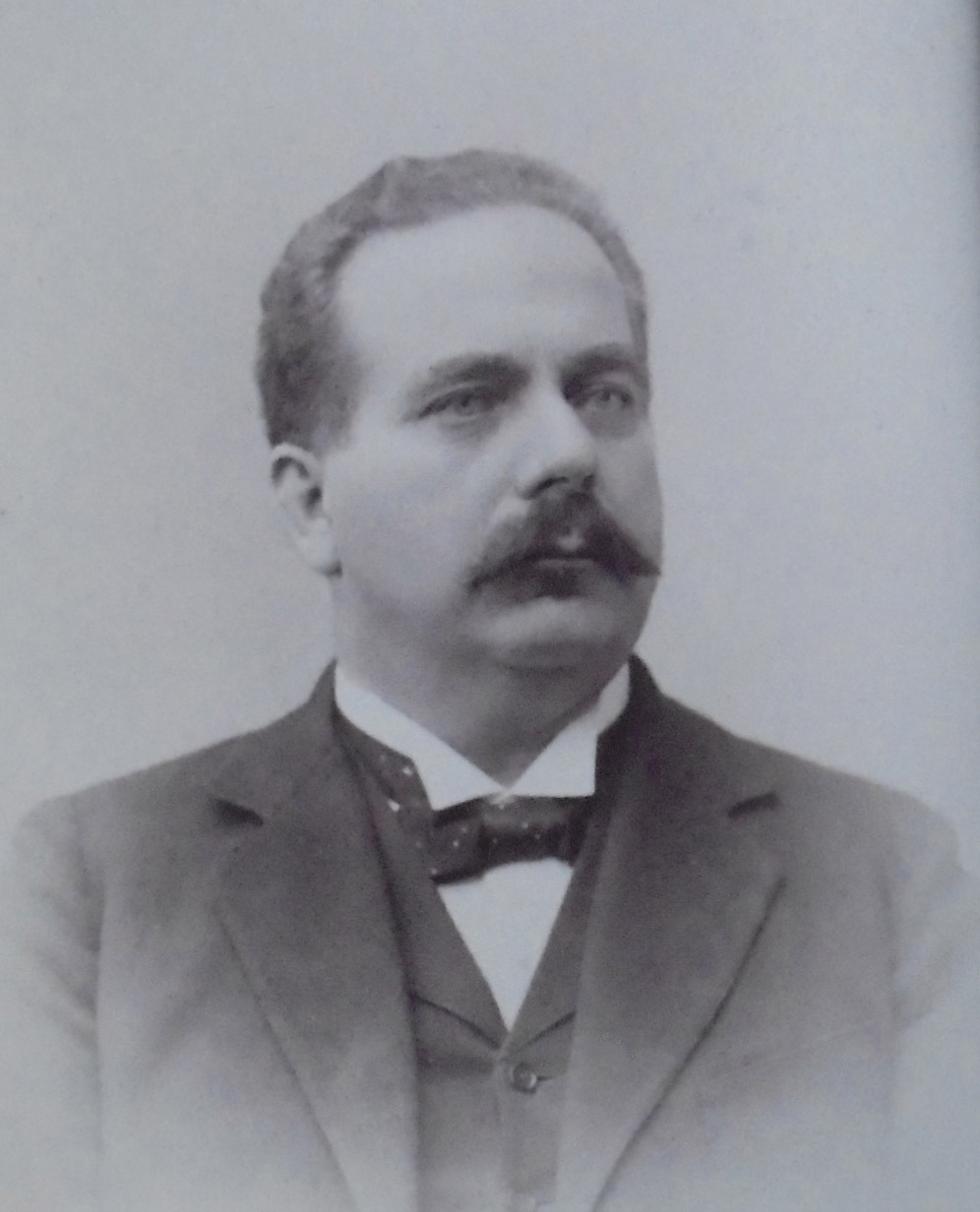
Olga Petit's father Herz Balachowsky was a Ukrainian industrialist.

There was a minor controversy regarding her admission to the Bar. An account cited that she was allowed to take the oath first, preceding Jeanne Chauvin by several days because the latter had actively campaigned for the legislative initiative that sought women to practice law in France. The members of the Paris Council did not want to give Chauvin the honor of being the first woman lawyer in the country. The next woman to take oath was Marguerite Dilhan in Toulouse on July 13, 1903.

Petit died in Paris in 1966.

== Legal activities ==
Petit obtained her law degree with the thesis, Law and ordinance in states which do not know the separation of legislative and executive powers. This work is a historical review and analysis of laws and ordinances in France and England before 1688. While she was the first woman to take the legal oath, she was second to file a legal pleading to Chauvin, who secured this record when she pleaded for a case involving counterfeit corsets. In several of her pleadings, Petit was joined by her husband, who also worked for the Office of the Minister at the Ministry of Trade, Industry, Post and Telecommunications. In these pleadings with her husband, she often took the lead lawyer position.

=== Russian Revolution ===
After the Russian Revolution in 1917, Petit helped Russian emigres relocate to France. Like her husband (who associated with the right wing of the Socialist Party such as Alexandre Millerand and Albert Thomas), she sympathized with the emigres, especially those considered Socialist Revolutionaries. Petit and her husband also played an important role in the cultural rapprochement between France and Russia. Petit helped integrate Russian intellectuals into the French political, literary, and cultural circles. She hosted balls and meetings to introduce them to French society. For instance, she played an important role in establishing the family of Zenaida Gippius and Dimitri Merejkovski in Paris. She also helped the existentialist philosopher Lev Shestov and his family as well as Ivan Bunin, who was the first Russian to be awarded the Nobel Prize for Literature. Shestov was particularly close to Petit. Her brother Daniil was married to the philosopher's sister, Sof'ya Shvartsman.

== See also ==
- First women lawyers around the world
