= Marie Munk =

German-American lawyer (1885–1978)

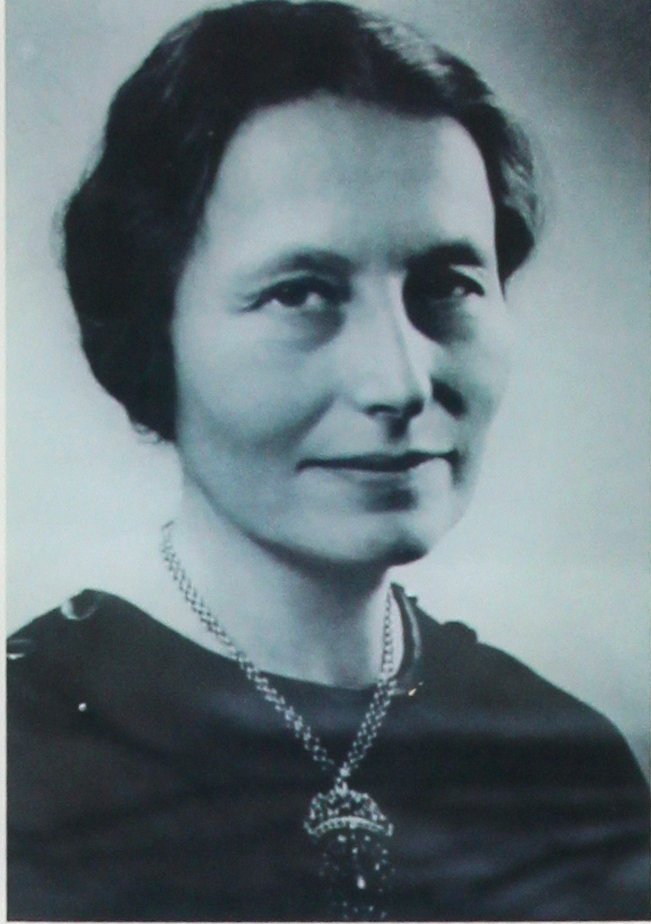
Marie Munk

Marie Munk (July 4, 1885, in Berlin – January 17, 1978, in Cambridge, Massachusetts, United States) was a German-American lawyer. She was the first female judge in Germany. She made efforts to obtain reforms in the family law, concerning equal spousal responsibilities, trouble-free divorce procedures, equal division of property in case of divorce, equal citizenship rights for women.

== Early life and education ==
Marie Munk was born in Berlin (then Prussia) on July 4, 1885. She graduated from Kaiserin Augusta Gymnasium and received her Doctor of Laws degree from Heidelberg University in 1911.

== Life and work ==
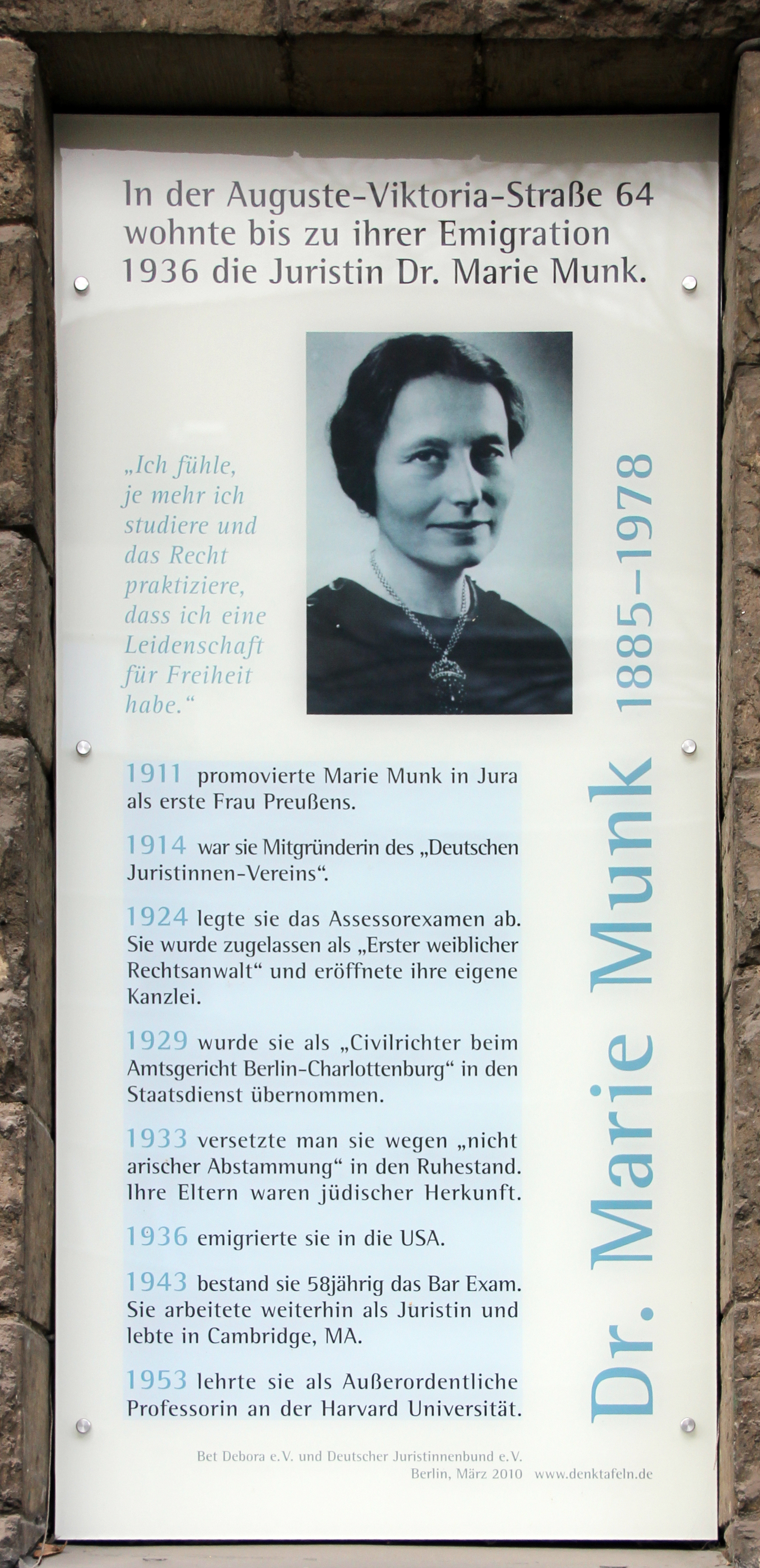
Plaque honoring Marie Munk

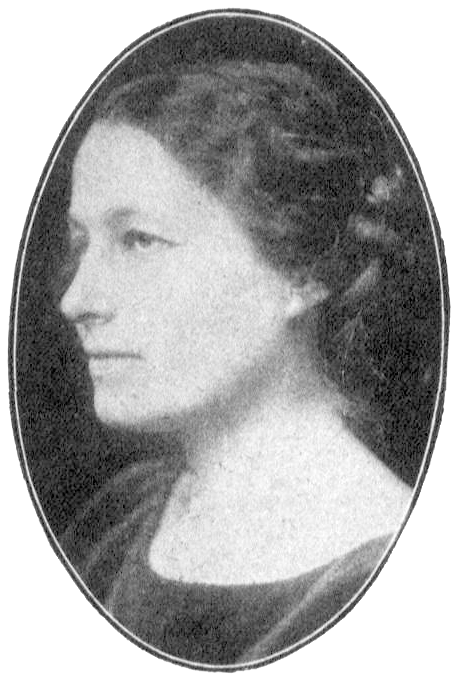
Portrait of Marie Munk

Marie Munk came from a family of lawyers. After attending a high school for girls, she trained as a kindergarten teacher at the Pestalozzi-Fröbel-Haus, and had her first professional experience in Alice Salomon's social work groups for girls and women in Berlin. She prepared for the Abitur and passed the university entrance exam at the Leibniz-Gymnasium in Berlin as an external student. From 1907 Marie Munk studied law, philosophy, psychology and logic in Berlin, Freiburg im Breisgau, Bonn and Heidelberg. In 1911 she earned her doctorate of law Heidelberg with a dissertation on § 123 of the Bürgerliches Gesetzbuch.

Since women were denied access to the administration of justice (judges, lawyers, public prosecutors, administrative lawyers) in the German Empire, Marie Munk began to work as an assistant in a law firm and for a legal advice center for women. During the First World War she worked for the German Red Cross, for the Berlin Social Welfare Office and for the National Women's Service.

After women were also admitted to the legal state exams in the Weimar Republic, Marie Munk completed them and became a consultant at the Prussian Minister of Justice in 1924, but was dismissed again a few months later due to the desolate budgetary situation. In 1924 she was one of the first women in Germany to be admitted to the bar and in 1930 she was appointed a district court councilor and at the same time a district court councilor in Berlin.

In 1914, Marie Munk was a co-founder of the German Women Lawyers Association (predecessor of today's German Women Lawyers Association ), of which she was 2nd Chairwoman from 1919 to 1933. She was also the founder and president of the German Association of Professional Women in Germany from 1931 to 1933 (predecessor of today's Business and Professional Women (BPW) Germany eV ) and a committed member of its international association, the International Federation of Business and Professional Women .

In addition to her proposals on non-marital, divorce and matrimonial law, together with Margarete Berent she developed proposals for the reform of matrimonial property law, which found expression more than thirty years later in the community of accrued gains introduced in Germany and further amendments to the law.

Because she was of Jewish descent, by Nazi law she was dismissed in 1933.

Munk first visited the United States in 1933 at the invitation of the International Federation of Business and Professional Women as a delegate to the International Congress of Women in Chicago. She returned in 1934, having secured a position at the New York School for Delinquent Girls. In 1943 Munk was admitted to the Massachusetts Bar. She went on to work as a marriage counselor for the Court of Common Pleas in Toledo, Ohio.

Munk settled permanently in Cambridge, Massachusetts in 1945.

Marie Munk died in January, 1978.

== Archives ==
The Marie Munk Papers are held in the Sophia Smith Collection at Smith College. The papers were originally bequeathed to the Sophia Smith Collection and the Schlesinger Library. It was determined that the entire collection was more appropriate to the Sophia Smith Collection due to the substantial content on Germany, and the Schlesinger Library transferred their portion of the papers to Smith College in 1979. In her papers, there is documentation of Munk's early career in articles from the U.S. and Germany, and in personal and business correspondence. Although there are some letters from her brother (1914–1915), most correspondence dates from 1934. Of particular interest are letters from musicologist Sophie Drinker (1952–66). There are numerous publications by Munk, as well as manuscripts in both German and English, including material on domestic relations, marriage and marriage counseling, juvenile delinquency, and women's rights. Of special interest are manuscripts on the position of women before and after World War I, written for the International Federation of Business and Professional Women; Munk's reminiscences of her experiences as a judge in pre-Hitler Germany (1945); and a proposal by Munk to reunify East and West Berlin (1948).

Additional resources are available at the Helene Lange Archive in the Berlin State Archive.
