= Leyme =

- Commune
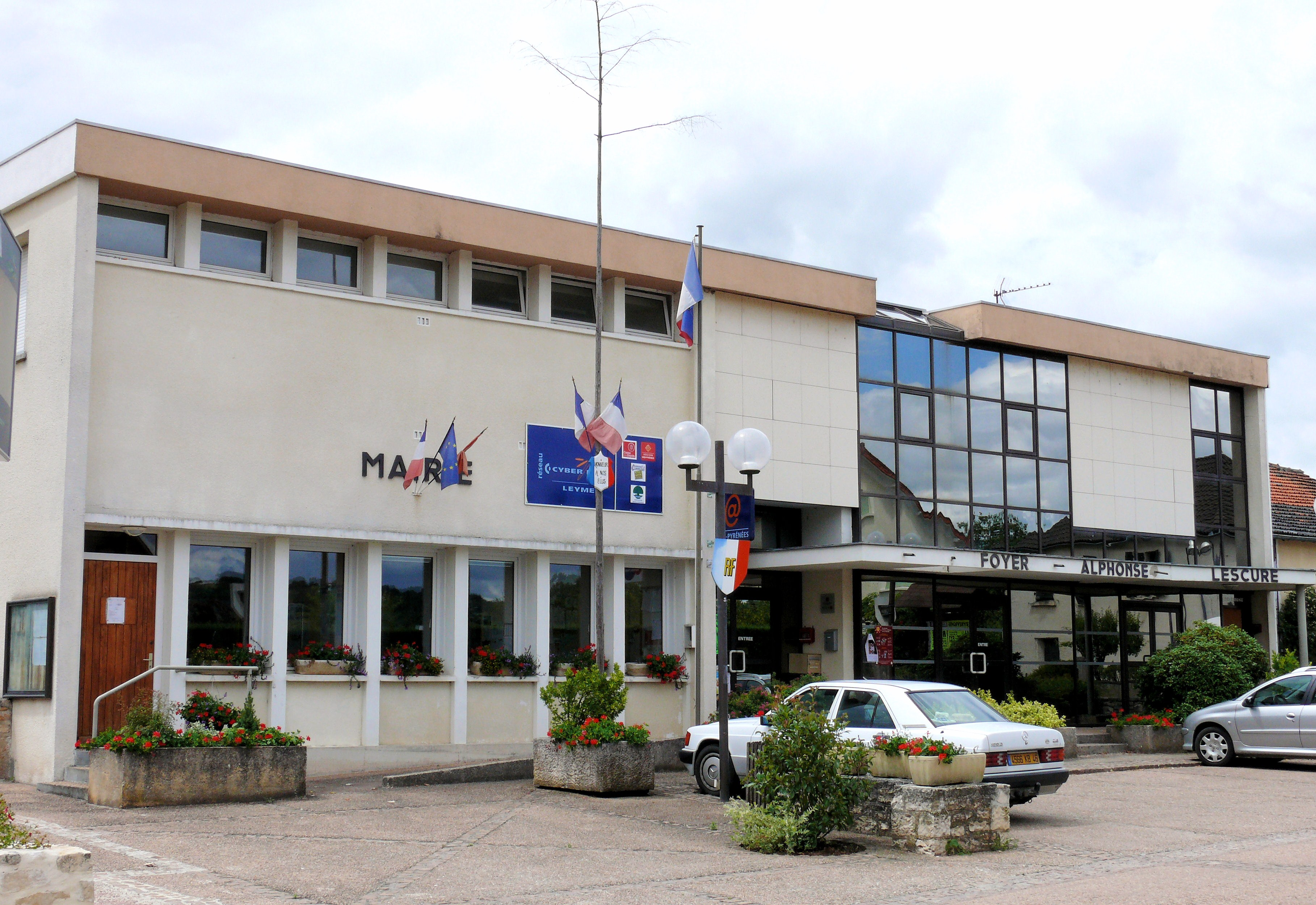
- The town hall in Leyme
- Location of Leyme
- Location within France Location within Occitanie
- Coordinates: 44°47′09″N 1°54′05″E
- Country: France
- Region: Occitania
- Department: Lot
- Arrondissement: Figeac
- Canton: Saint-Céré
- Intercommunality: Grand-Figeac

Government
  - Mayor (2020–2026): Marc Tillet
- Area^{1}: 10.16 km^{2} (3.92 sq mi)
- Elevation: 450 m (1,480 ft)
- Highest elevation: 616 m (2,021 ft)
- Lowest elevation: 407 m (1,335 ft)
- Population (2023): 932
  - Density: 91.7/km^{2} (238/sq mi)
- Time zone: UTC+01:00 (CET)
  - Summer (DST): UTC+02:00 (CEST)
- INSEE/Postal code: 46170 /46120
- ^{1} French Land Register data, which excludes lakes, ponds, glaciers > 1 km^{2} (0.386 sq mi or 247 acres) and river estuaries.

Leyme (French pronunciation: [lɛm]; Occitan: Lèime) is a commune in the Lot department in south-western France.

== See also ==
- Communes of the Lot department
