= Margarete Berent =

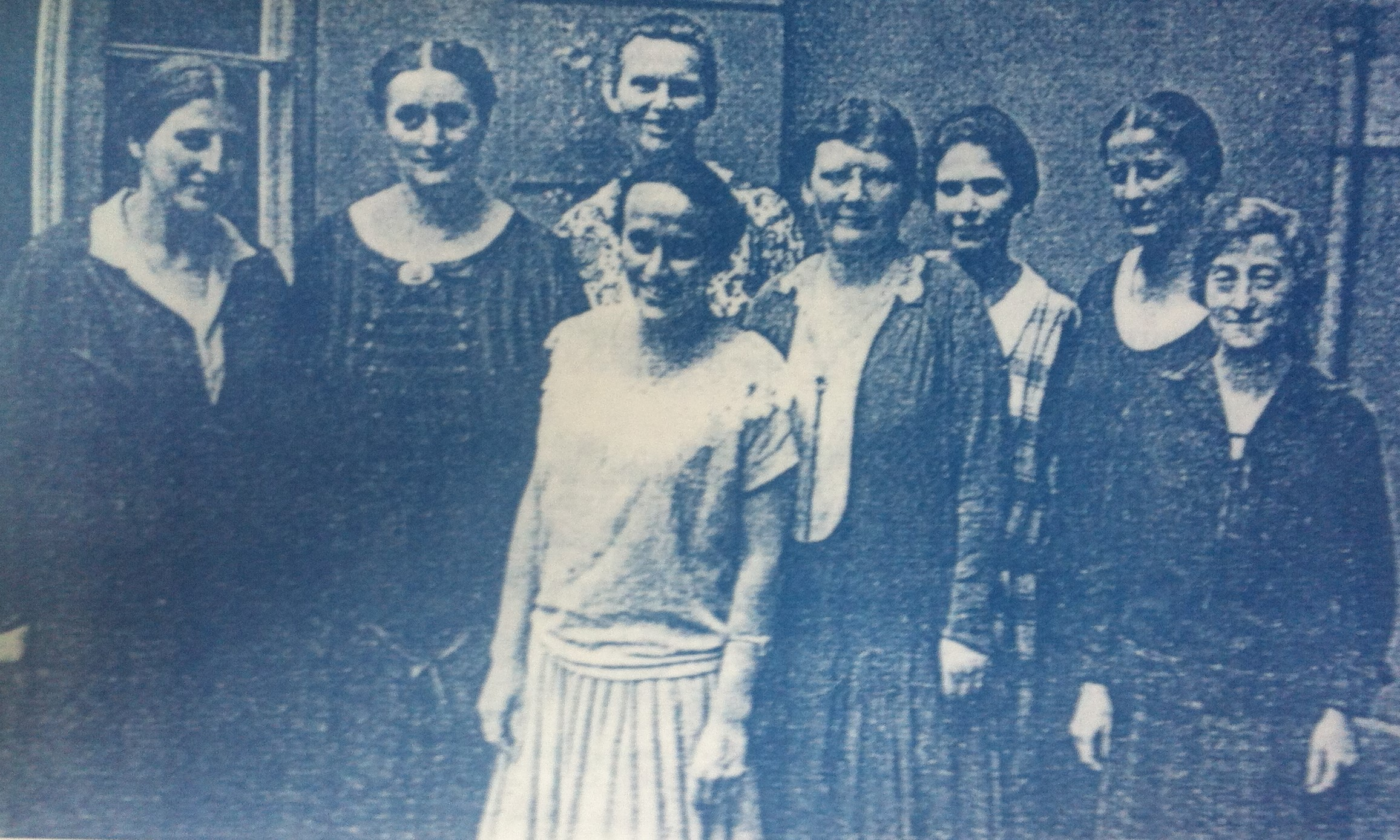
Margarete Berent (on the right) amongst other founders of the Association of German Women Academics, 1926.

Margarete Berent (July 9, 1887, in Berlin – June 23, 1965, in New York), also known as Margareth Berent or Grete Berent in the United States, was the first woman lawyer in Prussia. She was the co-founder of the Association of Women Jurists and Association of German Women Academicians. As a Jew, she suffered from persecution during the Nazi Regime and fled via Switzerland, Italy, and Chile to the United States, where she finally arrived in 1940. After studying American law, she opened her second own law firm, now in the US, in 1951.

== Biography ==
=== Early life and education ===
Margarete Berent was the daughter of Max and Natalie Berent (née Gabriel), a family with bourgeois background. Culture and education were of great value to the family; besides going to school, she had private language and music lessons. After graduating, she studied to be a teacher from 1903 to 1906, one of the few jobs considered suitable for women at that time. Afterwards she started to prepared to take the Abitur enabling her to study at a German university, while working as a teacher at her former school in Berlin at the same time. She visited courses offered by Helene Lange, a contemporary feminist. It was still not common for women to pass the Abitur and studying at universities in Germany in the 1890s.

In October 1910, she passed the exam and was allowed to study law at the University of Berlin. Only about 0.2% of law students were women at her faculty. Although women were admitted to study and obtain a doctorate in Prussia, which Berlin was then part of, they were not allowed to pass the bar and work as lawyers. Hence, Margarete Berent moved to Erlangen in Bavaria in 1912, and finished her studies in 1913 with a study on the "Community of Goods for Married Partners" ("Die Zugewinngemeinschaft der Ehegatten"), which was implemented in the reformation of German inheritance laws in 1958.

=== Career in Germany ===
In order to obtain more practice after her studies, she worked as an assistant in several law offices in Berlin from 1914 on. Furthermore, she worked in advising women about their rights and joined the legal department of AEG. World War I helped her career in the sense that many of her male colleagues were drafted and women could step into new, now free positions. It still took until 1922 until women were admitted to the bar and in 1925, after passing exams now open to women, Margarete Berent became a lawyer. During these years she was involved in legal policy with Marie Munk, in the reform of Marriage Law, Matrimonial Property Law and Family Law in the Weimar Republic. Both belonged to central legal experts in changing discriminatory laws about women in the Feminist Movement. Margarete Berent was especially involved in changing discriminatory laws about women and was an active member of several associations such as the Federation of German Women Associations (Bund Deutscher Frauenvereine), the League of German Female Lawyers (Deutscher Juristinnenbund), and in the International Organization of Women Lawyers. She belonged to the League of German Academic Women (Deutscher Akademikerinnen-Bund) and a professional club for women, the Soroptimist Club. She founded her own law firm as the first female lawyer in Berlin in 1925. Although there were also doubts and discrimination against women in law, her firm became a success quite quickly.

=== Years under the Nazi regime ===
On the 7 April 1933, the Nazi government released a new law that prohibited Jewish lawyers to work as such (Gesetz über die Zulassung zur Rechtsanwaltschaft). Although having engaged in voluntary work and for benevolent causes already before, Margarete Berent now had to shift her professional activities a lot since she lost her law firm. Before 1933, she had mostly engaged in feminist, secular organizations - with the beginning of Nazi Gleichschaltung politics in 1933, many of those started to dissolve in order to avoid being controlled. With her keen interest in women's rights and legal expertise, she was of great importance for Jewish organizations. So in the summer 1933, she first started to work for the Central Committee for Jewish Economic Aid (Zentralstelle für jüdische Wirtschaftshilfe) in Berlin and later, in October 1933, she became the head of the Jewish Welfare association in the Rhine Province. Until 1938, she worked both in Cologne and in Berlin. She was especially responsible for coordination of assistance to small Jewish communities. In 1939, when the new Reich Association of Jews in Germany was founded as a means of controlling and discriminating against Jews (and those defined as such by the Nazi government), Margarete Berent became the head of the Rhine region in this new association, too.

=== Flight from Germany and new beginnings in the US ===
In 1939, when persecution of Jewish citizens became worse in Nazi Germany, Margarete Berent decided to flee. But her application for a visa to the U.S. was not granted. After receiving an interim visa for Chile, she left Germany via Switzerland and Italy. After her arrival in Chile, she had to wait for four months until she was admitted to travel to New York in 1940. Her start in New York City was quite hard for the now 53-year-old. She was not permitted to work as a lawyer, and had to earn a living in low-paying jobs, such as housekeeping. Until 1949, she worked during the day and studied law at the New York University in the evening. Finally in 1949, she finished her studies and was admitted to the bar. She opened her own law firm and worked for several years at the New York Legal Department. She still advised other emigrants voluntarily for years. It was only for a ten-day visit to Berlin in 1959 that she came back to Germany. The fact that her brother Hans and his family died during the Shoah is cited as a reason. Until a short, severe illness that finally led to her death at the age of 78, she went on working as a lawyer. She was a member of Congregation Habonim.
