= Marguerite Durand =

French journalist and feminist (1864–1936)

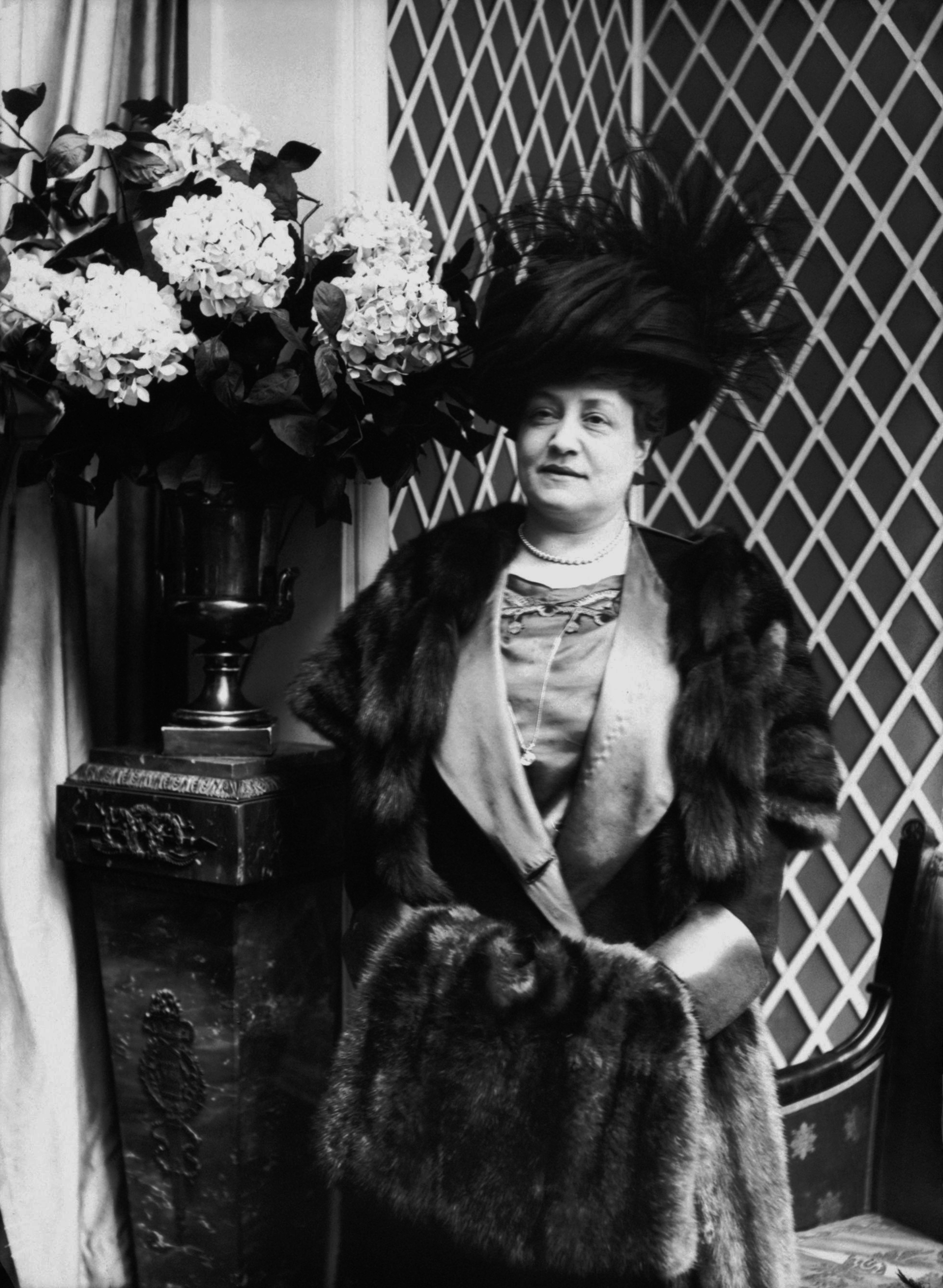
- Durand in 1910
- Born: 24 January 1864; Paris, French Empire
- Died: 16 March 1936 (aged 72); Paris, France
- Known for: leading feminist, newspaper and library founder
- Political party: Republican-Socialist Party
- Spouse: Georges Laguerre (m. 1888)

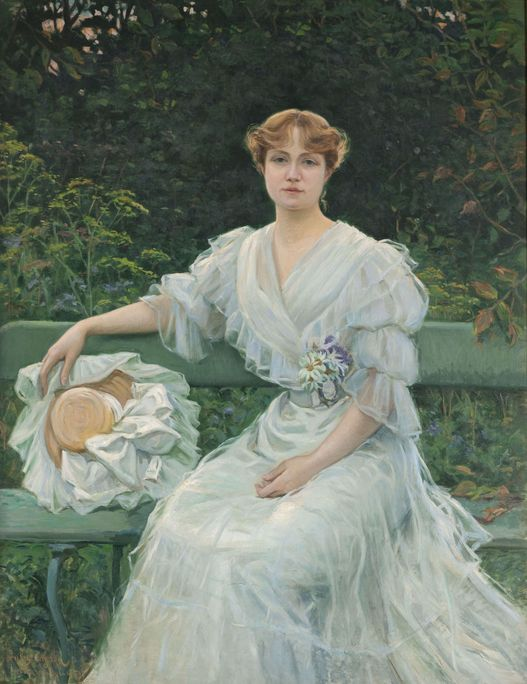
Marguerite Durand by Jules Cayron

Marguerite Durand (24 January 1864 – 16 March 1936) was a French stage actress, journalist, and a leading suffragette. She founded her own newspaper, and ran for election. She is also known for having a pet lion. The Bibliothèque Marguerite Durand was named in her honour for her contributions to the women's suffrage movement in France.

== Early life and acting career ==
Born into a middle-class family on 24 January 1864, Marguerite Durand was sent to study at a Roman Catholic convent. After finishing her primary education, she entered the Conservatoire de Paris before joining the Comédie Française, the oldest active theatre company in the world, in 1881.

In 1888, she gave up her career in the theatre to marry an up-and-coming young lawyer, Georges Laguerre.

== Politics ==
A friend and follower of the politically ambitious army general Georges Boulanger, her husband introduced her to the world of radical populist politics and involved her in writing pamphlets for the "Boulangists" movement. However, the marriage was short-lived, and in 1891 the couple separated after which Durand took a job writing for Le Figaro, the leading newspaper of the day. In 1896, the paper sent her to cover the Congrès Féministe International (International Feminist Congress) ostensibly to write a humorous article. She came away from the event a greatly changed person, so much so that the following year on 9 December 1897 she founded a feminist daily newspaper, La Fronde to pick up where Hubertine Auclert's La Citoyenne left off.

Durand's newspaper, run exclusively by women, advocated for women's rights, including admission to the Bar association and the École des Beaux-Arts. Its editorials demanded that women be allowed to be named to the Legion of Honor and to participate in parliamentary debates. Later in 1910, this came to include Durand's attempt to organise female candidates to stand for the legislative elections. However, Durand considered Marie Denizard's presidential candidacy in 1913 to be an "unfortunate joke" detrimental to the credibility of the feminist movement.

At the 1900 World's Fair in Paris, she organised the Congress For The Rights of Women. As well as establishing a summer residence for female journalists in Pierrefonds in the Picardy region, Durand turned to activism for working women, helping to organise several trade unions.

== Image ==
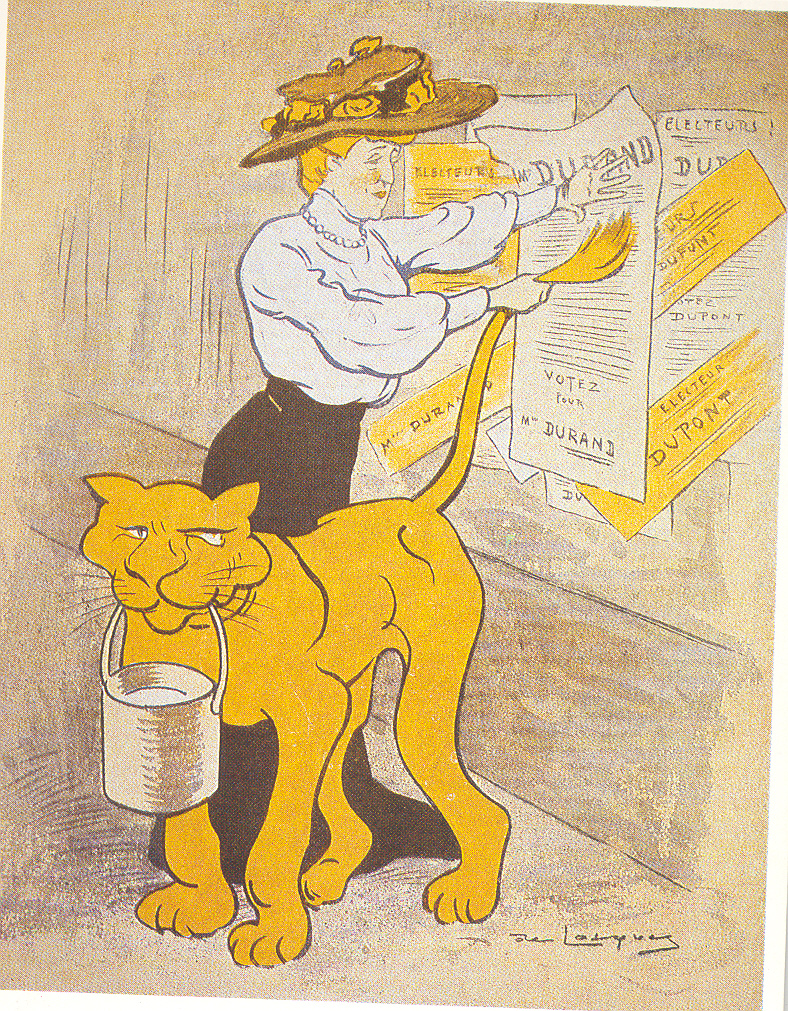
A poster supporting her election and featuring "Tiger"

Marguerite Durand, consumed by a passion for the equality of women, was an attractive woman of style and elegance who was famous for walking the streets of Paris with her pet lion she named "Tiger." Instrumental in the establishing of the zoological Cimetière des Chiens in the Parisian suburb of Asnières-sur-Seine where her lion was eventually interred, her activism raised the profile of feminism in France and Europe to an unprecedented level of respectability.

== Library ==
In the course of her life and activism she compiled an enormous collection of papers that she gave to the government in 1931. The following year, the Bibliothèque Marguerite Durand opened in Paris and still operates as a specialised public library run by the Paris municipal library system, where researchers can work beneath a portrait of Durand.
