= Hubertine Auclert =

French feminist and campaigner

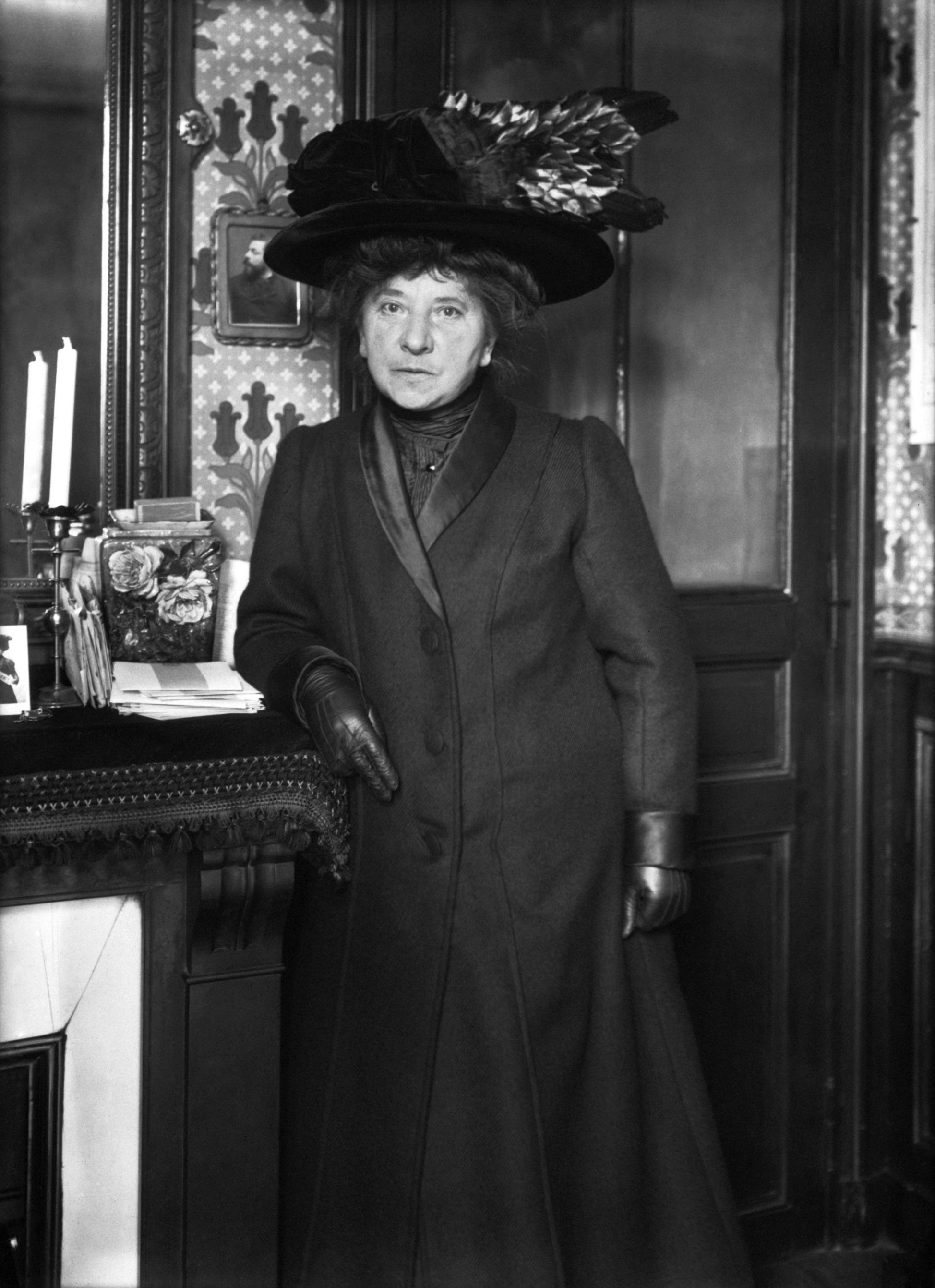
- Auclert in 1910
- Born: 10 April 1848; Allier, Auvergne, France
- Died: 4 August 1914 (aged 66); Paris, France
- Resting place: Père Lachaise Cemetery
- Occupations: Suffragist, feminist

Hubertine Auclert ([y.bɛʁ.tin o.klɛʁ]; France, 10 April 1848 – Paris, 4 August 1914) was a leading French feminist and a campaigner for women's suffrage.

== Early life ==
Born in the Allier département in the Auvergne area of France into a middle-class family, Hubertine Auclert's father died when she was 13 and her mother sent her to live and study in a Roman Catholic convent. As a young girl she planned to become a nun but left the convent at 16. Estranged from her mother, she lived with her uncle for a time but had to return to the convent a few years later. She left the convent for good in 1869 and moved to Paris in 1873. There, the ousting of Emperor Napoleon III and the establishment of the Third Republic opened the door to activism on the part of women, who began demanding changes to the Napoleonic Code to provide education and economic independence for women and the legalisation of divorce.

== Political activism and feminism ==
Auclert, inspired by the high-profile activities of Maria Deraismes and Léon Richer, became involved with feminist work and eventually took a job as Richer's secretary. Influenced by her life in a Catholic convent, and like many of the leading republican feminists at the time, she was a militant anticlerical. While the main focus of the French feminist movement was directed towards changes to the laws, Auclert pushed further by demanding that women be given the right to run for public office and claiming that the unfair laws would never have been passed had the views of women legislators been heard. In 1876, she founded the Société le droit des femmes (The Rights of Women) to support women's suffrage, and in 1883, the organization formally changed its name to the Société le suffrage des femmes (Women's Suffrage Society).

In 1878, the "International Congress on Women's Rights" was held in Paris but to the chagrin of Auclert, it did not support women's suffrage. Resolute, in 1880, Auclert began a tax revolt, arguing that without representation women should not be subjected to taxation. One of her legal advisors was attorney Antonin Lévrier, whom she later married. On 13 February 1881 she launched La Citoyenne, a monthly(page 899) that argued vociferously for women's enfranchisement. The paper received vocal support from even the elite in the feminist movement, such as Séverine, and socialite Marie Bashkirtseff wrote several articles for the newspaper. In her writings, she also brought the term feminism, a term first coined by Charles Fourier, into the English language in the 1890s.

At the Socialist Workers' Congress in Marseille in 1879, Auclert made passionate pleas for women's rights, but argued that they needed economic independence due to their "natural" motherhood. Auclert was on a special committee to consider the equality of women and was given an hour to speak to the congress on the subject. After her speech, she was invited to head a committee to prepare a statement on women's rights. The statement, which said women should have the same social, legal, political and working rights as men, was approved by the congress.

In 1884, the French government finally legalized divorce, but Auclert denounced it because of the law's blatant bias against women that still did not allow a woman to keep her wages. Auclert proposed the radical idea that there should be a marriage contract between spouses with separation of property.

== Algeria and feminism ==
Auclert, and her husband, moved to Algeria in 1888 where they would remain for four years until he died and she returned to Paris. While in Algeria, Auclert extensively studied and recorded the daily lives of Arab women. Auclert paralleled the male prejudice against women in France with the racial prejudice against the colonized in Algeria as the "French Algerians… do everything possible to keep the Arabs in a state of ignorance so conductive to exploitation and domination."

Her activism for the rights of Algerian women paralleled the "familial" or "maternalist" feminism that she advocated for in France. Such prejudice took form as French collusion with Arab males to suppress Arab women's education and to respect Islamic practices of child marriages, polygamy, and bride trade which restricted the rights of the Arab woman.

Auclert acted out of a moral duty to elevate the status of Arab women to make it possible for them to obtain the same dignity of French women. In Algeria and on her return to France, Auclert pursued legal action to acknowledge the rights of Arab women, such as petitions for improved education, and the abolition of polygamy. While her thoughts on Islamic culture were entrenched in imperial thinking, she made clear the negative influence of French colonialism on the societies in which they settled. She claimed that the oppression from Islamic law was made worse by collusion between the French administrators and Arab men. Arab males, in her eyes, appeared backwards in part because of the effects of racism from the French settlers. Because of male oppression, she saw the colonized women as the most significant sufferers. She claimed because of the patriarchy of both the Arabs and the French, the Algerian women were the least advanced socially, morally, and culturally.

She wrote about the consequences Arab women suffered because of Islam in the Algerian press: Le Radical Algérien, and in La Citoyenne. Unintentionally, her work in Algeria served as further justification for French colonialism as it highlighted the perceived degraded condition of Arab women under Algerian rule. No longer able to support La Citoyenne financially, the newspaper closed, but she continued her activism. In 1900, she witnessed the establishment of the "National Council of French Women" as an umbrella organisation for feminist groups in France all of which soon came to support suffrage.

=== Criticism ===
Julia Clancy-Smith, author of Islam, Gender, and Identities in the Making of French Algeria, writes that, though Auclert criticizes the negative influence of French colonialism, she is similar to contemporary British feminists in using a discourse of a "universal sisterhood" that was oxymoronically imperial and hierarchical to protect the colonized populations. While Auclert blamed French men for worsening the "barbarism" of Arab men and thus worsening the condition of Arab women, much of her rhetoric to advocate for Arab women painted them as victims of their religion.

Clancy-Smith quotes that Auclert claimed Arab men rendered the women "little victims of Muslim debauchery," and must be "freed from their cages, walled homes, and cloisters" to assimilate into Frenchwomen. Auclert's writing about Algerian women focused on, in Clancy-Smith's words, "the morally perverse sexual customs of the natives." For example, the most provocative section of Auclert's work detailed her argument that "Arab marriage is child rape." Clancy-Smith also critiques Auclert's success as an activist: all of the petitions that Auclert submitted on behalf of Algerian women were met with indifference, according to Auclert. There are no records of Muslim women's awareness or response to her advocacy. Clancy-Smith argues that Auclert returned to Paris in 1892 without "any concrete results," other than ironically convincing many in France that the Algerians were too barbaric and unsuitable for political rights.

== Later activism and death ==
In July 1907 married women in France were finally given incomplete control over their own salaries due to the lobbying of the Avant-Courrière (Forerunner) association led by Jeanne Schmahl.

If a woman bought something with her earnings that she did not consume herself, such as a piece of furniture, it became her husband's property unless there was a marriage contract that specified otherwise, which normally occurred with prosperous couples. In November 1907, the General Council of the Seine yielded to pressure from Auclert and gave its support to Paul Dussaussoy's 1906 bill proposing limited women's suffrage.

The 60-year-old Auclert continued her push for total equality. In 1908, she symbolically smashed a ballot box during municipal elections in Paris, and in 1910, she and Marguerite Durand defied authorities and presented themselves as candidates in the elections for members of the legislative assembly.

Considered one of the central figures in the history of the French women's rights movement, Auclert continued her activism until her death in 1914, at 66, the day after France declared war on Germany, entering World War I. She is interred in the Père Lachaise Cemetery in Paris; the sculpture on her tomb commemorates the "Suffrage des Femmes."

== Sources ==
- Clancy-Smith, Julia (1998), Islam, Gender, and Identities in the Making of French Algeria, 1830-1962.
- Fortescue, William (5 July 2017), The Third Republic in France, 1870-1940: Conflicts and Continuities, Taylor & Francis, ISBN 978-1-351-54000-1
- Frader, Laura Levine; Rose, Sonya O. (1996), Gender and Class in Modern Europe, Cornell University Press, ISBN 0-8014-8146-5
