= Pontru =

- Commune
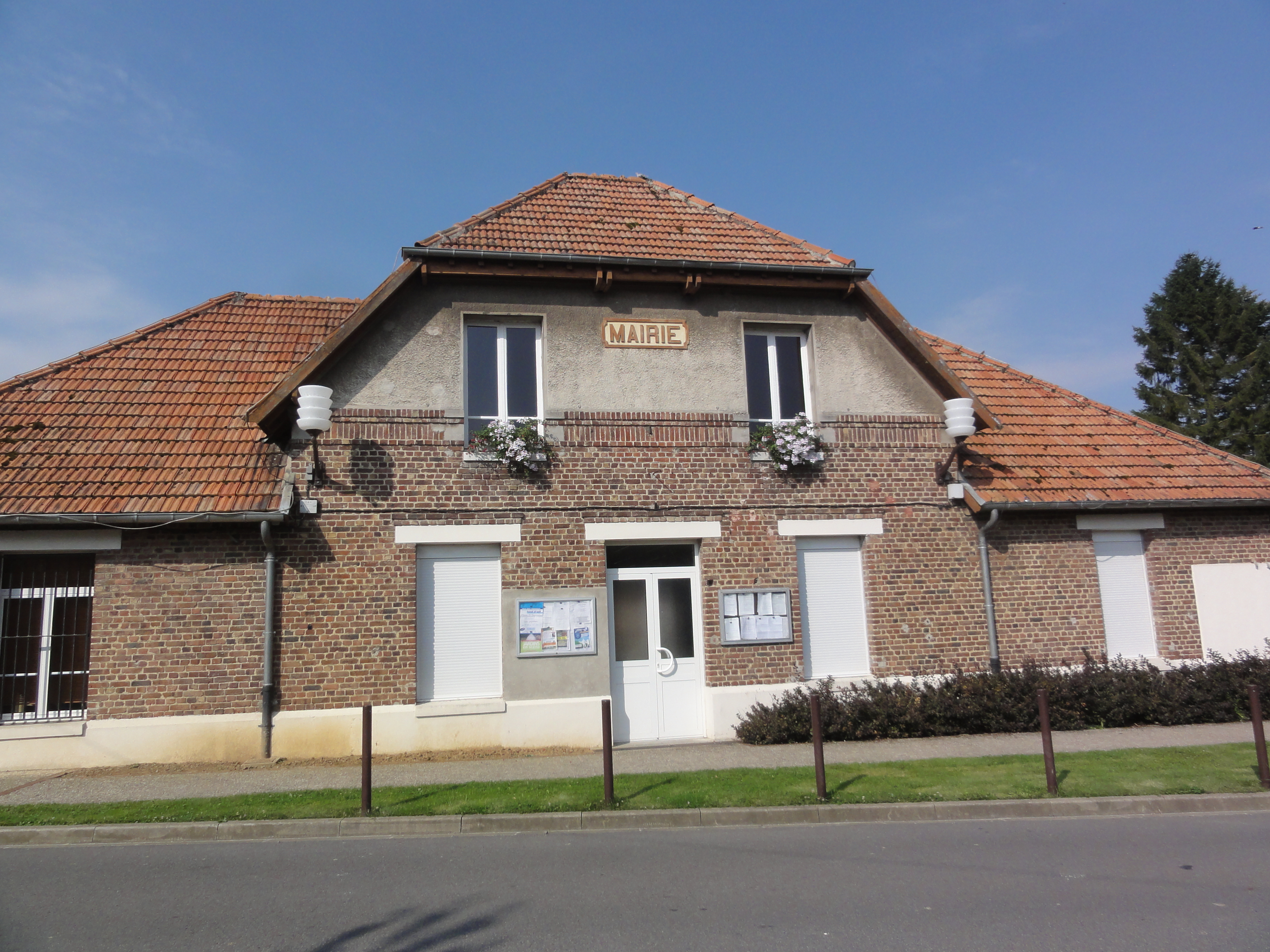
- Town hall
- Location of Pontru
- Location within France Location within Hauts-de-France
- Coordinates: 49°54′16″N 3°13′02″E
- Country: France
- Region: Hauts-de-France
- Department: Aisne
- Arrondissement: Saint-Quentin
- Canton: Saint-Quentin-1
- Intercommunality: Pays du Vermandois

Government
  - Mayor (2026–32): Erwann Kerbellec
- Area^{1}: 14.98 km^{2} (5.78 sq mi)
- Elevation: 69 m (226 ft)
- Highest elevation: 152 m (499 ft)
- Lowest elevation: 72 m (236 ft)
- Population (2023): 290
  - Density: 19/km^{2} (50/sq mi)
- Time zone: UTC+01:00 (CET)
  - Summer (DST): UTC+02:00 (CEST)
- INSEE/Postal code: 02614 /02490
- ^{1} French Land Register data, which excludes lakes, ponds, glaciers > 1 km^{2} (0.386 sq mi or 247 acres) and river estuaries.

Pontru is a commune in the Aisne department in Hauts-de-France in northern France.

== Population ==
Historical population
Year	Pop.	±% p.a.
1968	286	—
1975	253	−1.74%
1982	252	−0.06%
1990	247	−0.25%
1999	276	+1.24%
2007	305	+1.26%
2012	277	−1.91%
2017	251	−1.95%
2023	290	+2.44%
Source: INSEE

== See also ==
- Communes of the Aisne department
