= Vera Poska-Grünthal =

Estonian feminist

Vera Poska-Grünthal (1898–1986) was a leading Estonian feminist. She was one of the founders of the International Federation of Women Lawyers (IFWL), an International Non-Governmental Organization (NGO) that enhances the status of women and children by providing legal aid, legal literacy and education programs, and through advocacy, law reform, research and publications. She also founded the Estonian-language journal Triinu in Sweden in 1952, serving as its editor until 1981.

== Personal life ==
Vera Poska-Grünthal was born in Tallinn. She was the daughter of politician and lawyer Jaan Poska. She was married to politician and lawyer Timotheus Grünthal. American lawyer Sharon L. Gleason is her granddaughter.
