= La Fronde (newspaper) =

French feminist paper (1897–1926)

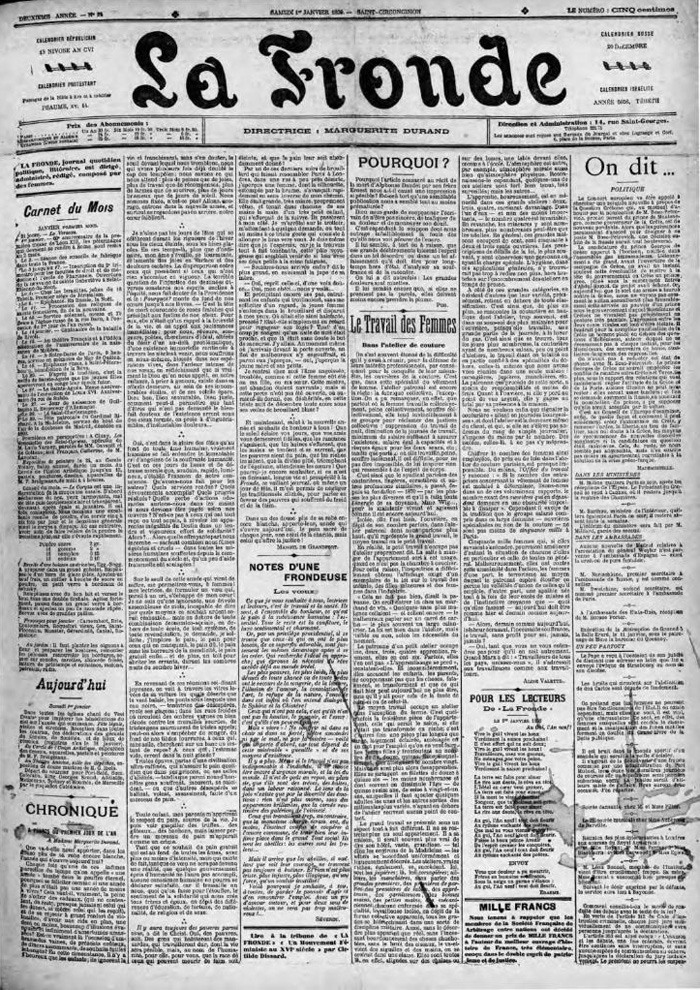
Front page of the 1 January 1898 issue of La Fronde

La Fronde (The Sling) was a French feminist newspaper first published in Paris on 9 December 1897 by activist Marguerite Durand (1864–1936). Durand, a well known actress and journalist, used her high-profile image to attract many notable Parisian women to contribute articles to her daily newspaper, which was the first of its kind in France to be run and written entirely by women. She also had experience on other reputable publications, including La Presse and Le Figaro.

== Circulation ==
La Fronde was financed by a donation of 7 million francs, from the Jewish banker Gustave de Rothschild. The paper began publication immediately following the Dreyfus affair, and published feuilletons modeled on mass newspapers. It was published daily initially, from 1897 to 1903, and then was published monthly from 1903 to 1905. Circulation for La Fronde briefly reached a peak of 50,000 but in September 1903 it had a massive press run of 200,000. However, financial problems forced the paper to cut back to a monthly publication, and then to close altogether in March 1905. It was revived briefly in 1914 and in 1926.

== Content ==
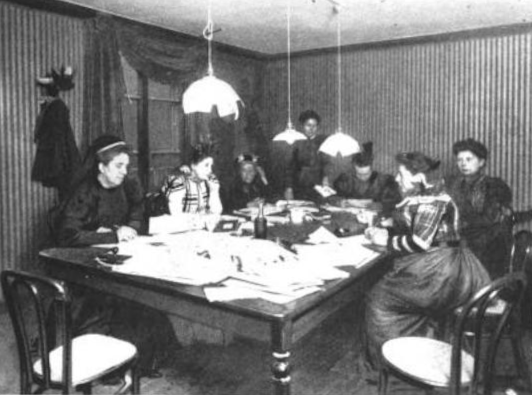
Reporters' room in 1898

The provocative title of the publication literally means slingshot and refers to the 1648–1653 Fronde rebellion against the monarchy in France. The frondeur tradition within journalism derives from this rebellion against Mazarin, the past chief minister of France. This allusion in the title was an alignment with the frondeur notion that marginalized groups had the right to engage in dialogues about matters of importance.

The paper gave extensive coverage to a broad range of feminist issues and profiled such things as Jeanne Chauvin's demand that the French government grant her the right to practice law and Madeleine Pelletier's argument for her right to become a psychiatrist. To send a message of equality the paper indicated the current date according to a variety of calendars such as the French Revolutionary calendar, the Jewish calendar, and the Gregorian. It was responsible for engaging women in non-domestic issues of social reform and activism, and eventually its focus shifted to emphasize militarism and republicanism, as well as reform of the civil code. The publication's revival was an attempt to "galvanize" World War I French patriotism. Immediately prior to the closing of the publication, it had changed its focus to suffragism.

== Gender ==
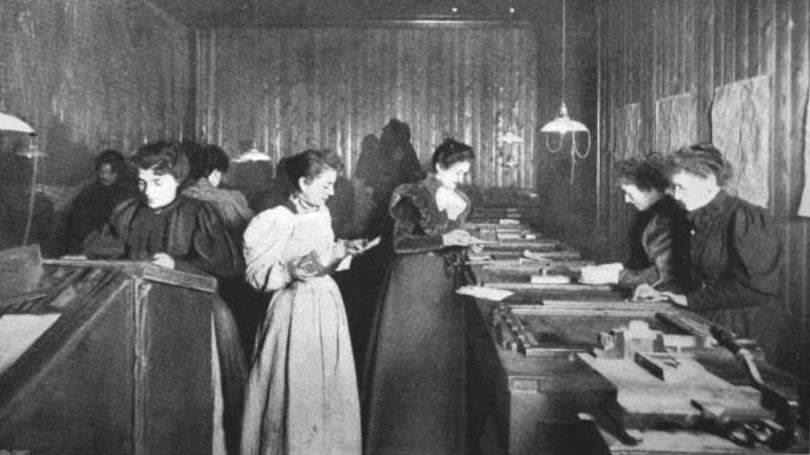
Composing room in 1898

La Fronde was highly unusual in its subversion of normative gender relations and roles. For instance, not only were the workers all women, with the exception of the building's caretaker, but they were also paid the same wage as men. Furthermore, it was a forum for such topics as sports, education, politics, etc., all of which were traditionally male topics. The journalists on La Fronde had to go to great lengths to ensure their access to places which were not open to women, such as Parliament. They would also use pseudonyms, such as Severine, which was the pseudonym of well-known anarchist contributor Caroline Rémy de Guebhard. It was these practices which both concerned and created public interest in the paper. It was widely critiqued as militantly feminist, imitating male styles of writing, and confusing by its representation of conflicting perspectives which lacked continuity. But this last critique was likely in actuality an enactment of the popular strategy in nineteenth century feminism to deconstruct republicanism by pointing out contradictions and inconsistencies. For instance, its inclusion of women who were solely mothers and those in the workforce contested the singularity of women's so-called destiny. La Fronde monumentally fostered the concept that women were knowledgeable and opinionated on traditionally male issues and spheres, and actively criticized fanciful representations of women in literature and the media.

== See also ==
- Femina
- La Française
