= Timeline of Brussels (19th century) =

The following is a timeline of the history of Brussels, Belgium, in the 19th century.

== 1801–1813 – French period ==
- 1801
  - 8 July: The Brussels Stock Exchange is founded by decree of First Consul Napoleon.
  - 1 September: The Museum of Fine Arts is founded by decree of Napoleon.
- 1802 – 26 August: The city becomes one of the twenty-four Principal towns of the First French Republic.
- 1803 – Napoleon visits the city.
- 1804 – 8 May: The city becomes one of the Bonnes villes de l'Empire.
- 1805 – D'Ieteren is established by the master coachbuilder Joseph-Jean D'Ieteren.
- 1806 – 25 March: The Academy of Brussels, an academy of the Imperial University of France, is established.
- 1808 – The Laeken Gate is demolished.
- 1810
  - Emperor Napoleon officially visits the city.
  - 19 May: An ordinance is issued to demolish the city's fortifications and build the Small Ring.
  - 14 December: The Bar Association of Brussels is established by imperial decree.

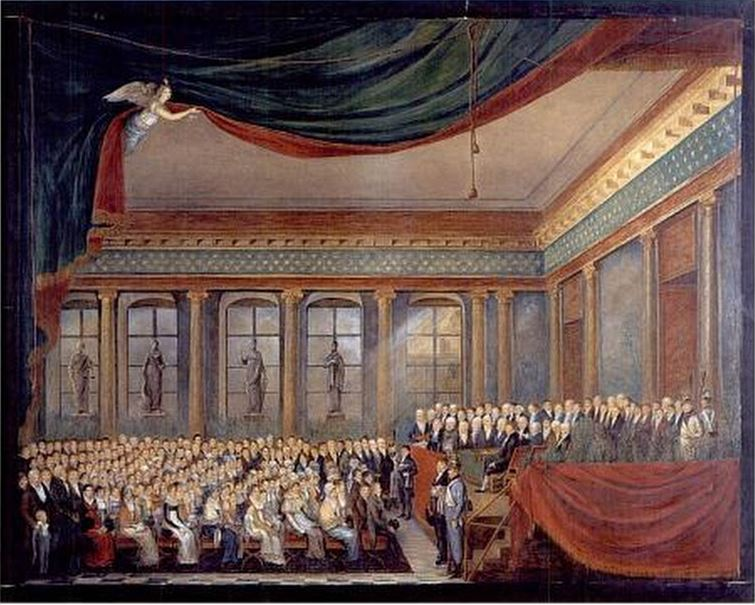
Award Ceremony at the first Salon, Marie de Latour, 4 November 1811

- 1811 – 4 November: The first Brussels Salon is held.
- 1812 – The Wolfers goldsmiths from Linden, modern-day Germany, establish themselves in the city, continuing their jewellery practice there.
- 1813 – The Royal Conservatory of Brussels is founded.

== 1814–1829 – Dutch period ==
- 1814
  - 30 March: Prince William of Orange-Nassau enters the city.
  - 31 July: Enthronement of King William I of the Netherlands.

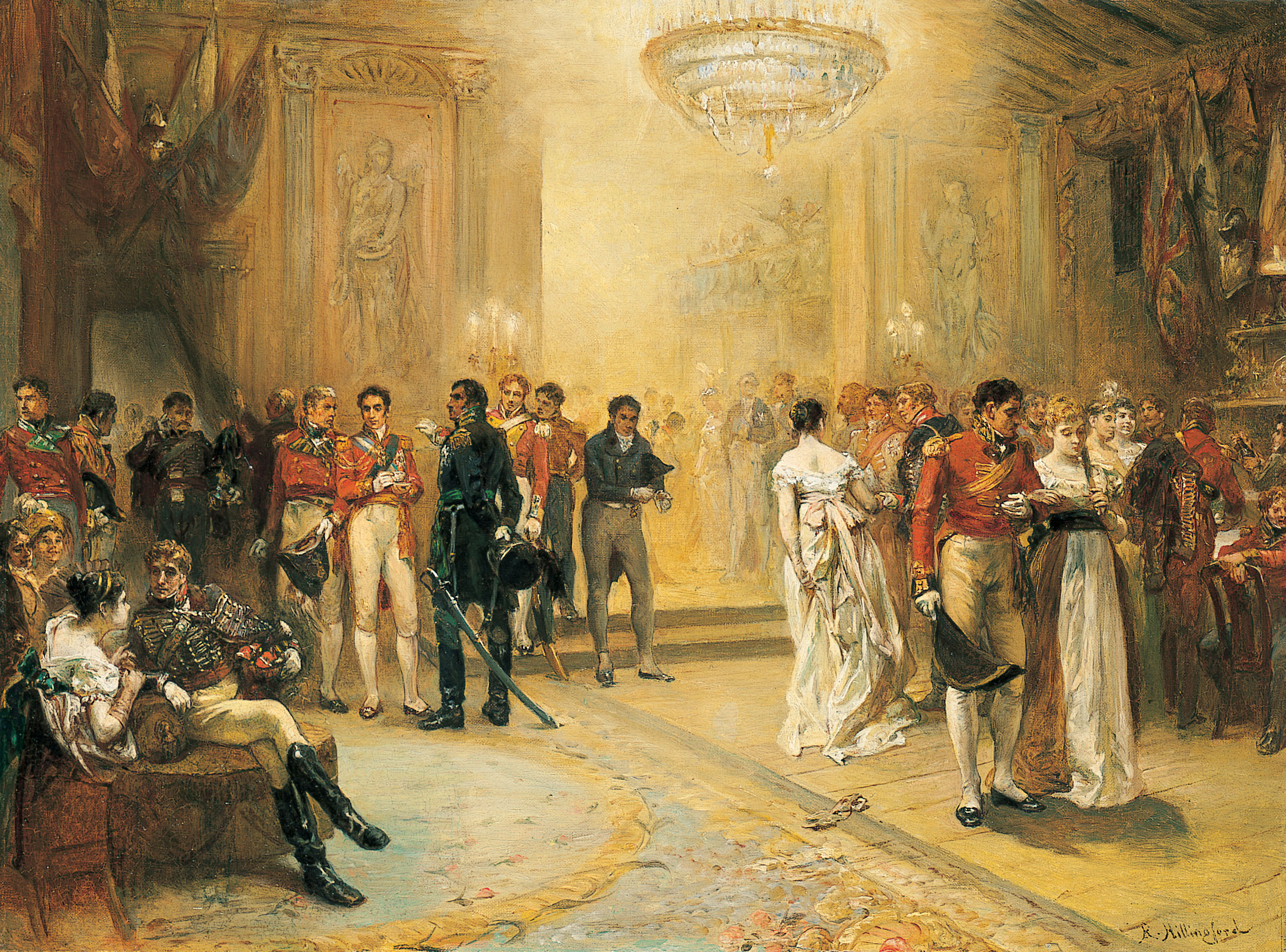
The Duchess of Richmond's Ball (15 June 1815), Robert Alexander Hillingford, 1870s

- 1815
  - 22 May: Hanoverian and Brunswicker troops are stationed in Monplaisir to prepare for the Battle of Waterloo.
  - 15 June: The Duchess of Richmond's ball takes place.
  - 24 August: The city becomes the joint capital of the United Kingdom of the Netherlands.
  - September: The States General of the Netherlands meets at the Town Hall, chaired by the King.
- 1816
  - The Imperial and Royal Academy, suppressed under the French regime, is restored.
  - Lord Byron stays in the city, where he writes portions of Childe Harold's Pilgrimage.
  - 25 September: Athenaeums (secondary schools) are established in the city.

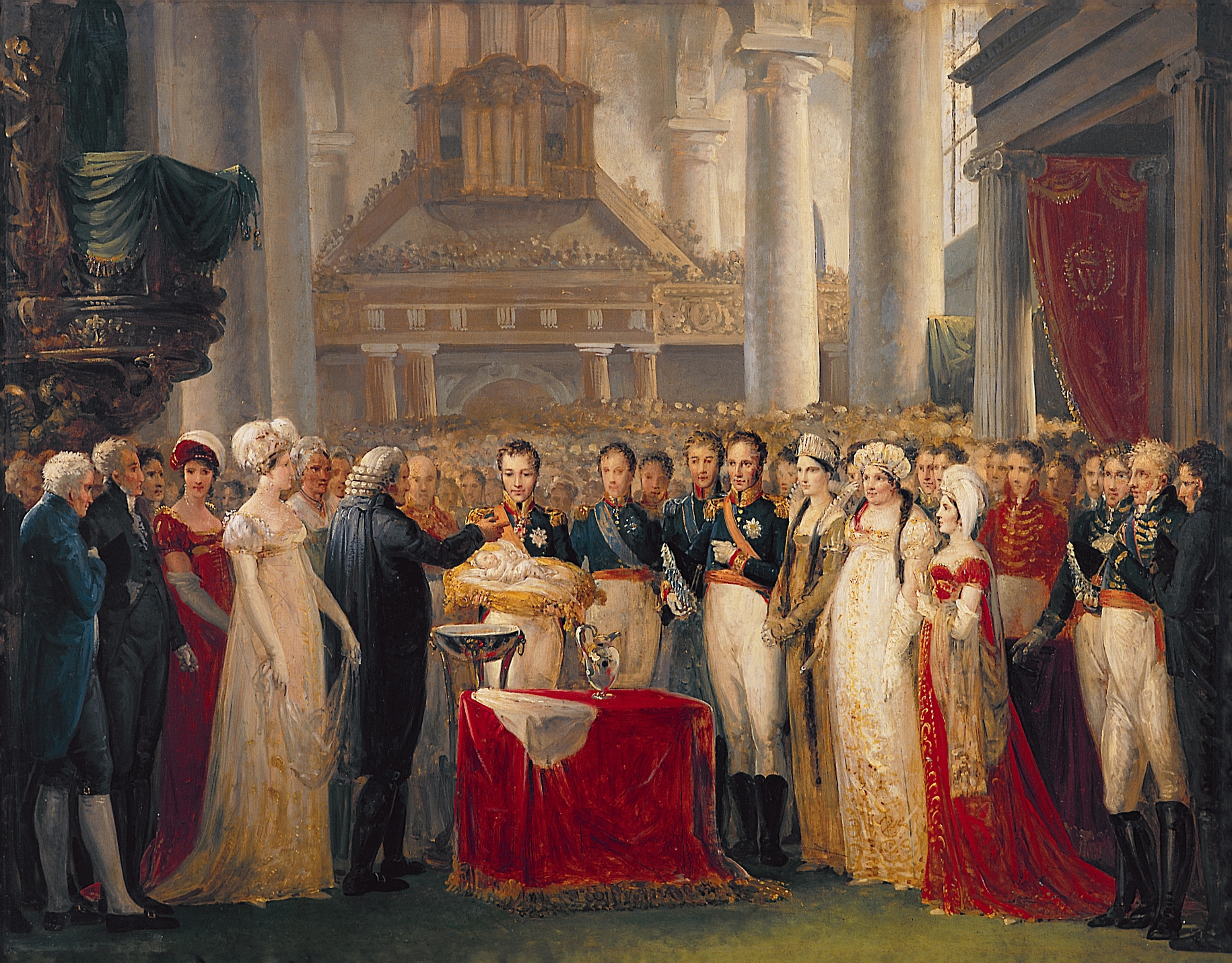
Baptism of King William III of the Netherlands in the Temple of the Augustinians, 1817

- 1817
  - 19 February: King William III of the Netherlands is born in the Palace of the Nation.
  - 6 December: Manneken Pis is returned following public outcry after Antoine Licas or Lycas, a freed convict, stole it on the night of 4–5 December.
- 1819
  - The city takes control of Jean-Baptiste Van Mons' experimental La Fidélité orchard, once the city's largest, in order to parcel it out.
  - 24 August: The first gas works in continental Europe open on the Rue Saint-Roch/Sint-Rochusstraat, built by the Brian and Fischer Company, lighting the new boulevards from the Willebroek Canal to the Schaerbeek Gate.
  - 25 May: The new Theatre of La Monnaie is inaugurated.

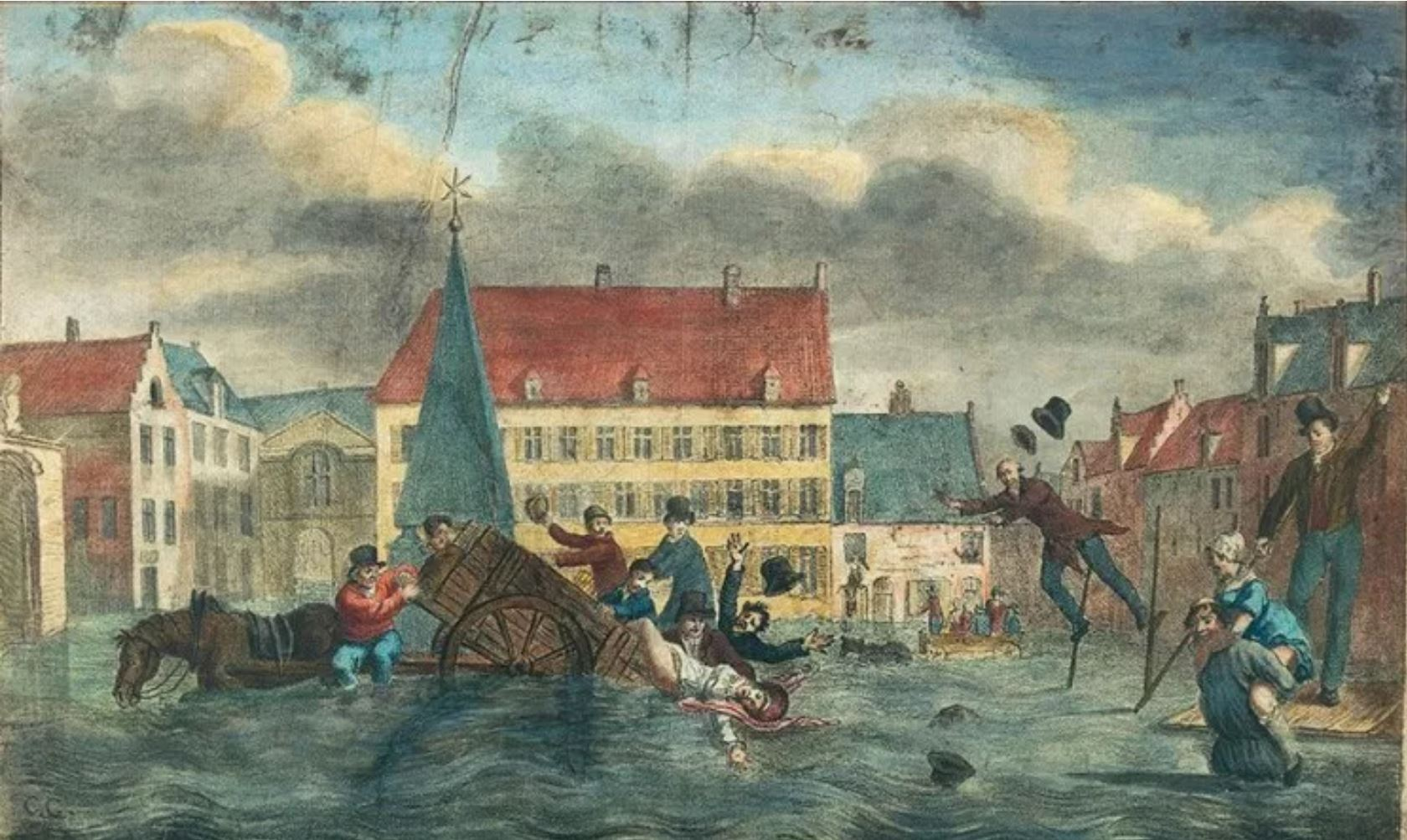
Flooding on the Place Saint-Géry/Sint-Goriksplein, January 1820

- 1821
  - De Wijngaard is integrated into 't Mariacranske.
  - The liberal Courrier des Pays-Bas newspaper starts publication succeeding Vrai Libéral.
- 1822
  - The Algemeene Nederlandsche Maatschappij ter Begunstiging van de Volkvlijt is established by King William I.
  - The Confraternity of St. Dorothea is reestablished as the Société de Flore.
- 1823 – The Société des douze is established as a continuation of the Société de littérature de Bruxelles.
- 1826 – 8 June: The Royal Observatory of Belgium is founded by King William I under the impulse of Adolphe Quetelet.
- 1827
  - The Grand Hospice Pachéco is built.
  - 7 May: The first kindergarten in the city opens.
- 1828
  - The Academy Palace is built.
  - The Place des Barricades/Barricadenplein, then called the Place d'Orange/Oranjeplein, is laid out.
  - 21 October: The Société de Bienfaisance urbaine is established by the lawyer Jean Pauwels.
- 1829
  - The Delvaux leather luxury goods brand is established by Charles Delvaux.
  - Maison Dandoy biscuiterie is established on the Rue au Beurre/Boterstraat by Jean-Baptiste Dandoy.
  - 1 September: The Botanical Garden of Brussels opens.

== 1830–1900 – Post-independence ==
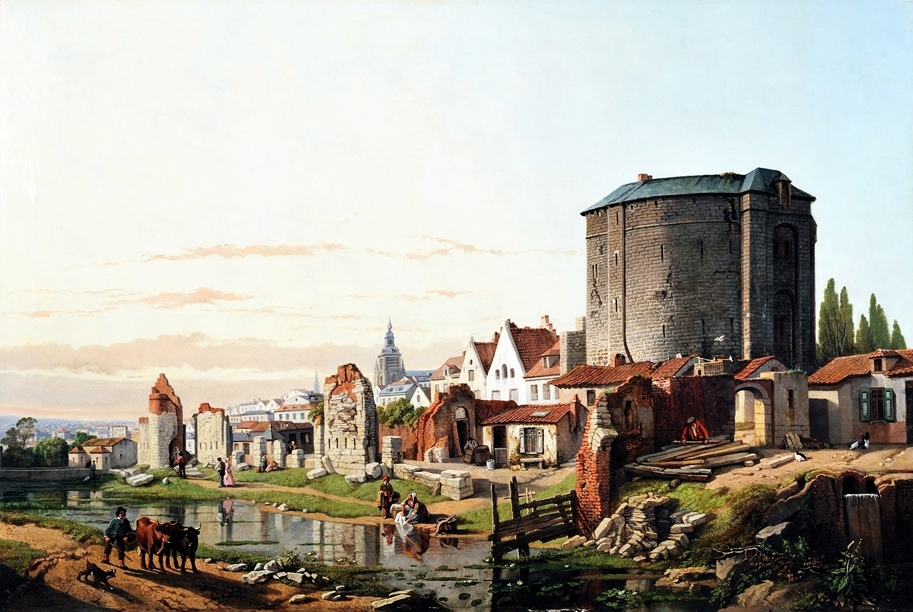
View of the remnants of Brussels' city walls near the Halle Gate, 1830–31

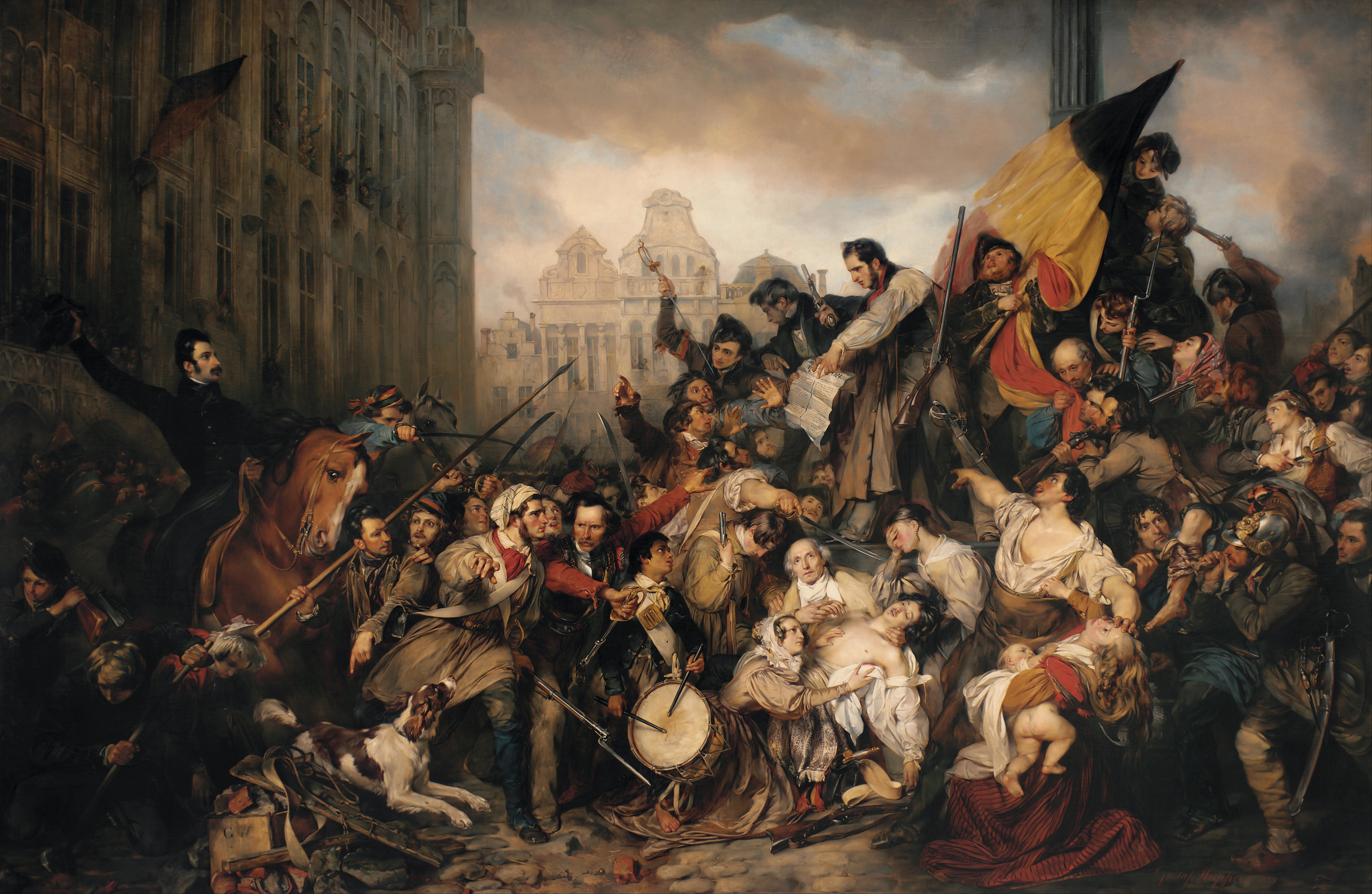
Episode of the Belgian Revolution of 1830, Gustaf Wappers, 1834

- 1830
  - Population: 98,279 city; 120,981 metro.
  - The Établissement géographique de Bruxelles is founded by Philippe Vandermaelen.
  - The Royal Theatre Toone is founded.
  - The first Exhibition of Products of Belgian Industry is held.
  - 25 August: The Belgian Revolution begins in the city when riots break out after a performance of La muette de Portici at the Theatre of La Monnaie.
  - 26 August: Lucien Jottrand and Édouard Ducpétiaux design the first Belgian flag, with samples made by Marie Abts-Ermens.
  - 27 August: The Bourgeois Guard is established to contain the revolt and restore public order.
  - 3 September: Prince William arrives in the city, agrees to the separation of the North and the South under the House of Orange-Nassau, but the king and States General hesitate as independence sentiment grows among Belgian dissidents.
  - 7 September: Volunteers arrive from Liège.
  - 22 September: Prince Frederick informs the city's people that King William I acknowledges their grievances but order needs to be restored, announcing his plan to enter the city the next day, prompting the revolt's leaders to flee from the army.
  - 23 September: Prince Frederick leads the Dutch Army into the city to quell the rebellion.
  - 24 September: The Provisional Government is formed and gives command of the Belgian Army to Juan Van Halen.
  - 27–26 September: The Dutch Army retreats from the city under Prince Frederick's orders.
  - 4 October: The Provisional Government declares Belgium's independence from the Dutch.
  - 22 October: Nicolas-Jean Rouppe is appointed the first Mayor of Brussels in an independent Belgium by royal decree.
  - 3 November: Elections for the National Congress take place.
- 1831
  - 7 February: The Constitution of Belgium is ratified and Article 126 proclaimes the city as "capital of Belgium and seat of the Belgian Government".
  - 25 February: Érasme-Louis Surlet de Chokier takes the constitutional oath at the Palace of the Nation.
  - 21 July: King Leopold I takes the constitutional oath at the Place Royale/Koningsplein.
  - 2–12 August: King William I's troops, sent to recapture the city, only reach Leuven before retreating after the Belgian Government appeals to France for military support, prompting France to send reinforcements under Marshal Étienne Maurice Gérard.
  - 8 September: The inaugural elections for the Belgian Parliament take place, leading to the dissolution of the National Congress.
- 1832
  - A cholera epidemic kills over 3,000.
  - The School of Veterinary Medicine and Rural Economics is established by King Leopold I.
  - 22 September: The Brussels–Charleroi Canal opens.
- 1833 – 23 February: The Grand Orient of Belgium secedes from the Grand Orient of the Netherlands.
- 1834
  - 7 February: The Royal Military Academy is founded.
  - 5–6 April: The city's nobility is looted by pro-Belgian protesters on the Orangist nobility.
  - 20 November: The Free University of Belgium is founded.

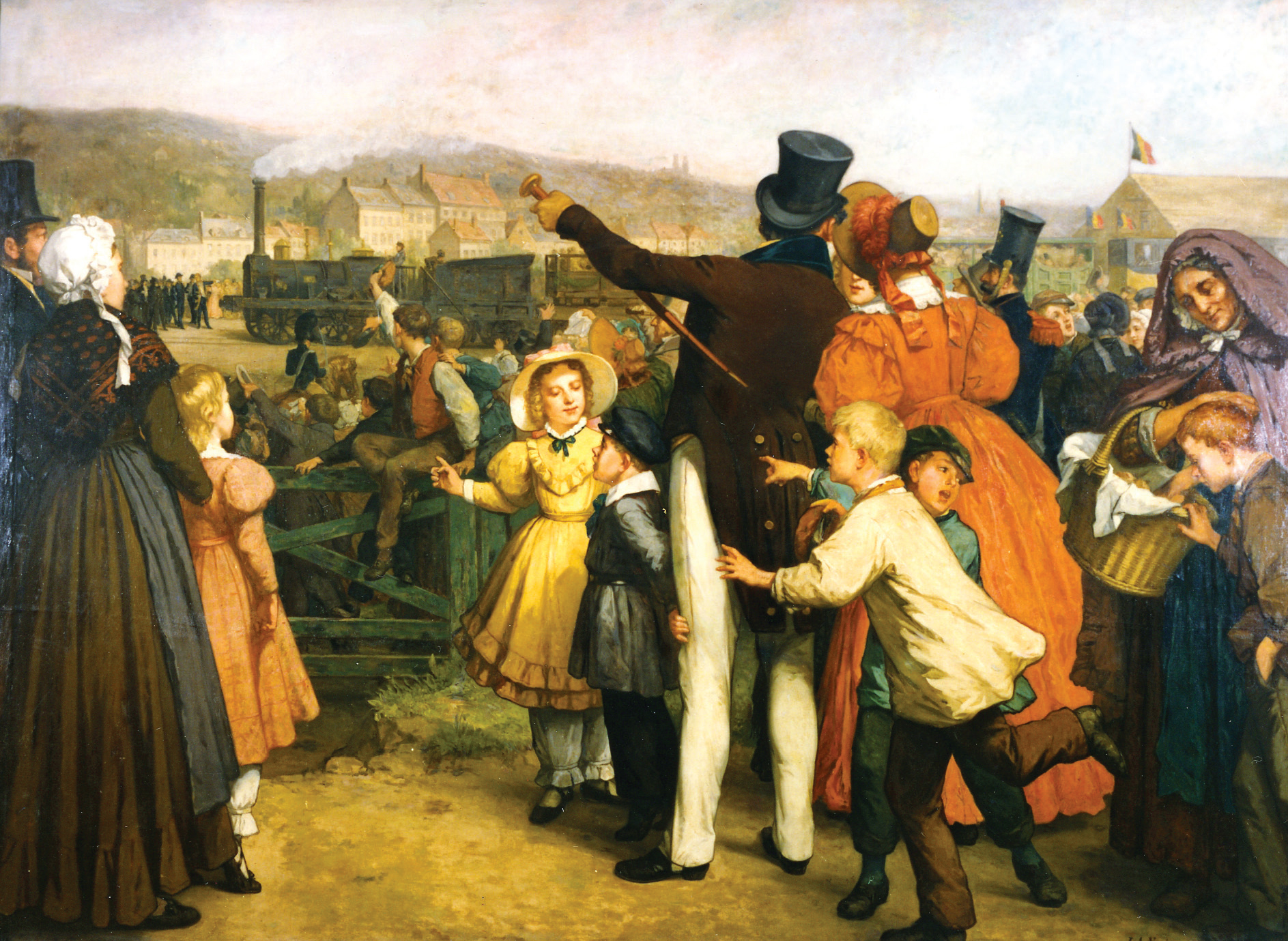
Opening of the Brussels–Mechelen railway, 5 May 1835

- 1835
  - Former members of the Société de Flore establish Les Vrais Amis de Linné.
  - 5 May: The first passenger train on a public railway in continental Europe departs from the Allée Verte/Groendreef railway station.
- 1836 – 22 February: The Brussels Meridian is installed in the Cathedral of St. Michael and St. Gudula.
- 1837
  - The Bollandist Society is reestablished under the patronage of the Belgian Government.
  - 19 June: The Royal Library of Belgium is founded.
- 1838 – 13 September: Guillaume-Hippolyte van Volxem is appointed mayor by royal decree.
- 1841 – 14 April: François-Jean Wyns de Raucour is appointed mayor by royal decree.
- 1842
  - Charlotte and Emily Brontë enroll at the boarding school run by Constantin Heger, located at what is now the Centre for Fine Arts.
  - 8 February: The Cercle du Parc private club is established when a group of Belgicist noblemen left the Orangist Cercle de l'Union.
  - 3 April: The Flemish-minded Nederduitsch Tael- en Letterkundig Genootschap is established.
- 1843
  - Richard de Querelles publishes Le déluge à Bruxelles, the first comic to be published in the city.
  - 29 May: A guestbook starts to be kept for official visits to the Town Hall, with King Leopold I as the first to sign it.
- 1844 – The Belgian-Bavarian friturist Jean Frédéric Krieger, also known as Monsieur Fritz, opens Fritz à l'instar Paris, the first friterie in the city.
- 1845
  - Saint Mary's Royal Church begins construction.
  - The first telegraph line links the city with Antwerp.
- 1846
  - Population: 123,874 city.
  - 31 March: The Museum of Natural Sciences is founded.
  - 24 September: The Société Pantechnique et Palingénésique des Agathopèdes is founded by Antoine Schayes.

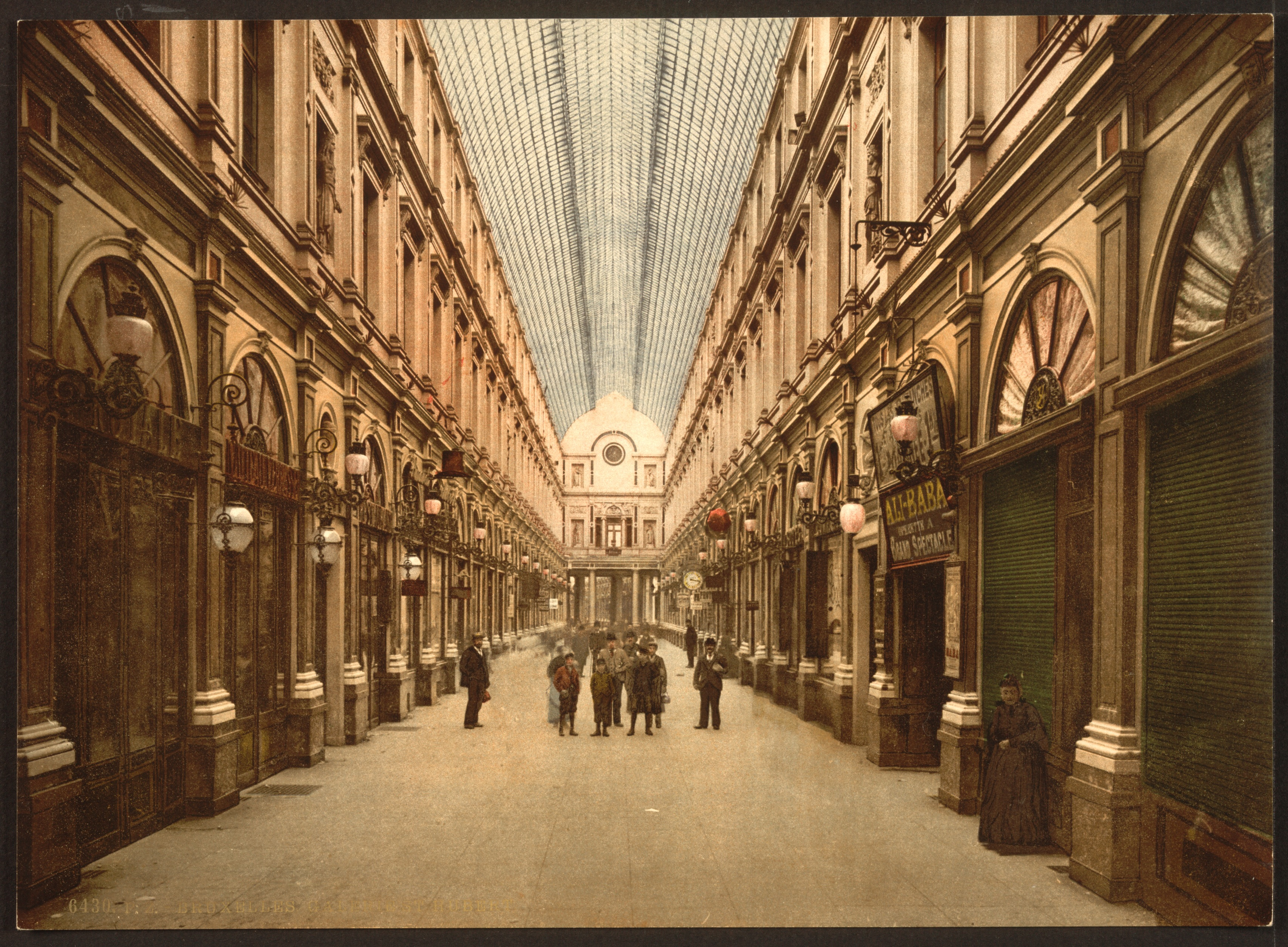
The Royal Saint-Hubert Galleries, built in 1847

- 1847
  - The Avenue Louise/Louizalaan is commissioned.
  - May: Systematic construction of sidewalks begins.
  - 1 January: The Deutsche-Brüsseler-Zeitung begins publication.
  - 20 June: The Royal Saint-Hubert Galleries open alongside the Théâtre royal des Galeries.
  - August: The German Workers' Society is founded in the city by Karl Marx and Friedrich Engels.

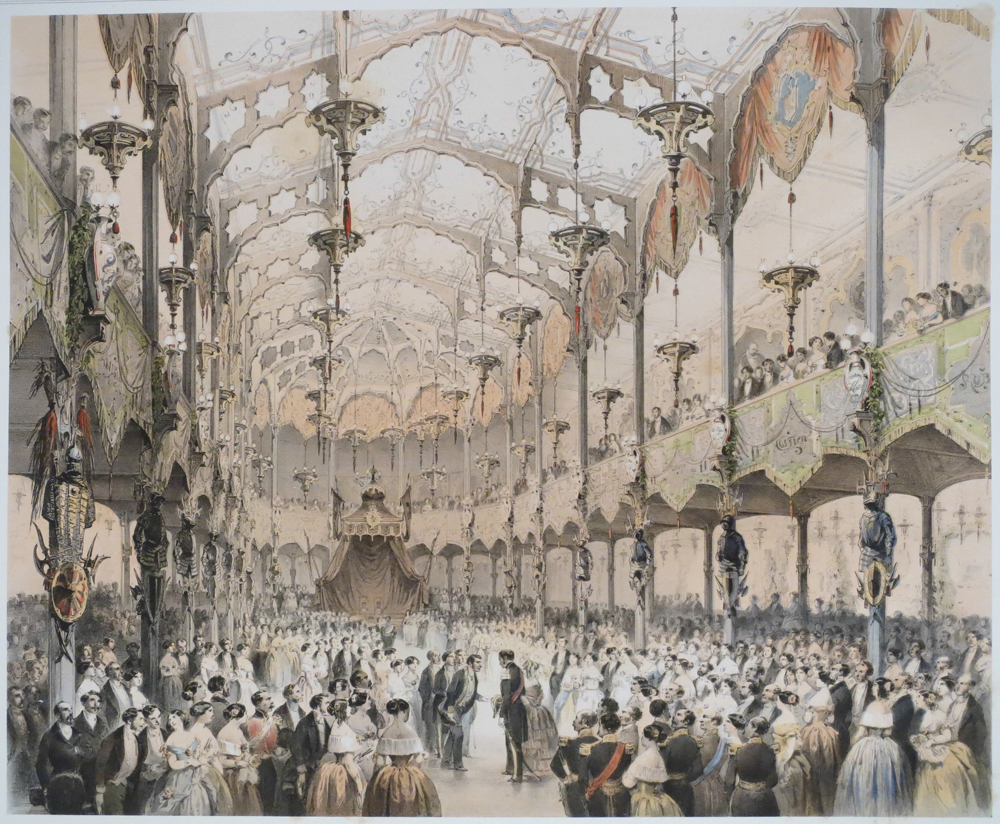
Party given by the Cercle artistique et littéraire de Bruxelles in the Madeleine Hall, 26 September 1848

- 1848
  - 4 March: Karl Marx is arrested and expelled after spending three years in the city, where he wrote The Communist Manifesto and contributed to the Deutsche-Brüsseler-Zeitung.
  - September: The second International Peace Congress is held in the city.
  - 5 October: Charles de Brouckère becomes mayor.
  - 23 November: The Cercle artistique et littéraire de Bruxelles artist collective is established with Adolphe Quetelet as its first president.

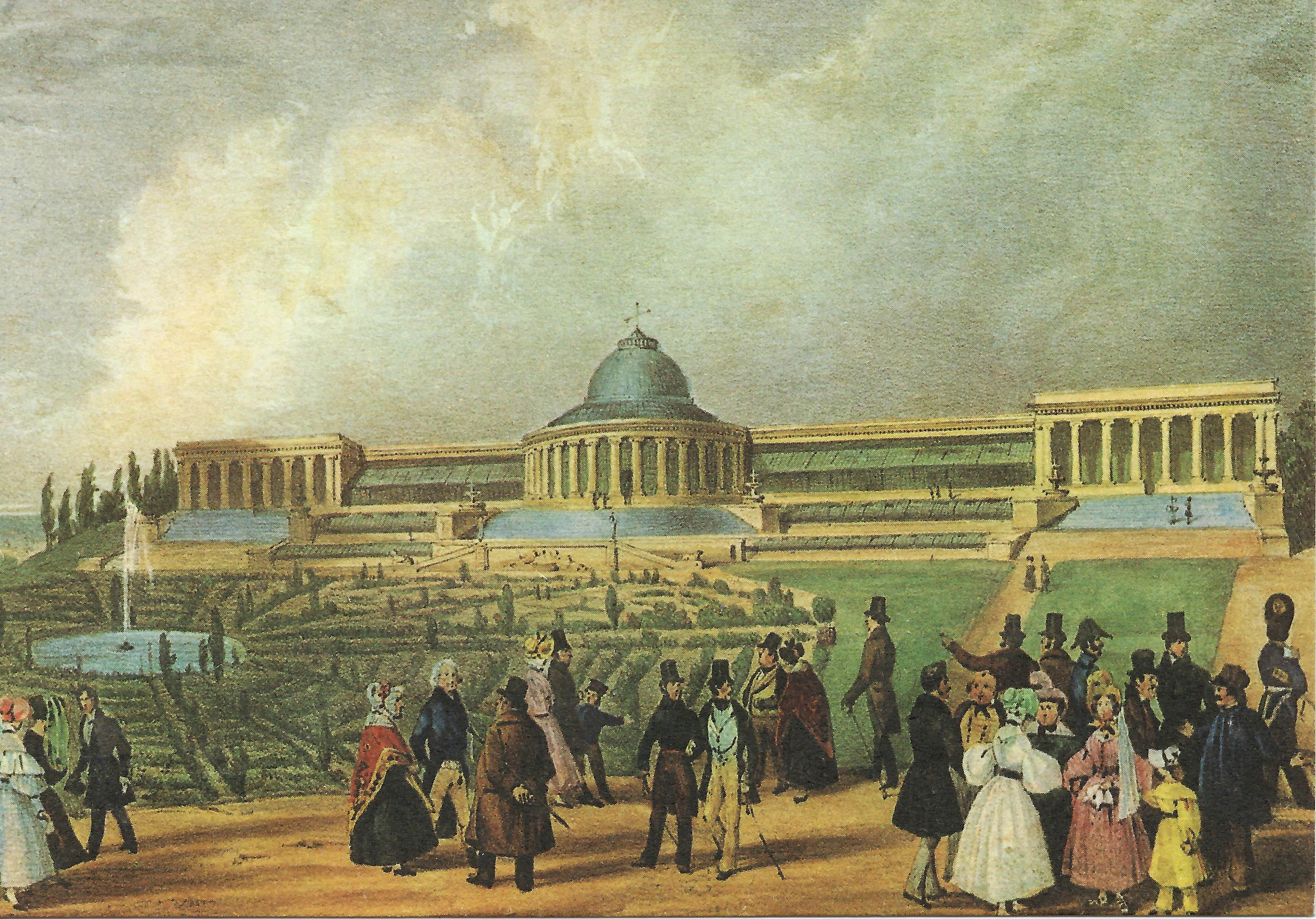
The Botanical Garden of Brussels, c. 1850

- 1850
  - Population: 142,289 city; 222,424 metro.
  - 5 May: The National Bank of Belgium is established by Minister Walthère Frère-Orban, replacing the Société générale de Belgique as fiscal agent of the Belgian Government.
- 1851
  - 30 August: The Société royale de zoologie, d'horticulture et d'agrément de la Ville de Bruxelles is founded to manage the Brussels Zoo.
  - 6 October: The École moyenne A is founded within the Free University of Brussels.
- 1852 – The Tooneel der Volksbeschouwing is established as a permanent Flemish theatre company in the city.
- 1853
  - Pogge and his wife move from Ternat to Schaerbeek.
  - 21 August–4 September: Bullfighters from Spain perform in a purpose-built arena on today's Place Solvay/Solvayplein.
  - 7 April: The European Quarter is annexed from Saint-Josse-ten-Noode, Etterbeek and Schaerbeek by the City of Brussels.

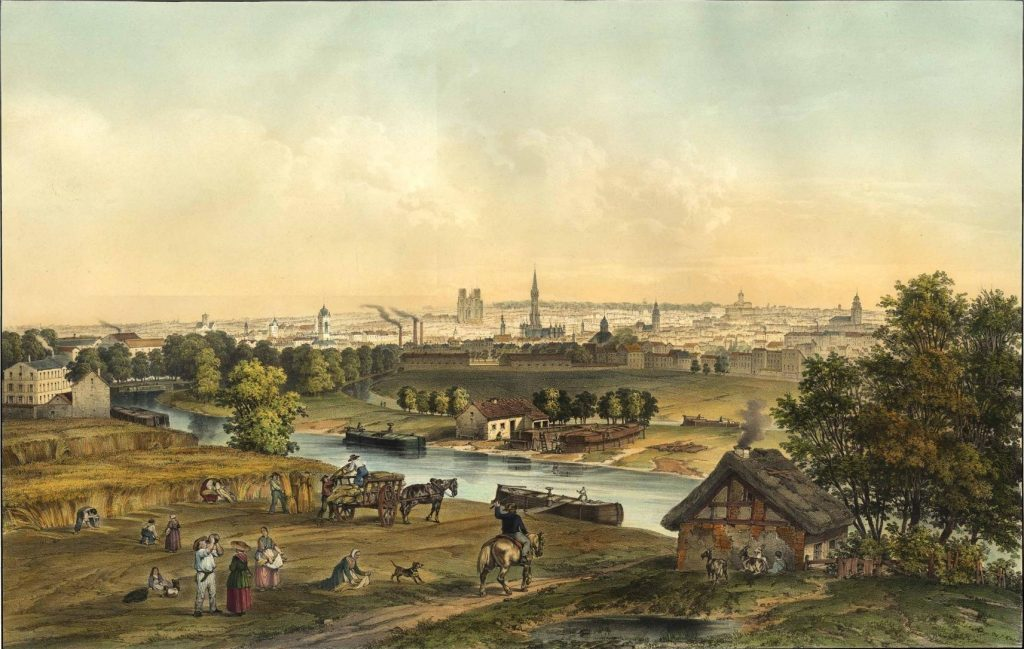
View into Brussels along the Brussels–Charleroi Canal from Molenbeek-Saint-Jean, c. 1855

- 1855
  - The last public execution is held at the Halle Gate.
  - 21 January: A fire at the Royal Theatre of La Monnaie results in the deaths of three firefighters, leaving only the exterior walls and portico standing.
  - 4 June: The Aqueduct of Mont-Saint-Pont opens to carry water from Braine-l'Alleud to the city.
  - 24 August: Leopold Quarter railway station opens.

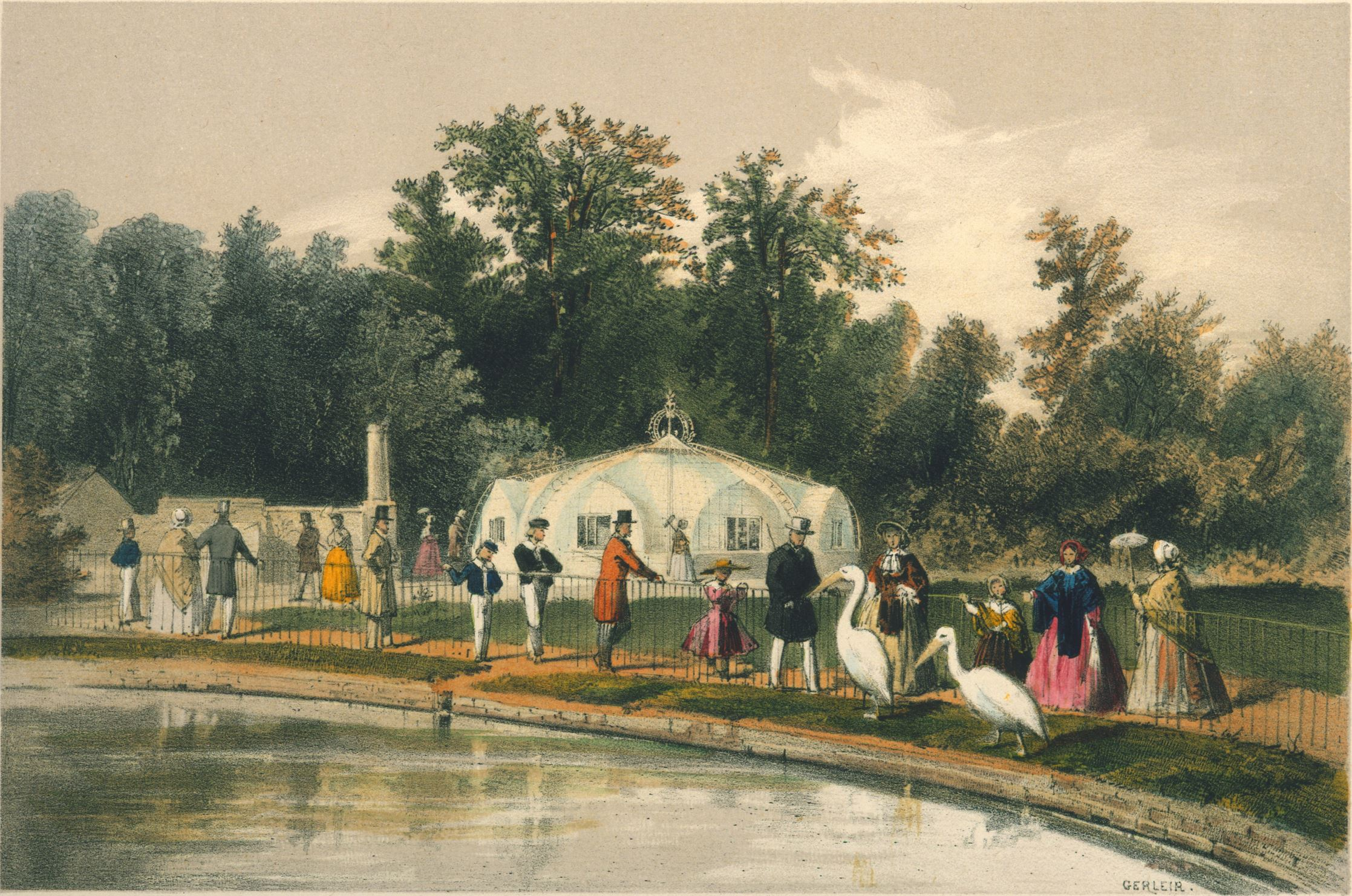
View of the Brussels Zoological Garden, 1856

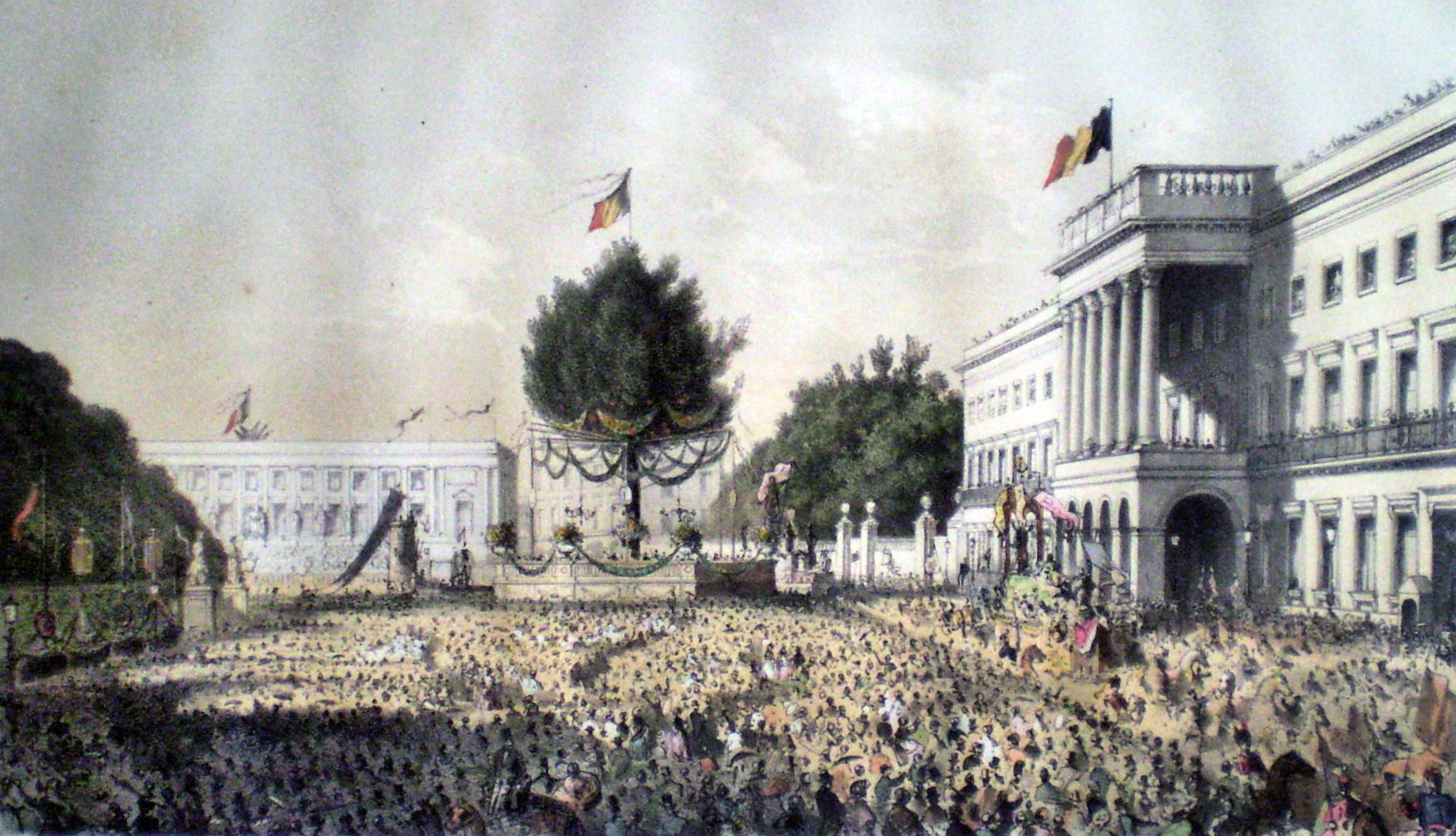
Celebrations for Belgian National Day in Brussels, 21 July 1856

- 1856
  - 28 March: The reconstructed Royal Theatre of La Monnaie opens.
  - 11 June: The Société royale belge des aquarellistes is founded under the chairmanship of Jean-Baptiste Madou.

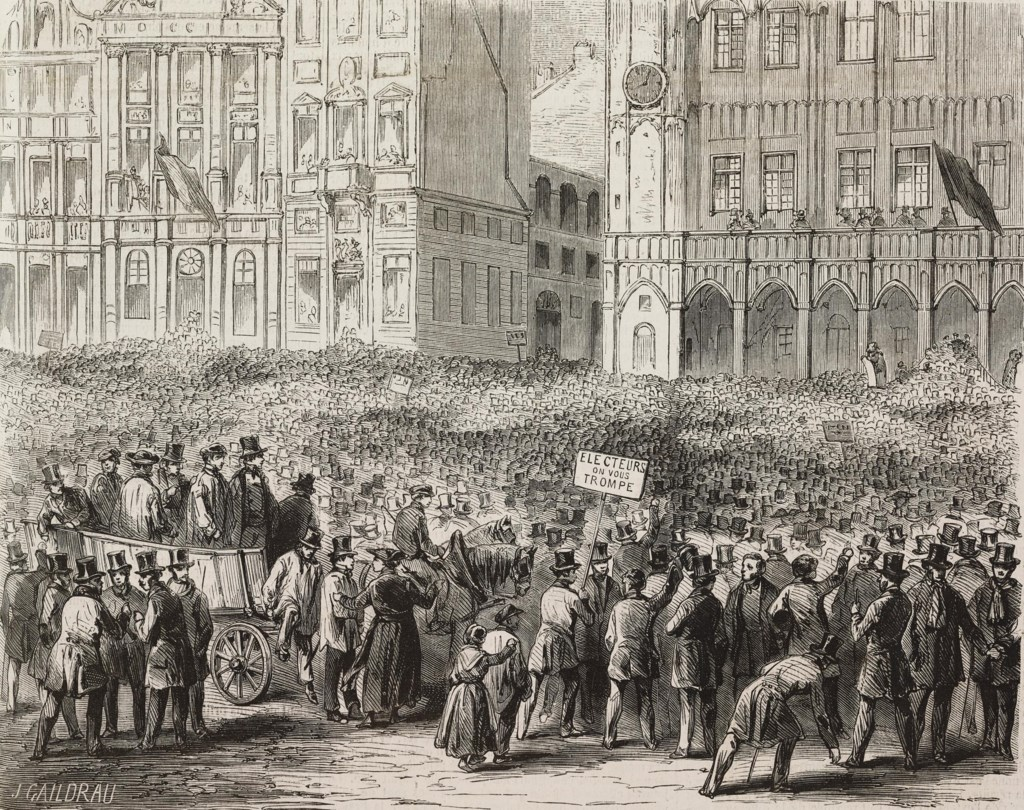
Drawing of a crowd on the Grand-Place during the elections of 1857

- 1857
  - The Ancienne Belgique opens.
  - Saint-Louis University moves to the city from Mechelen.
  - The first municipal water service is established.
- 1859
  - The Congress Column is erected.
  - The first National Shooting Range is established on the Place Dailly/Daillyplein.
  - 3 October: Multatuli completes Max Havelaar after only a month of writing, while residing in the city.
- 1860
  - Population: 185,982 city; 300,341 metro.
  - Au Bon Marché is established by François Vaxelaire.
  - 21 April: André-Napoléon Fontainas becomes mayor.
  - 21 July: Taxes and tolls at city gates are abolished under Walthère Frère-Orban, sparking celebrations but also causing financial shortfalls, which lead to a new system managed by national and provincial authorities.
- 1861 – The Bois de la Cambre/Ter Kamerenbos is laid out.
- 1862
  - The Russian Orthodox Church of St. Nicolas the Wonderworker is founded by Nikolay Alexeyevich Orlov, establishing the city's first Russian Orthodox community.
  - 28 November: The Congregation of the Immaculate Heart of Mary is established in Scheut by Théophile Verbist.
- 1863 – 15 December: Jules Anspach is appointed mayor by royal decree.
- 1864
  - The Avenue Louise and Bois de la Cambre are annexed from Ixelles by the City of Brussels.
  - The first Luizenmolen is built.
  - 26 September: Nadar launches the hot air balloon Le Géant from the Botanical Garden. To ensure the crowd's safety, Jules Anspach erects mobile barriers, thereby inventing crowd control barriers.
  - 3 October: The Isabelle Gatti de Gamond Royal Atheneum is established as the first non-denominational educational institution for girls in Belgium.
- 1865
  - St. Mary's Market is constructed by Gustave Hansotte.
  - 17 December: King Leopold II takes the constitutional oath at the Palace of the Nation.
- 1866 – Population: 157,905 city.

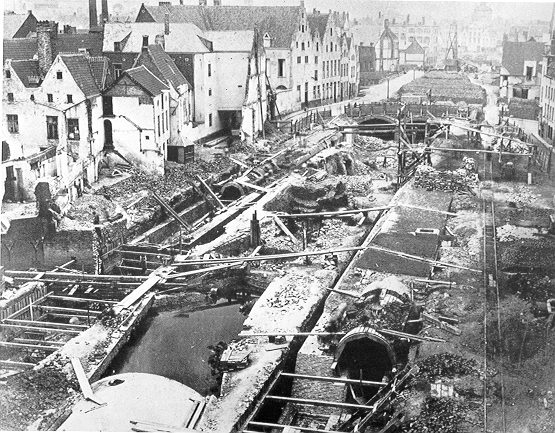
Covering of the Senne in Brussels, c. 1867–1871

- 1867
  - The covering of the Senne begins.
  - The Legend of Thyl Ulenspiegel and Lamme Goedzak is published by Charles De Coster.
  - The Grand Serment royal et de Saint-Georges des Arbalétriers de Bruxelles is established as a continuation of the Grand Serment des Arbalétriers de Bruxelles and Serment de Saint-Georges schutterijen.
  - Witlof is sold for the first time in a market, likely the New Market at the steps of the Congress Column, after being created by Frans Bresiers.
- 1868
  - The Antoine Wiertz Museum opens.
  - 1 March: The Société Libre des Beaux-Arts is established.
  - 6–15 September: The Brussels Congress is held.
- 1869 – 1 May: Trams begin operating in the city, running along the Avenue Louise between the Bois de la Cambre and the Namur Gate.
- 1870
  - The J. Petermann fondeur Bruxelles foundry is established on the Rue Emile Féron/Emile Féronstraat.
  - August–September: Around 35,000 French refugees from the Franco-Prussian War arrived at the South Station, with many settling permanently.

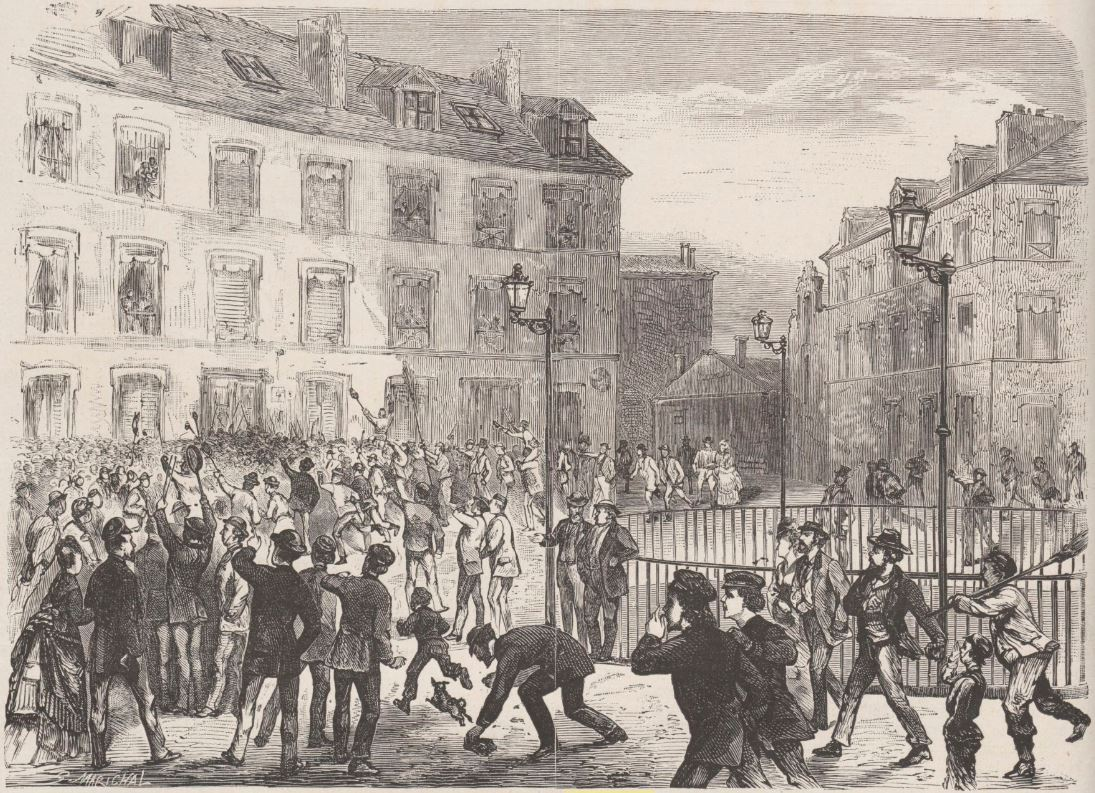
Riot at Victor Hugo's house on the Place des Barricades/Barricadenplein, 27–28 May 1871

- 1871
  - The covering of the Senne is completed; the Central Boulevards are laid out.
  - The Bank of Brussels is established.
  - The Halle Gate is renovated in the neo-Gothic style.
  - 27–28 May: A protest erupts at Victor Hugo's house on the Place des Barricades/Barricadenplein after he writes an open letter denouncing the Belgian Government for fearing the arrival of Paris Communards. A week later, he is expelled from the country.
- 1872 – The Church of Our Lady of Laeken is consecrated.

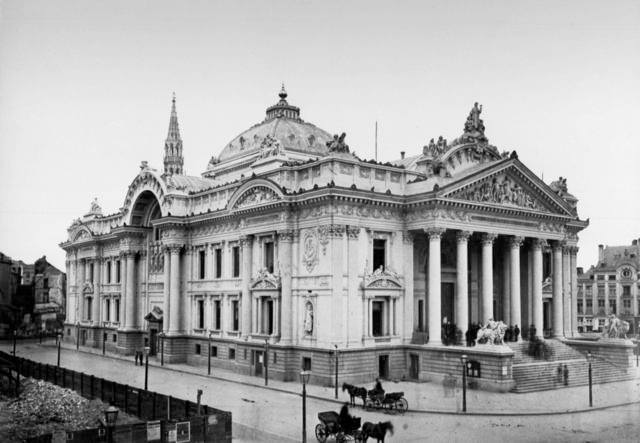
The Bourse Palace shortly after completion, 1873

- 1873
  - The Bourse Palace is completed.
  - The daily Old Market on the Place du Jeu de Balle/Vossenplein is established.
  - The Concert Noble opens in the Leopold Quarter.
  - 10 July: In a drunken rage, Paul Verlaine shoots Arthur Rimbaud, wounding him in the left wrist with a revolver he had purchased earlier that day.

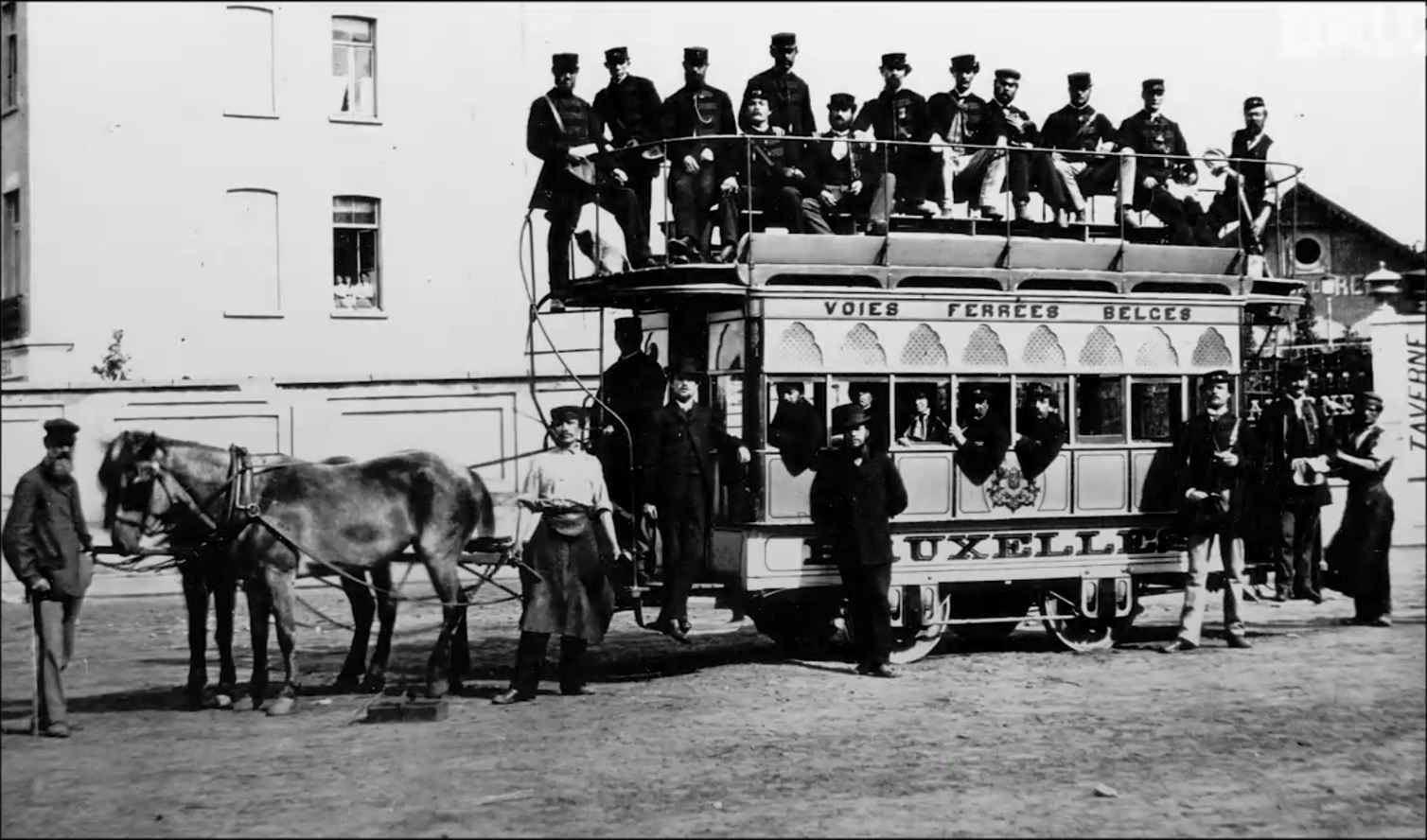
The first type of horse-drawn tram in Brussels, 1874

- 1874
  - The Royal Greenhouses of Laeken begin construction.
  - Brussels Cemetery is laid out.
  - The Ateliers Mommen are established by the ébéniste Félix Mommen, becoming the oldest art commune in the city.
  - 2 May: The first Conference of Mayors is held.
  - 27 July–27 August: The Brussels Conference, aimed at adopting an international agreement on the laws and customs of war, is held.
  - 23 December: Les Tramways Bruxellois is formed.
- 1875
  - The Panopticum de Maurice Castan opens on the Place de la Monnaie/Muntplein.
  - A normal school begins offering instruction after 10 years of efforts by the Ligue de l'Enseignement.
- 1876
  - The Noirauds children's charity is founded by Jean Bosquet and friends.
  - The Brussels Zoo closes after going bankrupt and returns the land to the city, which transforms it into Leopold Park.
  - 24 January: The city holds an architectural competition to boost development on newly available plots along the central avenues created over the Senne.
  - 12 September: The Brussels Geographic Conference is held.
- 1877
  - The Anderlecht Municipal Hall is built.
  - Ixelles Cemetery is created.
  - 6 May: The Musical Instruments Museum opens.
- 1878
  - 12 January: The Cirque Royal/Koninklijk Circus opens.
  - 20 September: The Great Synagogue of Brussels is consecrated.
  - 25 November: The Committee for Studies of the Upper Congo is founded on behalf of King Leopold II.
- 1879 – 20 May: Felix Vanderstraeten is appointed mayor by royal decree.

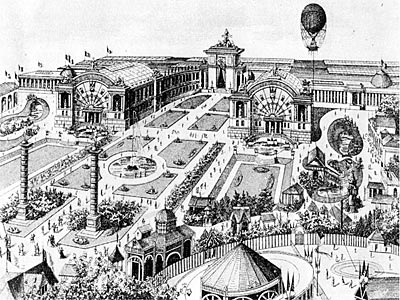
Inauguration of the Parc du Cinquantenaire/Jubelpark at the 1880 National Exhibition

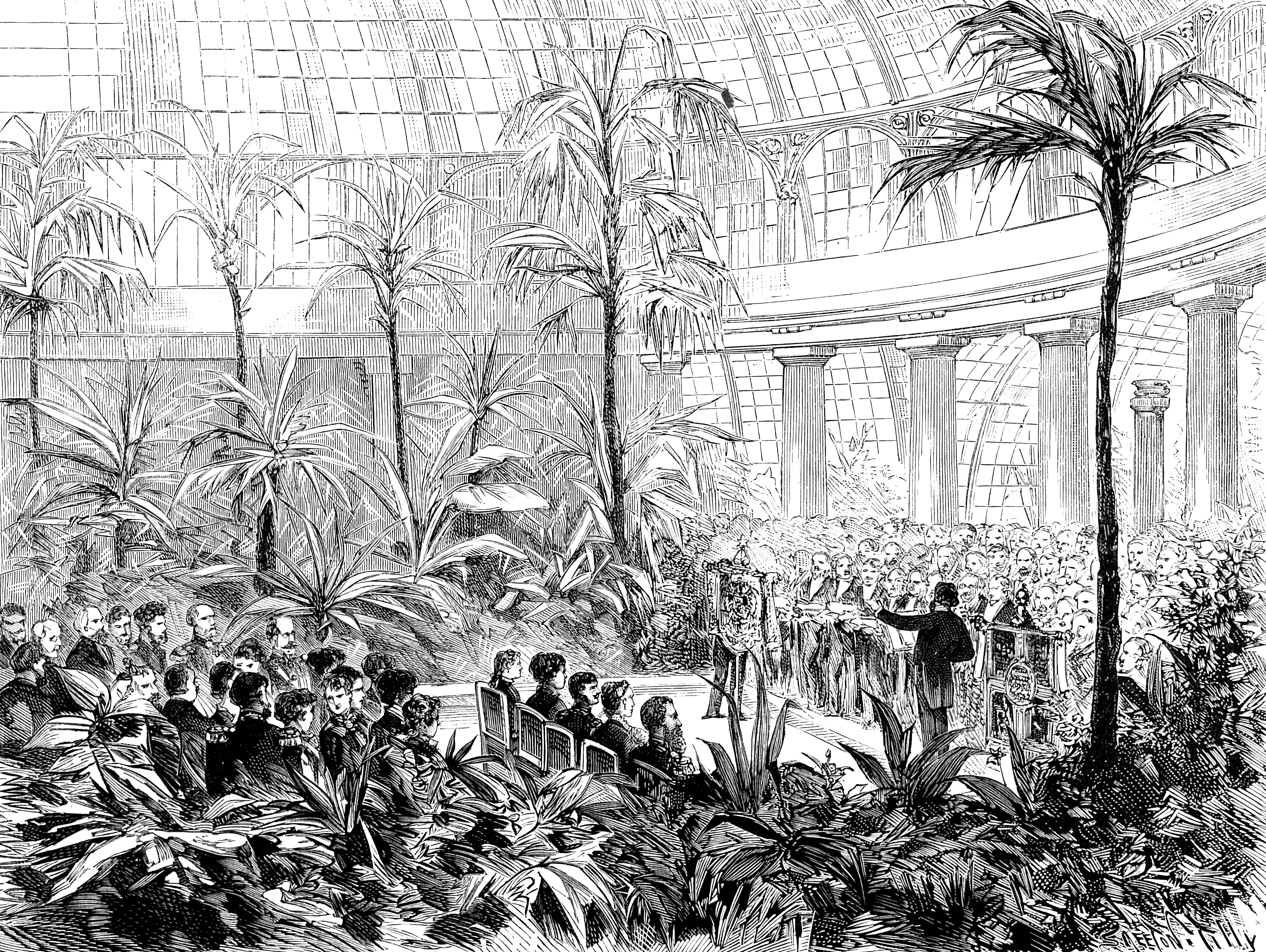
Engagement of Rudolf of Austria and Princess Stéphanie in the Royal Greenhouses of Laeken, 20 May 1880

- 1880
  - A National Exhibition is held to commemorate the 50th anniversary of Belgian independence; the Parc du Cinquantenaire/Jubelpark is laid out.
  - The White slave trade affair scandal is exposed and attracts international attention.
  - The Midi Fair begins.
  - The Hippodrome of Boitsfort opens in the Sonian Forest.
- 1881
  - L'Echo newspaper begins its publication.
  - 17 December: Charles Buls is appointed mayor by royal decree.
- 1882 – 7 January: The accountant Guillaume Bernays is killed by Léon Peltzer on behalf of his brother Armand Peltzer at 159, rue de la Loi/Wetstraat.
- 1883
  - 15 October: The Palace of Justice of Brussels is inaugurated.
  - 28 October: Les XX artistic society is founded by Octave Maus.
- 1884 – 7 September: 80,000 Catholics gather in support of the Law Jacobs. Local residents disperse them by dumping sacks of laundry bluing.
- 1885
  - Population: 171,751 city.
  - The Beursschouwburg opens as the Brasserie flamande.
  - 15 June: Saint-Gilles Prison opens.
- 1886
  - The city is linked by telephone to Paris.
  - Le Cirio café is established on the Rue de la Bourse/Beursstraat by Francesco Cirio.
- 1887
  - Le Soir newspaper begins its publication.
  - The Palace for Fine Arts is built.
  - The Brussels City Museum opens in the King's House.
  - The Schaerbeek Municipal Hall is built.
  - 16 June: The Société d'Archéologie de Bruxelles is established.
  - 1 October: The Brussels Arsenal reopens as the Royal Flemish Theatre.
- 1888
  - Het Laatste Nieuws newspaper begins its publication.
  - 24 November: The first Saint Verhaegen takes place as a student protest against a reorganisation of the Free University.
- 1889
  - The Molenbeek-Saint-Jean Municipal Hall is built.
  - 18 November: The Brussels Anti-Slavery Conference begins.
- 1890
  - The Square du Petit Sablon/Kleine Zavelsquare is laid out.
  - 18 January–23 February: Vincent van Gogh exhibits at the Les XX exhibition, where Anna Boch purchases his only painting sold during his lifetime, The Red Vineyards near Arles.
  - 2 July: The Brussels Conference Act of 1890 is signed.
  - 24 August: The Abattoirs of Anderlecht enter service as a central abattoir for the city.
- 1891
  - Buffalo Bill's Wild West Show takes place.
  - August: The International Socialist Labor Congress is held in the city.
  - 29 September: Mother Vandenputte is born in Saint-Josse-ten-Noode.
  - 12 December: The Compagnie intercommunale des eaux de l'Agglomération bruxelloise (CIE) is established.
- 1892
  - La Paix restaurant is established.
  - 4 August: Electricity is introduced through a city council act, with a concession granted to the India Rubber, Gutta Percha and Telegraph Works Company to establish an electrical works.
  - 23 November–17 December: The fourth International Monetary Conference is held in the city.
  - 27 November: The Belgian League for the Rights of Women is established by Marie Popelin and her lawyer Louis Frank.

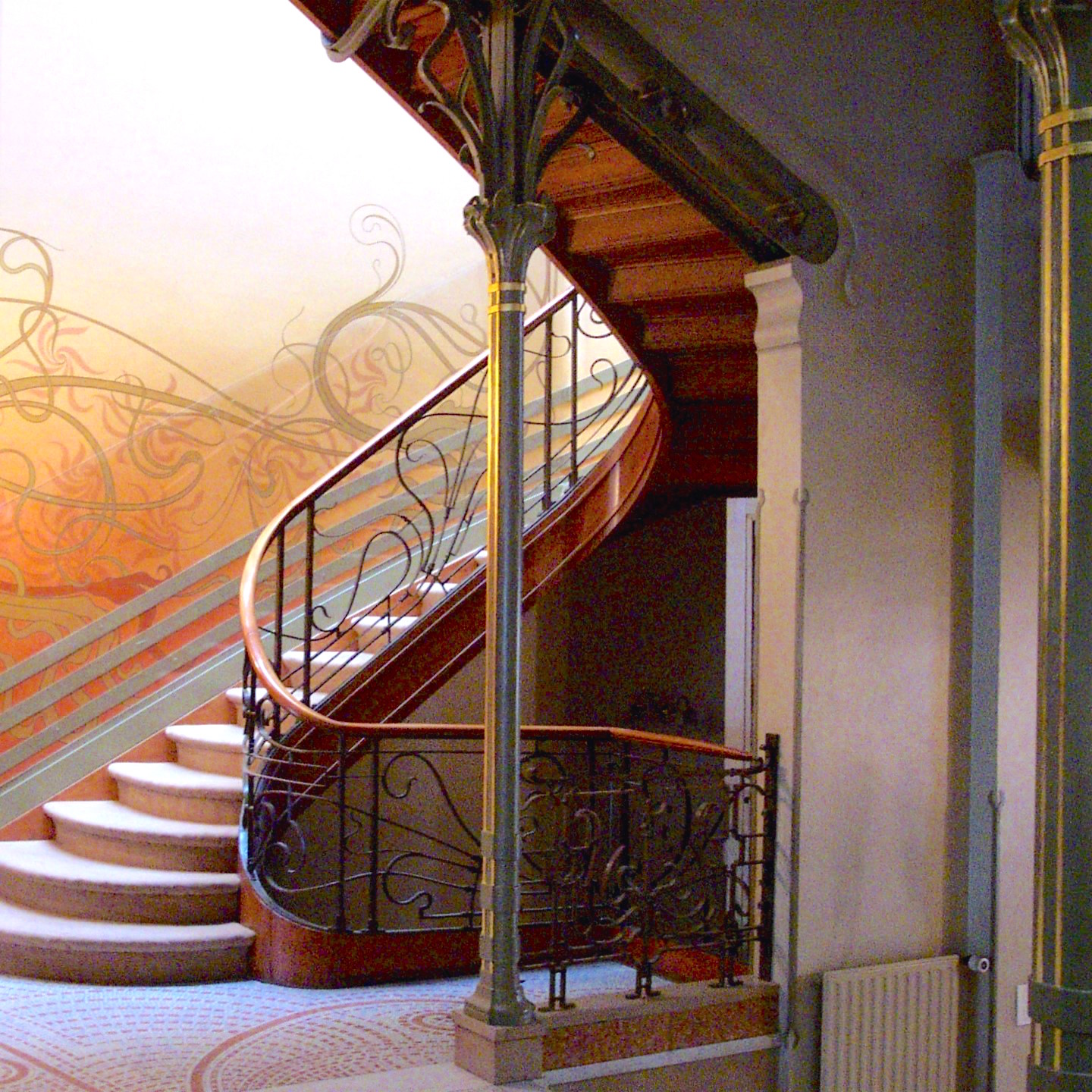
The Hôtel Tassel by Victor Horta, built in 1893, a UNESCO World Heritage Site

- 1892–1893: The first power plant in the city is constructed by the India Rubber, Gutta Percha and Telegraph Works Company on the Place Sainte-Catherine/Sint-Katelijneplein.
- 1893
  - The Paris–Brussels cycle race begins.
  - The Hôtel Tassel is built.
  - The Hankar House is built.
  - The Autrique House is built.
  - Chez Léon is established, laying the basis for the French restaurant chain Léon de Bruxelles.
  - 11–18 April: The Belgian general strike of 1893 is called after politicians of Catholic and Liberal parties joined to block a proposal to expand the suffrage.
  - 29 October: La Libre Esthétique artistic society is founded by Octave Maus as a successor of Les XX.
- 1894
  - The Société Belge d'Études Coloniales is headquartered in the city.
  - 8 January: The International Colonial Institute is established.
  - 4 February: The first Scharnaval is held.
  - 25 October: The New University of Brussels is established after Élisée Reclus was barred from teaching for political reasons, prompting liberal and socialist faculty members from the Free University to plan an independent institution.

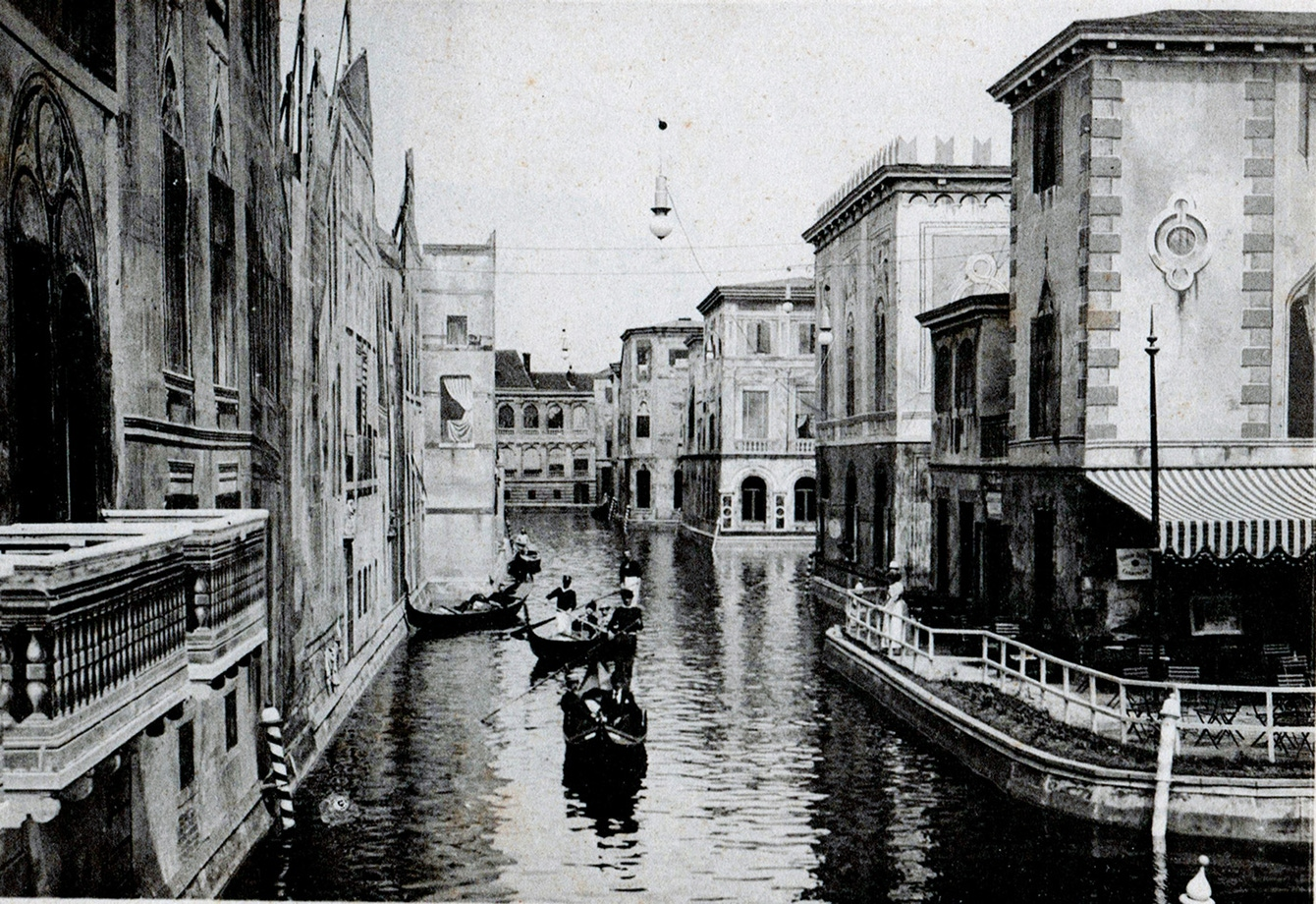
Venise à Bruxelles at Tour & Taxis, 1895–96

- 1895
  - The Hotel Métropole opens at the Place de Brouckère/De Brouckèreplein.
  - May–November: Venise à Bruxelles takes place with a partial replica of Venice built at Tour & Taxis.
- 1896
  - The King's House is rebuilt in the neo-Gothic style.
  - The Villa Bloemenwerf is built.
  - 1 March: The first public showing of moving pictures takes place in the Royal Saint-Hubert Galleries.

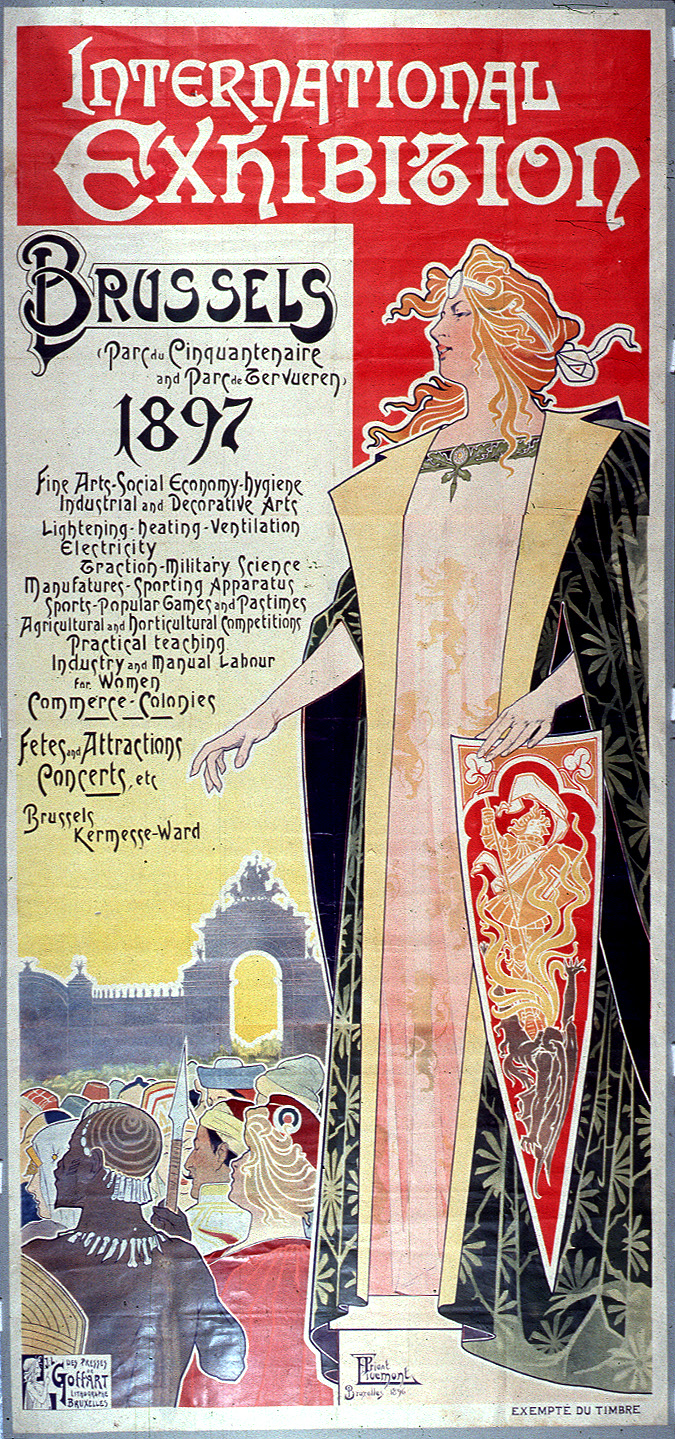
Poster of the Brussels International Exposition of 1897 by Henri Privat-Livemont

- 1897
  - The Avenue de Tervueren/Tervurenlaan is laid out.
  - The Oriental Pavilion is built.
  - May: The Sucreries Raffineries Bulgares is established.
  - 10 May–8 November: The Brussels International world's fair is held.
  - 1 November: Royale Union Saint-Gilloise is founded.
  - 16 December: Emile De Mot is appointed mayor by royal decree.
- 1898 – The Saint Roch Quarter is demolished.
- 1899
  - 2 April: The Maison du Peuple/Volkshuis is opened by the Belgian Labour Party.
  - 28–29 June: The June Riots erupt, after a Catholic proposal to rewrite the electoral law in their favour leads to tumultuous parliamentary debates.
  - 1 October: The Pavilion of Human Passions is inaugurated.
- 1900
  - Population: 183,686 city.
  - The Cantillon brewery is founded.
  - New Saint John Clinic is built.
  - 4 April: Edward, Prince of Wales, is shot at by Jean-Baptiste Sipido at Brussels-North railway station.
  - 25 April: Paul Panda Farnana comes to the city from the Congo Free State to receive an education.

== See also ==
- Timeline of Brussels
- History of Brussels

== Bibliography ==
- De Roose, Fabien (1999). De fonteinen van Brussel (in Dutch). Tielt: Lannoo. ISBN 978-90-209-3838-8.
- De Vries, André (2003). Brussels: A Cultural and Literary History. Oxford: Signal Books. ISBN 978-1-902669-46-5.
