= Scharnaval =

Biennial carnival in Schaerbeek, Belgium

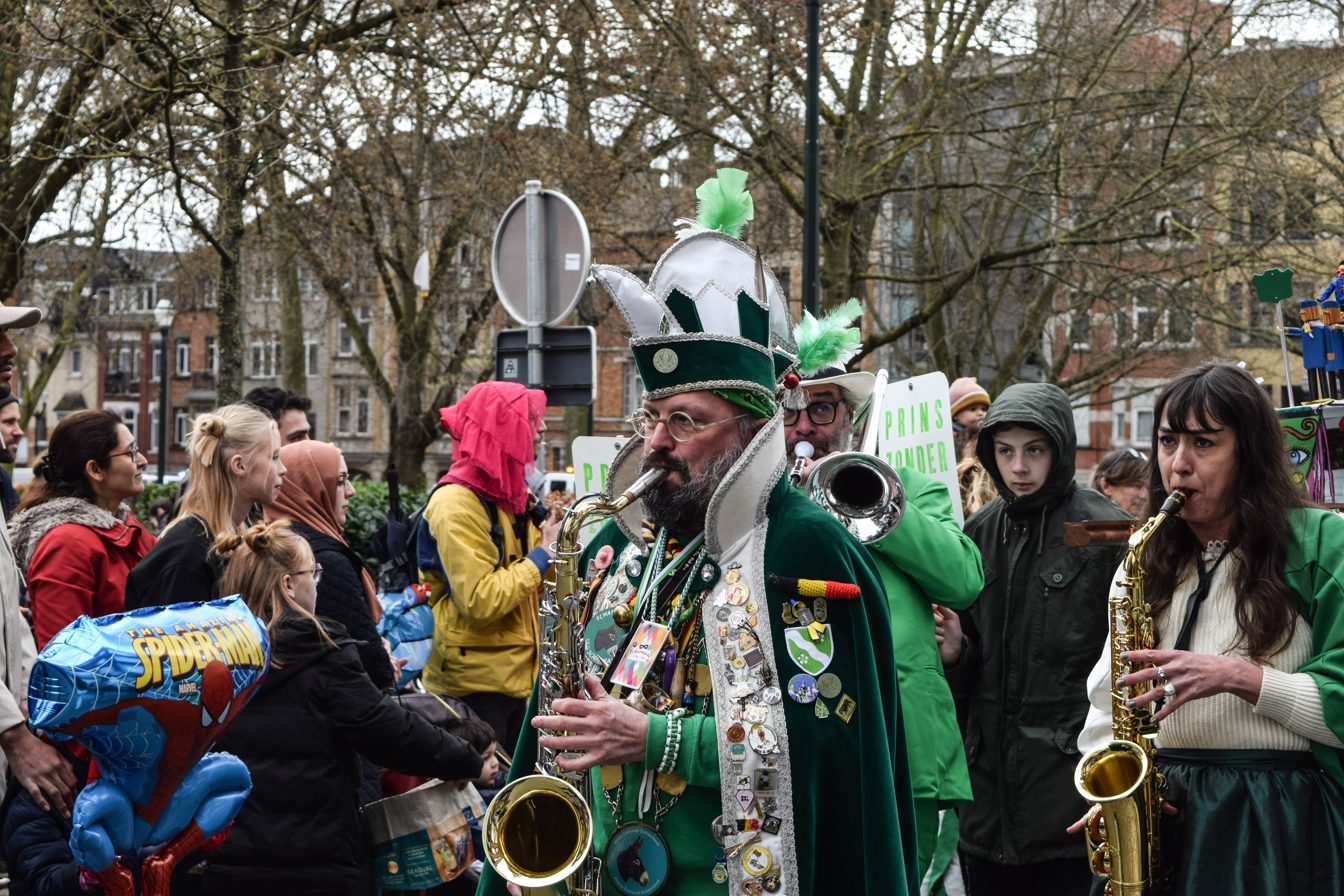
- Prince Zonder Carnaval & De Gilde in 2021.
- Status: Active
- Genre: Carnival
- Frequency: Biennial
- Locations: Schaerbeek, Brussels-Capital Region
- Country: Belgium
- Inaugurated: 1894
- Previous event: 16 March 2024
- Next event: 21 March 2026
- Website: scharnaval.be

The Scharnaval also known as the Carnival of Schaerbeek (French: Carnaval de Schaerbeek; Dutch: Carnaval van Schaarbeek), is an biennial carnival held in Schaerbeek, a municipality of Brussels, Belgium. Its origins date back to the late 19th century, when the event developed alongside the kermesse and charitable processions organised by community groups. The carnival was interrupted during the First and Second World Wars and again during the COVID-19 pandemic. Since its revival in 1998, the festival has included a procession of floats, folklore groups, and costumed participants, as well as the election of a Prince or Princess of Carnival.

== History ==
The origins of public festivities in Schaerbeek are closely linked to the kermesse, which developed in connection with a pilgrimage to the St. Catherine and St. Cornelius Church in Diegem, approximately five kilometres from the municipality. As was common in the nineteenth century, the pilgrimage was accompanied by a kermesse. Some kermesse operators remained in Schaerbeek while awaiting the opening of spring markets elsewhere, settling mainly around Place Colignon/Colignonplein and the St. Servatius Church. Their presence contributed to local commercial activity.

By the late nineteenth century, certain kermesse operators no longer travelled to Diegem, and Schaerbeek became an intermediate destination for pilgrims. In Kermesses (1884), writer Georges Eekhoud described the passage of pilgrims from Brussels to Schaerbeek, noting that many participants limited their journey to the local kermesse near the newly built church. During this period, the Colignon district, then still relatively sparsely built up, hosted attractions such as horse-driven carousels and food stalls, and each April the kermesse lasted for approximately three weeks.

The Schaerbeek kermesse became increasingly associated with a carnival procession traditionally held at the end of March. The first carnival parade was organised in 1894 by the Comité de la Presse Schaerbeekoise in support of charitable causes. On March 10, 1902, local traders founded the Cercle des Intérêts Matériels de la place Colignon, renamed in 1903 to Cercle place Colignon-Attractions, to promote local commerce. The association organised an annual procession bringing together local businesses and raising funds for charitable initiatives such as Le bon lait pour les petits (transl. The right milk for little ones).

As urbanisation increased towards the end of the nineteenth century, the kermesse gradually lost its connection with Diegem and became a distinct local event. Complaints from residents concerning noise and hygiene led municipal authorities to consider relocating the kermesse to other areas, including Rue Rue Général Eenens/Generaal Eenensstraat and Rue Metsys/Metsysstraat. The attractions were temporarily moved to the Chaussée de Haecht/Haachtsesteenweg before returning in the early twentieth century to the area around the town hall and Place Lehon/Lehonplein.

In April 1911, kermesse stalls were installed while the town hall was damaged by an act of arson, causing significant losses for several operators. The First World War brought the kermesse and carnival procession to a halt, with both resuming after the conflict. In 1921, the carnival procession was revived under the initiative of municipal councillor Léopold Cromps and placed under the patronage of burgomaster Jean-Baptiste Meiser. During the interwar period, several municipal councillors served as honorary presidents of the association.

From the 1930s onwards, the kermesse expanded geographically, extending from Avenue Voltaire/Voltairelaan to Place de la Reine/Koninginneplein and along Rue Royale Sainte-Marie/Koninklijke Sinte-Mariastraat. Additional locations were incorporated in 1938, including Place de Helmet/Helmetplein and Place Dailly/Daillyplein, followed in the 1950s by the area around the Holy Family Church, which continue to host the annual kermesse. The Second World War again interrupted both the kermesse and the carnival procession, which resumed in 1946 with participation from groups and companies across Belgium. The organising association ceased its activities in 1978, leading to the discontinuation of the carnival.

In 1998, the municipal authorities relaunched the carnival under the name Scharnaval by establishing a dedicated procession committee. The revived event, presented as the 69th edition, took place on 28 March 1998 and involved more than 1,000 participants. In the years that followed, Scharnaval was held annually and accompanied by a historical exhibition at the town hall and the election of a Prince or Princess of Carnival, who traditionally led the procession alongside members of the municipal executive.

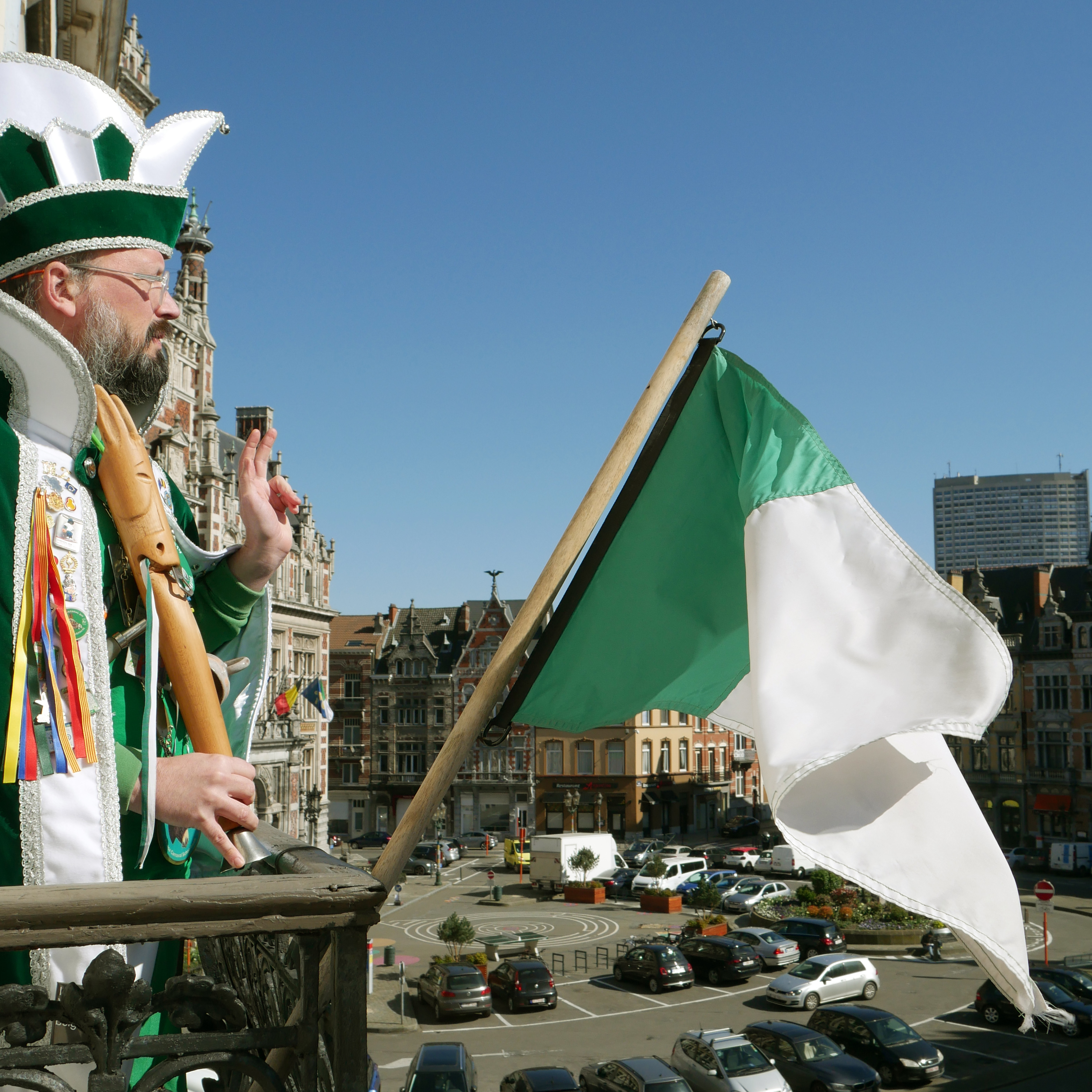
Prins Zonder Carnaval seen from the Schaerbeek Municipal Hall in 2020.

In 2020, McCloud Zicmuse was elected Prince Carnival shortly before the scheduled edition of Scharnaval. Two days later, public health measures introduced in response to the COVID-19 pandemic led to the cancellation of the carnival procession. Leading to Zicmuse to call himself Prins Zonder Carnaval. The event was subsequently cancelled again in 2021 and 2022 due to continued restrictions. During this period, Zicmuse retained the title of Prince Carnival despite the absence of a parade and continued to fulfil a representative role associated with the position, leading him to refer to himself as "Prins Zonder Carnaval" (transl. Prince Without Carnival).

Following the lifting of pandemic-related restrictions, the carnival did not immediately resume. In 2023, the municipality announced that Scharnaval would not take place, citing a policy decision to alternate major public events, including the carnival and the local light festival, as well as financial considerations. As a result, the interruption of the carnival extended beyond the pandemic period.

The carnival returned on 16 March 2024 after a five-year hiatus. The procession included ten groups, three floats, and a one-kilometre route, running from Rue Van Ysendyck/Van Ysendyckstraat to Helmet. No new Prince Carnaval was elected; the 2020 winner, McCloud Zicmuse, retained the title of "Prins Zonder Carnaval." The event attracted local residents and visitors, although participation and the scale of the procession were smaller than in previous years.

== Prince(ss) Carnival ==
Since 1999, Schaarbeek has elected a Prince or Princess of Carnival each year. Candidates compete in quizzes on the history of Schaarbeek and folkloric challenges, such as blind beer tastings. The winner receives the keys to the city, and leads the main carnival procession for one year, wearing a green-and-white costume with a wooden marotte featuring a donkey’s head. Since 2016, a Junior Prince or Princess is also chosen.
