= Maurice Van Meenen =

Belgian politician (1848–1909)

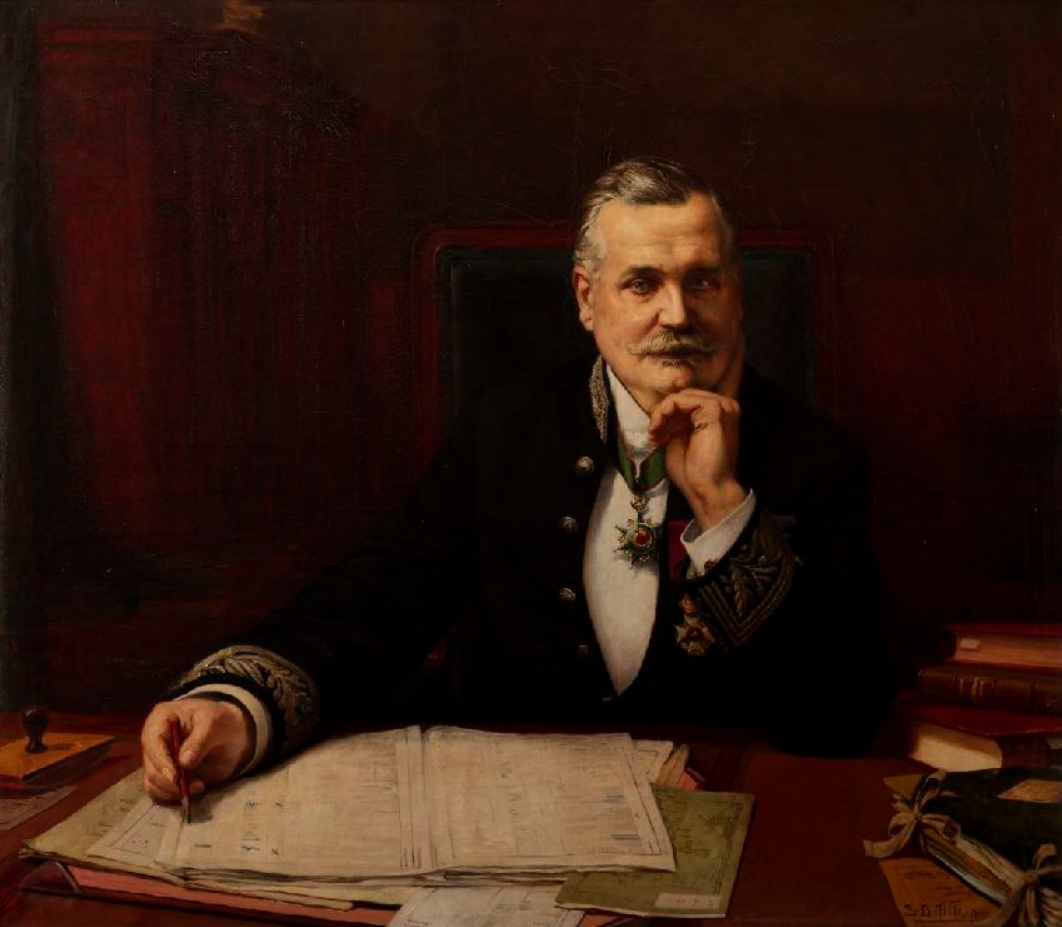
Posthumous portrait of Maurice Van Meenen by Servais Detilleux

Maurice Van Meenen (1848 – 2 August 1909) was a Belgian politician and mayor of the Brussels municipality of Saint-Gilles.

== Biography ==
Maurice Van Meenen was a lawyer by training and a liberal politician. He was elected municipal councillor in Saint-Gilles in 1879; the municipality is today one of the 19 municipalities of the Brussels-Capital Region. From 1881 to 1893, and again between 1896 and 1900, he was alderman for public education in the municipality. He was mayor between 1893 and 1896, and again from 1900 until his death in 1909. He played an important role in the development of the municipality during the late 19th century, and was the driving force behind the construction of the new, imposing Saint-Gilles Town Hall. The square in front of the town hall is named after him.
