= Saint-Gilles Municipal Hall =

Municipal hall building in Saint-Gilles, Belgium

- Hôtel communal de Saint-Gilles (French); Gemeentehuis van Sint-Gillis (Dutch)
- Saint-Gilles' Municipal Hall
- Interactive map of the Saint-Gilles Municipal Hall area

General information
- Type: Municipal hall
- Location: Place Maurice Van Meenen / Maurice Van Meenenplein 39, 1060 Saint-Gilles, Brussels-Capital Region, Belgium
- Coordinates: 50°49′28″N 4°20′45″E
- Construction started: 1900
- Completed: 1904

Design and construction
- Architect: Albert Dumont

The Municipal Hall (French: Hôtel communal; Dutch: Gemeentehuis) of Saint-Gilles is the municipal hall building and the seat of that municipality of Brussels, Belgium. Designed by the architect Albert Dumont in neo-Flemish Renaissance style and completed in 1904. Mayor Maurice Van Meenen, after whom the square in front of the building is named, was instrumental in bringing about its construction. It is located at 39, place Maurice Van Meenen/Maurice Van Meenenplein.

== See also ==
- Anderlecht Municipal Hall
- Brussels Town Hall
- Forest Municipal Hall
- Molenbeek-Saint-Jean Municipal Hall
- Schaerbeek Municipal Hall
