= Armand Peltzer =

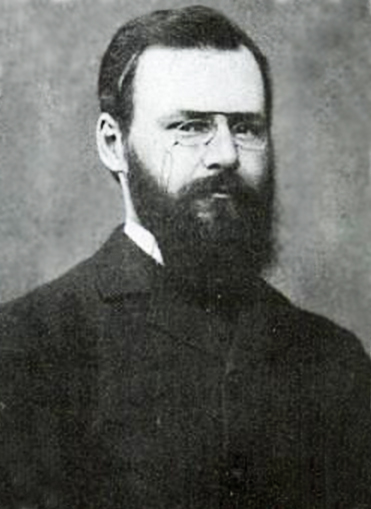
Armand Peltzer

Armand Peltzer (8 May 1849 – 10 October 1885) was a Belgian criminal, notable as a protagonist of the 1882 Peltzer Case, in which he was tried for having his brother Léon Peltzer murder the Antwerp lawyer Guillaume Bernays due to his love affair with Bernays' wife Julie Pecher.

== Life ==
His parents were Hermann Peltzer from Elberfeld, Prussia and his wife Ida Ida (née von Gülich) from Osnabruck, Hanover The couple had settled in Verviers, where Armand was born, the eldest of six children - the others were Adèle (1844-1924), Léon (1847-1922), James (1850-), Alice and Robert. On 17 May 1869 Armand himself married Maria Charlotta Bocking (16 May 1847 - 28 March 1870), also born in Verviers and on 13 March the following year in Verviers she gave birth to their first child Marguerite, known as Mariette. 15 days after the child's birth Maria Charlotta died of complications, leaving Armand an inconsolable widower focussed only on Mariette.

=== Peltzer Case ===
Armand and his brothers James and Léon were well known in Antwerp society. Armand had become an engineer with business interests in Buenos Aires, whilst the other brothers were successful in the import-export trade. James and Léon were thus invited to Julie Pecher's wedding to Guillaume Bernays, a maritime lawyer, on 26 December 1872. Armand was busy on business in Buenos Aires and could not attend. In 1873, with their business worsening, James and Léon were threatened with bankruptcy through fraud. Their father had died, effectively leaving the eldest brother Armand as head of the family, and so he sold his interests in Argentina, returned to Belgium to save his brothers from financial and social ruin and set up home in their elderly mother's house in Antwerp. He also took on legal services from Bernays, who was impressed by his honour, became his friend and invited him to his house.

Bernays was a busy man, having recently had a son Edouard (1874-1963). However, the birth was not easy and the couple's marriage collapsed, with Julie blaming her husband for absences on business and for an affair with a governess. Armand helped Julie through these difficulties, become at first her confident and eventually her lover. He thus began planning Bernays' murder to clear his way to Julie, but realised he could not avoid suspicion if he carried it out himself thanks to rumours already circulating about his affair with Julie. Armand and Léon thus invented the character "Henry Vaughan", with Léon contacting Bernays under that alias to take him on for an oceanographic project and arranging a meeting on 7 January 1882 at "Vaughan"'s own apartment at 159 rue de la Loi, recently rented for that purpose. There Léon shot Bernays in the back of the neck.

With press help, the investigation led to Armand and Léon and they were tried from 27 November to 22 December 1882, with Edmond Picard as Armand's defence counsel. They were both found guilty and condemned to death, but this was commuted to life imprisonment. Léon Peltzer recognised the justice of the verdict against himself but maintained that it was a miscarriage of justice for Armand to also receive it. Armand himself exclaimed "Let my little girl's curse fall on the jury", in reference to the impact on his daughter Mariette. He died in prison in Louvain three years after the sentence, whilst his brother remained in prison until 1911. Mariette went on to marry Hermann Adeneuer on 9 November 1889 and died in Berlin aged 72 on 3 December 1942. Julie was cleared of all suspicion, on 16 April 1886 marrying Fréderic Delvaux (1834-1916), who had represented her during the trial. She later became a journalist, dying in Antwerp on 11 May 1928.
