= Molenbeek-Saint-Jean Municipal Hall =

Municipal hall building in Molenbeek, Belgium

- Hôtel communal de Molenbeek-Saint-Jean (French); Gemeentehuis van Sint-Jans-Molenbeek (Dutch)
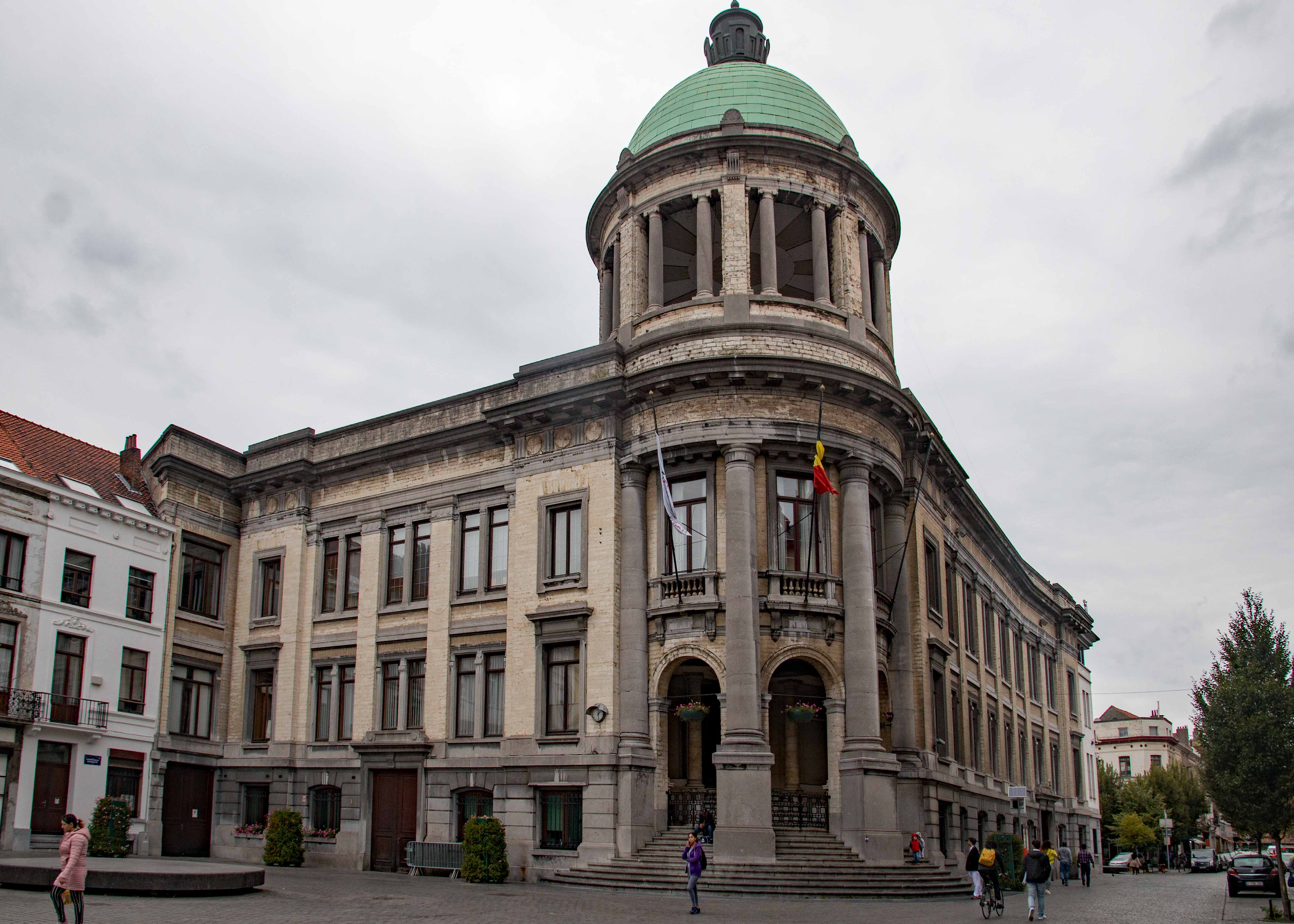
- Molenbeek's Municipal Hall

General information
- Type: Municipal hall
- Architectural style: Eclectic; Neoclassical
- Location: Rue du Comte de Flandre / Graaf van Vlaanderenstraat 20, 1080 Molenbeek-Saint-Jean, Brussels-Capital Region, Belgium
- Coordinates: 50°51′19″N 4°20′19″E
- Construction started: 1886
- Completed: 1889

Design and construction
- Architect: Jean-Baptiste Janssens

The Municipal Hall (French: Hôtel communal; Dutch: Gemeentehuis) of Molenbeek-Saint-Jean is the municipal hall building and the seat of that municipality of Brussels, Belgium. Designed by the architect Jean-Baptiste Janssens in an eclectic style of Greco-Roman and Renaissance inspiration and completed in 1889, it is located at 20, rue du Comte de Flandre/Graaf van Vlaanderenstraat.

== History ==
=== Prado building ===
In the 19th century, the Municipal Hall of Molenbeek-Saint-Jean was located in a house at 23, chaussée de Merchtem/Merchtemsesteenweg, on the site of the current Bonnevie Park. As the population grew, the municipal authorities started looking for a larger building. After a failed plan from 1847 by the architect Frédéric Van der Rit, which involved relocating the Municipal Hall to the Chaussée de Ninove/Ninoofsesteenweg, on the Place de la Duchesse de Brabant/Hertogin van Brabantplein, it was decided to move the premises to the former Prado theatre, on the site of the current Municipal Hall.

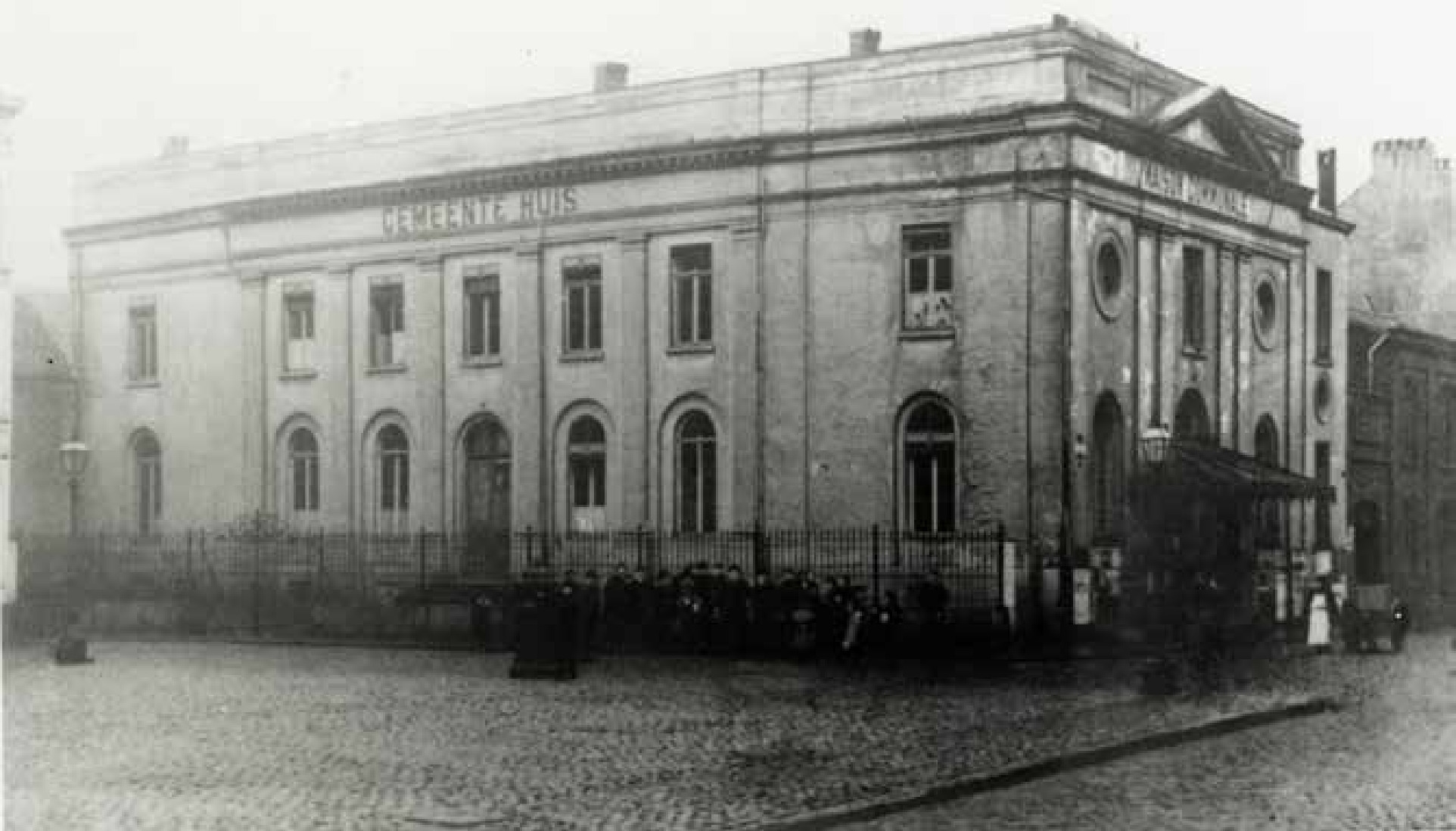
The former Municipal Hall, the Prado, in the 19th century

The building's original plan not only consisted of the Municipal Hall; it also included a police station, a caretaker's lodge, a guardhouse, a prison, a room for the mayor and aldermen, a secretariat, a civil registry office, a collector's office, a council chamber and an office for the Justice de Paix.

=== Current Municipal Hall ===
By the 1880s, the building had seen its best days and was in poor condition. On 4 October 1886, the demolition of the Prado building was approved to make way for the current Municipal Hall. The then-mayor Henri Hollevoet appointed Jean-Baptiste Janssen, a municipal official in charge of public works, as architect. The Municipal Hall was inaugurated on 28 September 1889 with a popular ball on the Place Communale/Gemeenteplein ("Municipal Square").

On 13 April 1995, the Municipal Hall was listed as protected immovable heritage by the Department of Monuments and Landscapes of the Brussels-Capital Region.

== Architecture ==
The Municipal Hall was built in a neoclassical eclectic style, which makes it one of the most austere municipal halls in Brussels. This was also the intention, as the building had to be sober but practical. The building stands on the site of the former Prado building, and to guarantee durability, concrete foundations were poured 4 metres (13 ft) deep. The works were carried out by local craftsmen, who took care of the structural work, glasswork, marble work, tiling, furniture and joinery. Moreover, the municipality only opted for companies where workers earned a minimum wage. It was an important political gesture illustrating the difficult situation of workers at that time.

== Interior ==
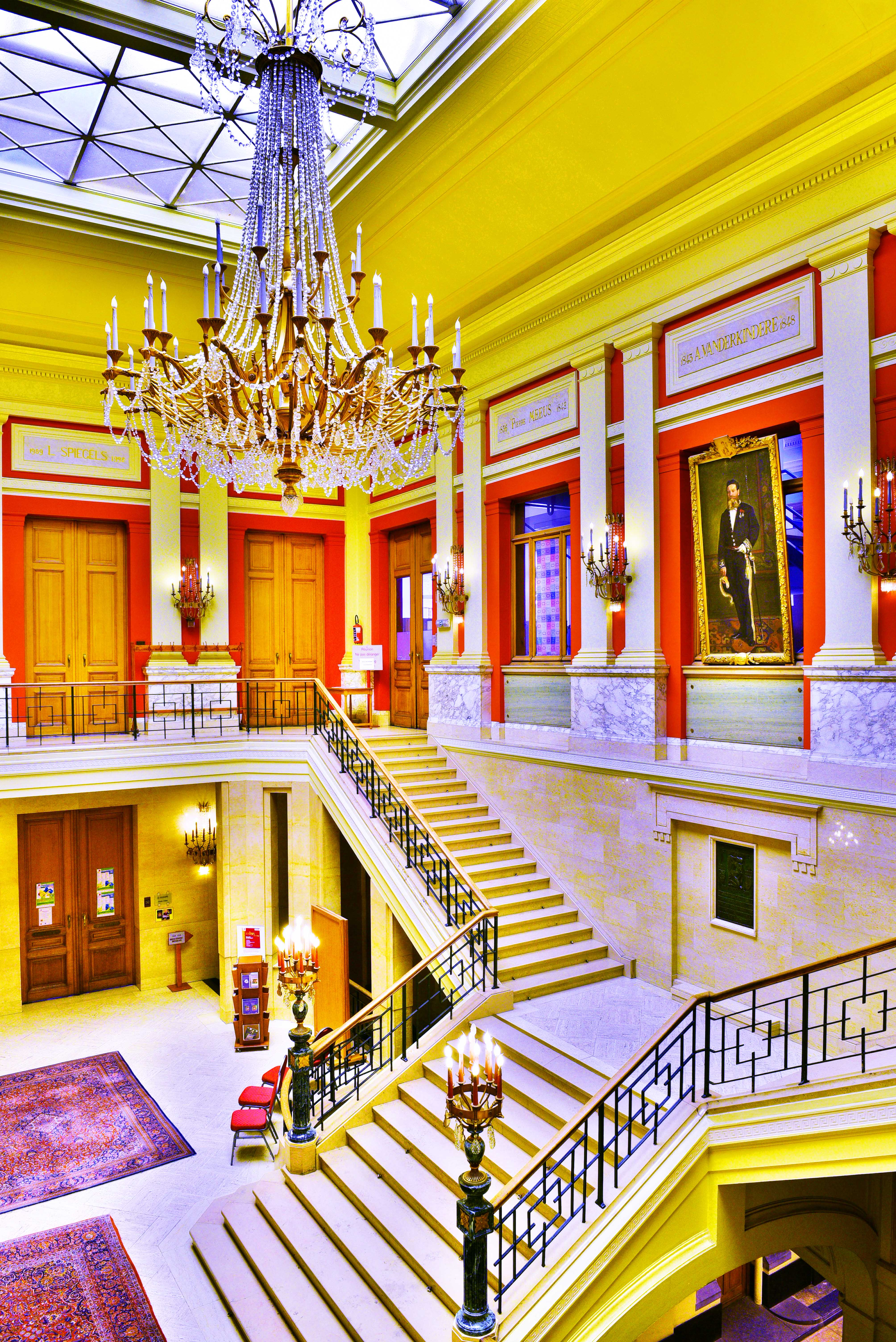
The main staircase

The entrance features four Tuscan marble columns. An impressive chandelier in bronze and crystal hangs in this room. The names of the mayors are engraved in the marble stones from the upper part of the walls. In the centre above the staircase of honour is a portrait of Henri Hollevoet, the mayor who inaugurated the Municipal Hall in 1889. The aldermen's offices, located on the first and second floors, have undergone various adaptations due in particular to the increase in aldermen over time. The mayor's office is majestic, located under the dome whose ceiling is lined with a allegorical painting by Amédée Lynen symbolising Education, Public assistance, Civil protection, Justice, Art and Letters and Marriage.

=== Works of art ===
The building holds major works of art by Pieter Bruegel the Elder, Anthony van Dyck, Jacob Jordaens, Léon Spilliaert, Eugène Laermans and Roger Somville, among others. The collection is the result of an acquisition policy initiated by the municipality in the 1960s, as well as a major donation from the art critic and novelist Sander Pierron, an illustrious local resident who died in 1945. The Pierron collection (450 works) is dominated by post-impressionist works (late 19th century–early 20th century) and realistic engravings from the first half of the 20th century. Donations from artists and municipal acquisitions have extended the collection to include works ranging from the 17th century to contemporary art.

== See also ==
- Anderlecht Municipal Hall
- Brussels Town Hall
- Forest Municipal Hall
- Saint-Gilles Municipal Hall
- Schaerbeek Municipal Hall
