= Anderlecht Municipal Hall =

Municipal hall building in Anderlecht, Belgium

- Hôtel communal d'Anderlecht (French); Gemeentehuis van Anderlecht (Dutch)
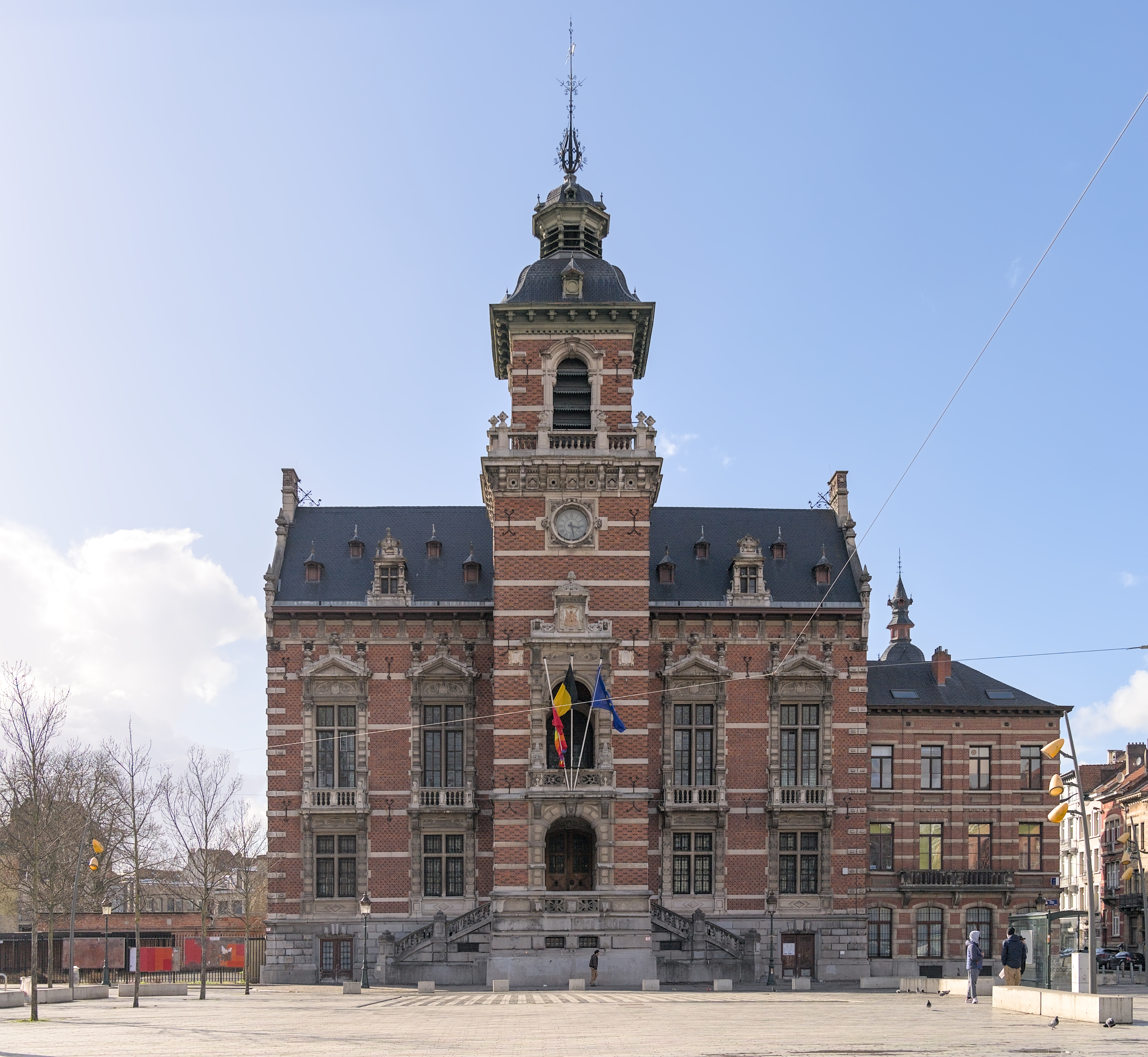
- Anderlecht's Municipal Hall

- Location within Brussels Location within Belgium

General information
- Type: Municipal hall
- Location: Place du Conseil / Raadsplein 1, 1070 Anderlecht, Brussels-Capital Region, Belgium
- Coordinates: 50°50′21″N 4°19′44″E
- Construction started: 1877
- Completed: 1879

Design and construction
- Architect: Jules-Jacques Van Ysendyck

The Municipal Hall (French: Hôtel communal; Dutch: Gemeentehuis) of Anderlecht is the municipal hall building and the seat of that municipality of Brussels, Belgium. Designed by the architect Jules-Jacques Van Ysendyck in neo-Flemish Renaissance style and completed in 1879, it is located at 1, place du Conseil/Raadsplein in Cureghem/Kuregem.

== See also ==
- Brussels Town Hall
- Forest Municipal Hall
- Molenbeek-Saint-Jean Municipal Hall
- Saint-Gilles Municipal Hall
- Schaerbeek Municipal Hall
