= Schaerbeek Municipal Hall =

Municipal hall building in Schaerbeek, Belgium

- Hôtel communal de Schaerbeek (French); Gemeentehuis van Schaarbeek (Dutch)
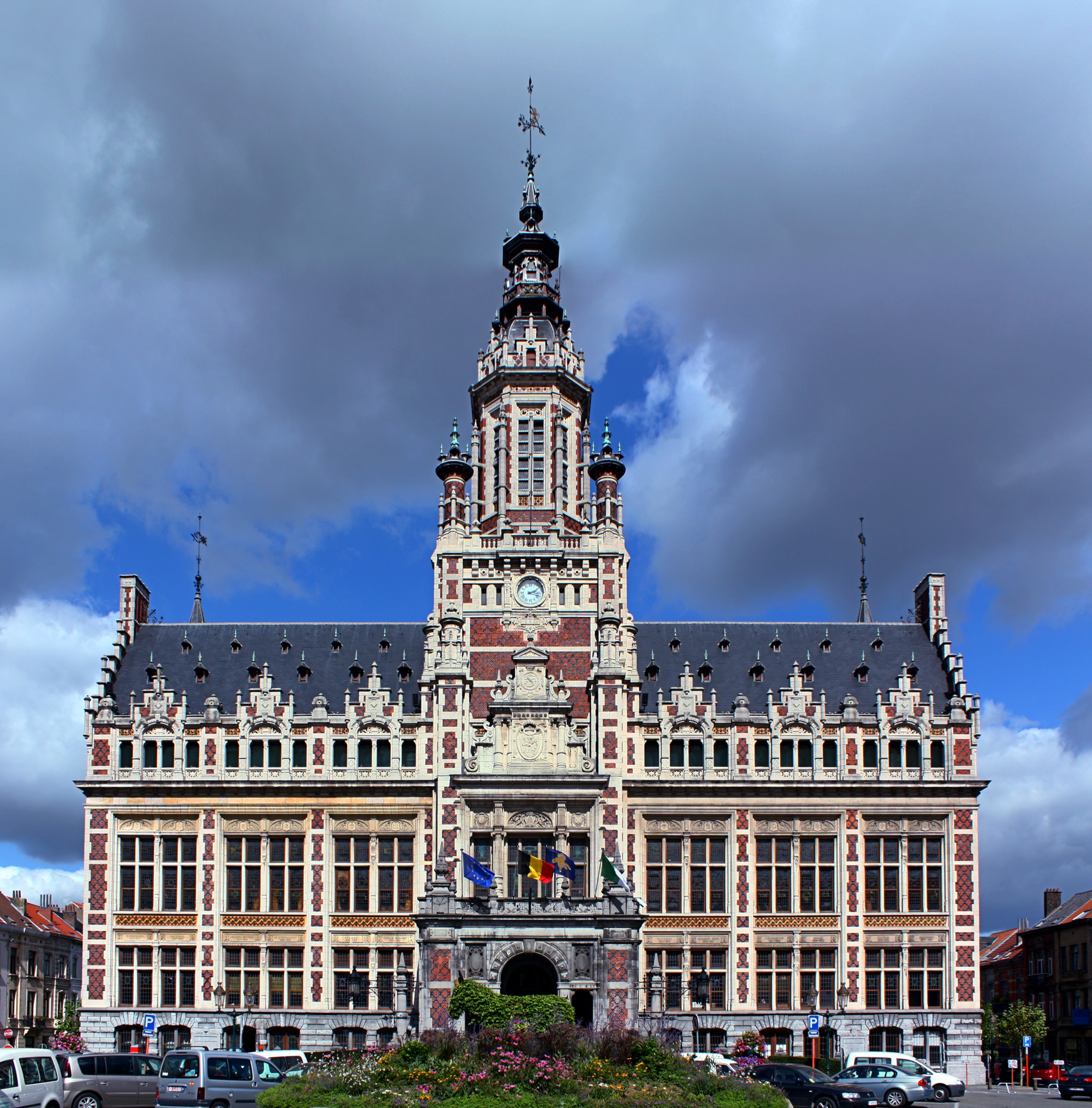
- Schaerbeek's Municipal Hall
- Interactive map of the Schaerbeek Municipal Hall area

General information
- Type: Municipal hall
- Location: Place Colignon / Colignonplein, 1030 Schaerbeek, Brussels-Capital Region, Belgium
- Coordinates: 50°52′3″N 4°22′25″E
- Construction started: 1884
- Completed: 1887 (rebuilt 1919)

Design and construction
- Architects: Jules-Jacques Van Ysendyck, Maurice Van Ysendyck

The Municipal Hall (French: Hôtel communal; Dutch: Gemeentehuis) of Schaerbeek is the municipal hall building and the seat of that municipality of Brussels, Belgium. Designed by the architect Jules-Jacques Van Ysendyck in neo-Flemish Renaissance style and completed in 1887, it is located at the centre of the Place Colignon/Colignonplein.

== History ==
The current Municipal Hall was designed by the architect Jules-Jacques Van Ysendyck in neo-Flemish Renaissance style. It is the municipality's fourth Municipal Hall; the first was located, from 1830–31, at the corner of the Chaussée de Haecht/Haachtsesteenweg and what is now the Avenue Louis Bertrand/Louis Bertrandlaan; the second, from 1851, at 28, rue Saint-Paul/Sint-Paulusstraat (now the Place de la Reine/Koninginneplein); and the third, from 1864, at 81, rue des Palais/Paleizenstraat. The first stone was officially laid on 15 March 1885 and the building was inaugurated on 21 July 1887 by King Leopold II.

On the night of 17 April 1911, the Municipal Hall was partially destroyed in a fire that was probably arson. The architect's son, Maurice Van Ysendyck, was charged with the reconstruction, which began in 1912 and lasted until 1915. On that occasion, the building was significantly enlarged at the rear by adding an extension in Italian neo-Gothic style to the U-shape, thus turning it into a quadrilateral. On 1 October 1915, the rebuilt Municipal Hall was reopened to the public. However, it was not officially inaugurated until after the First World War, in 1919, in the presence of King Albert I and Queen Elisabeth.

On 13 April 1995, the Municipal Hall was listed as protected immovable heritage by the Department of Monuments and Landscapes of the Brussels-Capital Region.

== See also ==
- Anderlecht Municipal Hall
- Brussels Town Hall
- Forest Municipal Hall
- Molenbeek-Saint-Jean Municipal Hall
- Saint-Gilles Municipal Hall
