= Les plus grands Belges =

Television program

Les plus grands Belges (French for "The Greatest Belgians",) is a television show that aired in 2005 on the Belgian French-speaking public channel RTBF. In the program the audience could vote for the greatest Belgian by using the website, sending an SMS or using the telephone. In total several hundred thousand votes were cast. Nominees needed to have lived between 50 BC and now, between the borders of present-day Belgium. This is because Belgium only gained its independence in 1830, while numerous historical individuals from, for example, the Spanish Netherlands, are considered to be "Belgians".

A separate vote "De Grootste Belg" by the Belgian Dutch-speaking public channel VRT was held around the same time, producing strikingly different results, such as both top-10s sharing only three personalities, namely Jacques Brel, Father Damien and Eddy Merckx. To some this illustrates the low significance of any national cultural identity that remains shared among the two predominant language communities of the country.

Because Father Damien holds the highest average ranking of the three shared personalities (third on this list and first on the Flemish list) it has been argued that he is the only one to be entitled to be called the "Greatest Belgian", as voted by all Belgians.

== Top 10 ==
Rank	Personality	Notability	Nomination defended by	Ref.
1	Jacques Brel	Singer, most famous for Ne Me Quitte Pas and Le Plat Pays. Celebrated for his passionate, satirical and acerbic songs. Internationally covered by many singers and admired for his free-spirited nature.	Serge Lama, singer.	
2	Baudouin of Belgium	King. Admired for his very personal concern for his country. Created the King Baudouin Foundation to improve the living conditions of the Belgian people.		
3	Father Damien	Priest and humanitarian. Went to help leprosy victims in Molokai. Beatified in 1995. Subsequently canonized as a saint in the Roman Catholic Church in 2009.	Guy Gilbert, priest, and Laurette Onkelinx, politician	
4	Eddy Merckx	Cyclist, often named the greatest in his sport. Won more than 525 individual races, including three world championships, five times the Tour de France and an hour record which stood for 28 years.	Rodrigo Beenkens, sports journalist.	
5	Soeur Emmanuelle	Nun and humanitarian activist. Helped the poor in Turkey and Egypt.	Joëlle Milquet, politician.	
6	José van Dam	Opera bass-baritone singer. Internationally celebrated and respected.	Gérard Corbiau, film director.	
7	Benoît Poelvoorde	Actor, comedian and film director. Co-director of the internationally lauded cult film Man Bites Dog.	Stefan Liberski, film script writer, comedian and TV presenter.	
8	Hergé	Comics artist. Creator of The Adventures of Tintin, one of the best-selling comics series worldwide.	Alain Berenboom, lawyer and novelist.	
9	René Magritte	Painter. Creator of Ceci n'est pas une pipe and one of the most iconic Surrealist artists of all time.	Marc Ysaye, rock musician and head of radio channel Classic 21.	
10	Georges Simenon	Novelist. Creator of Inspector Maigret, which made him one of the globally best-selling novelists of all time.		

== From 11 to 100 ==
11. Paul-Henri Spaak, Prime Minister (1938–1939) (1946) (1947–1949). President of the United Nations General Assembly (1946–1947), Secretary General of N.A.T.O. (1957–1961). President of the Common Assembly of the European Coal and Steel Community (1952–1954).
12. Albert I, king (1909–1934).
13. Leopold II, king (1865–1909).
14. Justine Henin, (born 1982) tennis player.
15. Ernest Solvay, (1838–1922) chemist, industrialist and philanthropist. Inventor of the ammonia-soda process.
16. Victor Horta, (1861–1947) architect and designer (Hôtel Tassel, Brussels-Central railway station, Centre for Fine Arts, Brussels).
17. Godfrey, Lord of Bouillon, knight, leader of the First Crusade and first ruler of the Kingdom of Jerusalem.
18. André Franquin, comics artist (Gaston Lagaffe and the Marsupilami. Also worked on Spirou and Fantasio).
19. Andreas Vesalius, (1514–1564) anatomist, physician, and author of one of the most influential books on human anatomy, On the Structure of the Human Body.
20. Adolphe Sax, (1814–1894) musical instrument designer and musician, best known for inventing the saxophone.
21. Peter Paul Rubens, painter (The Descent from the Cross).
22. Philippe Geluck, comics artist and cartoonist (Le Chat).
23. Zénobe Gramme, (1826–1901) inventor of the dynamo.
24. Raymond Goethals, (1921–2004) soccer player and coach.
25. Jean-Pierre Dardenne and Luc Dardenne, film directors (Rosetta, L'Enfant, which both won the Palme d'Or).
26. Annie Cordy, (1928-2020) singer and comedian.
27. Marguerite Yourcenar, (1903–1987) novelist (Mémoires d'Hadrien).
28. Amélie Nothomb, (born 1966) novelist (Hygiène de l'assassin).
29. Dirk Frimout, (born 1941) astronaut. First Belgian in space.
30. André Ernest Modeste Grétry, (1741–1813) composer (Zémire et Azor, Richard Coeur-de-lion).
31. Jacky Ickx, (born 1945) racing car driver.
32. Luc Varenne, sports journalist.
33. Peyo, (1928–1992) comics artist (The Smurfs, Johan and Peewit).
34. Salvatore Adamo, (born 1943) singer (Tombe la neige, La Nuit, Inch'Allah).
35. Maurice Grevisse, (1895–1980) grammarian (Le Bon Usage).
36. Albert II, (born 1934) Belgian king (1993–2013).
37. Jules Bordet, (1870–1961) microbiologist. Discovered the complement system and co-isolated the cause of whooping cough. Nobel Prize in Physiology or Medicine, 1921.
38. Leopold I, (1790–1865) king (1831–1865).
39. Stéphane Steeman, comedian.
40. Eugène Ysaÿe, (1858–1931) violinist.
41. John Cockerill, (1790–1840) industrialist (John Cockerill).
42. Maurane, (1960–2018) pop singer (Danser).
43. Émilie Dequenne, (born 1981) film actress (Rosetta).
44. Toots Thielemans, (1922–2016) jazz musician (Bluesette).
45. Maurice Carême, (1899–1978) novelist and poet (Mère).
46. Haroun Tazieff, geologist.
47. Gerard Mercator, (1512–1594) cartographer. Founder of modern cartography.
48. Edith Cavell, (1865–1915) nurse. Born in Swardeston, Norfolk, and thus technically born in England.
49. Fabiola, (1928–2014) queen (1960–1993).
50. Ambiorix, tribal chieftain who won decisive battles against Julius Caesar.
51. Pierre Rapsat, (1948–2002) singer.
52. Albert Frère, (1926–2018) industrialist.
53. Christine Ockrent, (born 1944) journalist.
54. Gerard Mortier, (1943–2014) opera director.
55. Paul Delvaux, (1897–1994) painter.
56. Olivier Strelli, fashion designer.
57. Jules Delhaize, industrialist. Creator of the hardware store Delhaize.
58. Pieter Brueghel The Elder, (1525–1569) painter (The Peasant Wedding, The Blind Leading the Blind, Netherlandish Proverbs, Landscape with the Fall of Icarus).
59. César Franck, (1822–1890) composer (Grande Pièce Symphonique).
60. Franco Dragone, (1952-2022) theatre director.
61. Jaco Van Dormael, (born 1957) film director (Toto Le Héros).
62. André Delvaux, (1926–2002) film director (The Man Who Had His Hair Cut Short).
63. Jules Destrée, (1863–1936) politician and lawyer.
64. Elisabeth, queen (1909–1934). Established the Queen Elisabeth Medical Foundation and the Queen Elisabeth Competition.
65. Christiane Lenain, comedian and theatre actor.
66. Kim Clijsters, (born 1983) tennis player.
67. Emile Verhaeren, (1855–1916) novelist and poet (Les Flamandes).
68. Princess Astrid.(1905–1935)
69. Gerard Corbiau, (born 1941) film director (Le maître de musique, Farinelli).
70. Father Pire, (1910–1969) priest and humanitarian. Nobel Peace Prize, 1958.
71. Jean-Michel Folon, (1934–2005) artist.
72. Ilya Prigogine, (1917–2003) physical chemist, Nobel Prize for Chemistry, 1977.
73. Pierre Bartholomée, (born 1937) conductor and composer. Founded the Ensemble Musique Nouvelles and the Centre de Recherches et de Création Musicales de Wallonie.
74. Lise Thiry, (1921-2024) physician and politician. Developed a method of screening the AIDS virus.
75. Jules Bastin, (1933–1996) operatic bass singer.
76. Django Reinhardt, (1919–1953) jazz guitarist (Nuages).
77. Henri Vernes, (1918–2021) novelist (Bob Morane).
78. Georges Lemaître, (1894–1933) astronomer, creator of the Big Bang Theory.
79. Morris, (1923–2001) comics artist (Lucky Luke).
80. Maurice Maeterlinck, (1862–1949) novelist and playwright (The Blue Bird, Pelléas and Mélisande). Nobel Prize for Literature, 1911.
81. Prince Philippe, Duke of Brabant, (born 1960) crown prince (since 2013 king Philippe of Belgium).
82. Paul Vanden Boeynants, (1919–2001) Prime Minister (1966–1968) (1978–1979) and Minister of Defense (1972–1979).
83. Arno Hintjens, (1949–2022) rock singer (TC Matic).
84. Elvis Pompilio, (born 1961) fashion designer.
85. Gabrielle Petit, (1893–1916) spy.
86. Jean-Joseph Charlier, (1794–1886) revolutionary.
87. Emile Vandervelde, (1886–1938) politician.
88. Isabelle Gatti de Gamond, (1839–1905) activist and feminist. Launched the first systematic courses of secondary female education (Cours d'Éducation pour jeunes filles).
89. Gaston Eyskens, (1905–1988) Prime Minister (1948–1950) (1958–1961) (1968–1973).
90. Godfried Danneels, (1933–2019) cardinal of Belgium (1979–2010).
91. James Ensor, (1860–1949) painter (Christ's Entry Into Brussels in 1889).
92. André Renard, (1911–1962) politician and trade unionist. Founder of the Mouvement Populaire Wallon.
93. François Bovesse, politician. Minister of Justice (1934–1935) (1936–1937) and Minister of Public Education (1935–1936)
94. Pierre Kroll, cartoonist.
95. Arlette Vincent, TV presenter (Le Jardin Extraordinaire).
96. Gustave Boël, (1837–1912) industrialist (Usines Gustave Boël).
97. Paule Herreman, (1919–1991) TV presenter and comedian.
98. Edgar P. Jacobs, (1904–1987) comics artist (Blake and Mortimer).
99. Jean Neuhaus, chocolate designer (Neuhaus).
100. Jean Roba, (1930–2006) comics artist (Boule et Bill).

== See also ==
- De Grootste Belg, The Flemish version of this contest.
- Greatest Britons spin-offs
