= Mes mains sur tes hanches =

1965 single by Adamo

- 7" vinyl French single cover

Single by Salvatore Adamo
- Language: French
- Released: May 1965
- Label: La Voix de son Maître (His Master's Voice / EMI)
- Songwriter: Salvatore Adamo
- Producer: Oscar Saintal

Salvatore Adamo singles chronology
"Elle..." (1964)	"Mes mains sur tes hanches" (1965)	"J'aime" (1965)

"Mes mains sur tes hanches" (transl. "My hands on your hips") is a song by Italian-Belgian singer, Salvatore Adamo.

It entered the hit parade in June 1965 and reached the number one spot the following month. It sold over 600,000 copies in France. This song is among the singer's hits from that period, such as "Tombe la neige" and "Vous permettez, Monsieur?".

== Track list ==
No.	Title	Writer(s)	Length
1.	"Mes mains sur tes hanches"	Adamo	2:55
2.	"Grand-père, grand-mère"	Adamo	2:20
3.	"Viens ma brune"	Adamo	3:05
4.	"Le barbu sans barbe"	Adamo	2:35

== Charts ==
Chart (1965–1967)	Peak position
Argentina (CAPIF)	8
Belgium (Ultratop 50 Flanders)	2
Belgium (Ultratop 50 Wallonia)	1
France (IFOP)	1
Italy (Musica e dischi)	1
Spain (AFYVE)	13
