= Le Rivoltelle =

Italian all-female musical group

Le Rivoltelle (English: "The Revolvers") is a musical group composed entirely of women that come from Cosenza, Italy.

== History ==
The musical group's project was born in Cosenza in 2005 from the meeting of four musicians: Elena, Alessandra, Paola and Angela. They are best known for re-proposing classics from the national and international repertoire of the 1960s and 1990s in a modern key through a mix of genres such as ska, rock and reggae.

In 2010 they released their debut single La notte with Cristiani Music Italy, a famous song by the Italian-Belgian singer Salvatore Adamo. The following year their first album was released: Donne Italiane, a tribute to Italy on the occasion of the celebrations for the 150th anniversary of Italian unification. 2012 saw the release of her second album: Le Rivoltelle, preceded by the single Taglia 38, which in her music video shows a performance by dancer Mary Garret aka Mariafrancesca Garritano. The same year they participated in the Mei Supersound Festival in Faenza organized by MEI.

== Members ==
=== Current members ===
- Elena Palermo: vocals, violin, saxophone, guitars
- Alessandra Turano: bass, guitars, backing vocals, vocals
- Monica Litrenta: drums, percussion, backing vocals
- Angela Massafra: guitars, backing vocals

=== Former members ===
- Paola Aiello: drums, percussion, backing vocals (until 2021)

== Discography ==
=== Albums ===
- Donne Italiane (2011)
- Le Rivoltelle (2012)
- Play & Replay (2017)

=== Singles ===
- La Notte (2010)
- Taglia 38 (2012)
