= Venoge =

Venoge may refer to:

- Venoge (river), river in Switzerland
- La Venoge (poem)
- De Venoge, champagne producer
