= UGB =

UGB may mean:

- An unguided bomb
- L'Université Gaston Berger, located outside Saint-Louis, was the second university established in Senegal (the first being Cheikh Anta Diop University), see Gaston Berger University
- Unión de Guerreros Blancos (White Warriors' Union), a death squad founded to repress leftist elements in El Salvador
- Urban growth boundary, a term in urban planning
- Usines Gustave Boël, Belgian iron and steel company
- Uttarakhand Gramin Bank, a co-operative bank in Uttarakhand, India
