= International Council of Women =

Organization advocating human rights for women

Highlighted countries have local organizations affiliated with ICW.

The International Council of Women (ICW) is a women's organization working across national boundaries for the common cause of advocating human rights for women. In March and April 1888, women leaders came together in Washington D.C., with 80 speakers and 49 delegates representing 53 women's organizations from 9 countries: Canada, the United States, Ireland, India, United Kingdom, Finland, Denmark, France and Norway. Women from professional organizations, trade unions, arts groups and benevolent societies participate. National councils are affiliated to the ICW and thus make themselves heard at the international level. The ICW enjoys consultative status with the United Nations and its Permanent Representatives to ECOSOC, ILO, FAO, WHO, UNDP, UNEP, UNESCO, UNICEF, UNCTAD, and UNIDO.

== Beginnings ==
During a visit to Europe in 1882, American suffragists Elizabeth Cady Stanton and Susan B. Anthony discussed the idea of an international women's organization with reformers in several countries. A committee of correspondence was formed to develop the idea further at a reception in their honor just before they returned home. The National Woman Suffrage Association, led by Anthony and Stanton, organized the founding meeting of the ICW, which convened in Washington, DC, on March 25, 1888. Representing Louisiana at the Woman's International Council was Caroline Elizabeth Merrick. The meeting was part of a celebration of the fortieth anniversary of the Seneca Falls Convention, the first women's rights convention.

Rachel Foster Avery managed much of the details of the planning of the first meeting of the ICW, and Susan B. Anthony presided over eight of the sixteen sessions. The ICW drafted a constitution and established national meetings every three years and international meetings every five years.

Millicent Garrett Fawcett of England was elected as the first president, but she declined to serve. Other British activists such as Margaret Tanner, Helen Priestman Bright Clark, Emily Sturge, Mary Estlin and Maria Colby signed a supportive letter sent to the first meeting, until the title "In the Fellowship of Womanhood."

In 1894, the ICW met in Berlin, where Alix von Cotta said that many senior teachers stayed away. The British activist, Margery Corbett Ashby was in attendance, and recalls the event and the relationship of the ICW with the IWSA in an interview with the historian, Brian Harrison, as part of the Suffrage Interviews project, titled Oral evidence on the suffragette and suffragist movements: the Brian Harrison interviews. In 1899, they met in London.

In the early years, the United States supported many of the expenses of the organization, and dues from U.S. members made up a significant part of the budget. Most meetings were held in Europe or North America, and they adopted the use of three official languages – English, French and German – which discouraged participation by women of non-European origin. The ICW did not actively promote women's suffrage, as to not upset the more conservative members.

In 1899, the council began to take on more substantive issues, forming an International Standing Committee on Peace and International Arbitration. Other standing committees were soon established, and through them, the ICW became involved in issues from suffrage to health.

== Twentieth century ==
In 1904, at the Berlin congress of the ICW, a separate organization formed to accommodate the strong feminist identity of the national suffrage associations: the International Woman Suffrage Alliance. The 1909 congress was held in Toronto, Canada and the 1914 conference took place in Rome. The 6th Congress was held in 1920 in Kristiania, Norway; followed in 1925 by the Washington, D. C. Congress; and then in 1930, the conference was held in Vienna. The next conference was a jointly-held congress of the ICW and the National Council of Women in India, hosted in Calcutta in 1936. During World War II congresses were suspended.

In 1925, the ICW convened their first coalition, the Joint Standing Committee of the Women's International Organisations, to lobby for the appointment of women to the League of Nations. By 1931 the League of Nations called together a Women's Consultative Committee on Nationality to address the issue of a woman's rights (and nationality) when married to a man from another country. Two additional coalitions were formed in 1931: the Liaison Committee and the Peace and Disarmament Committee. The ICW constitution was revised in 1936. The ICW worked with the League of Nations during the 1920s and the United Nations post-World War II.

By 1938 the number of councils affiliated with the ICW, which had developed into one of the best known and most consulted of women's international organizations, had risen to thirty-six.

World War II caused great disorganization in the council's work. Some national councils discontinued their work altogether; in others the leadership and organization were disrupted. In 1946, the ICW met in Philadelphia to re-focus its efforts and recover its former unity. The Conference issued a statement condemning war and all crimes against humanity, as well as demanding a more active role for women in the national and international arena.

== Present day ==
Since 1947, ICW has Consultative Status to the United Nations Economic and Social Council (ECOSOC) the highest accreditation an NGO can achieve at the United Nations. Currently, the ICW is composed of 70 countries and has a headquarters in Paris. International meetings are held every three years.

List of presidents of ICW
President	Duration	Nationality
none	1888–1893	-
Ishbel Hamilton-Gordon	1893–1899	Scotland
May Wright Sewall	1899–1904	United States
Ishbel Maria Hamilton-Gordon	1904–1920	Scotland
Pauline Chaponnière-Chaix	1920–1922	Switzerland
Ishbel Maria Hamilton-Gordon	1922–1936	Scotland
Marthe Boël	1936–1947	Belgium
Renée Girod	(interim) 1940–1945	Switzerland
Jeanne Eder-Schwyzer	1947–1957	Switzerland
Marie-Hélène Lefaucheux	1957–1963	France
Mary McGeachy	1963–1973	Canada
Mehrangiz Dowlatshahi	1973–1976	Iran
Ngarmchit Purachatra	1976–1979	Thailand
Miriam Dell	1979–1986	New Zealand
Hong Sook-ja	1986–1988	South Korea
Lily Boeykens	1988–1994	Belgium
Kuraisin Sumhadi	1994–1997	Indonesia
Pnina Herzog	1997–2003	Israel
Anamah Tan	2003–2009	Singapore
Cosima Schenk	2009–2015	Switzerland
Kim Jungsook	2015–2022	South Korea
Martine Marandel	2022–	France

== International meetings ==
1888: Washington, D.C. (First Meeting)

1894: Berlin

1899: London

1904: Berlin

1909: Toronto

1914: Rome

1920: Kristiania

1925: Washington, D.C.

1930: Vienna

1933: Chicago

1936: Kolkata, organized jointly by the CIT and the National Council of Women in India

1946: Philadelphie

2006: Kyiv

2009: Johannesburg

2015: Seoul

2015: Izmir

2018: Yogyakarta

2022: Avignon

== Archives ==
Papers of the International Council of Women are held at The Women's Library. Other papers are held at the United Nations Library in Geneva, the Library of Congress in Washington, the UNESCO archives in Paris, the International Information Centre and Archives for the Women's Movement in Amsterdam, the Archive Center for Women's History (CARHIF) in Brussels, the Sophia Smith Library at Smith College, Massachusetts, the Margaret Cousins Memorial library in New Delhi, and the Lady Aberdeen Collection in the University of Waterloo (Ontario) Library Special Collections.

== Affiliates ==
National Council of Women of the United States was founded in 1888 at the first ICW gathering. The National Council of Women of Canada was founded in 1893. The National Council of French Women was created in 1901, the National Council of Italian Women in 1903, and the National Council of Belgian Women in 1905. The first National Council of Women of Australia was established in 1931 to coordinate the state bodies existing prior to Australia's Federation.

== See also ==
- List of women's organizations
- Mapping the World of Women's Information Services

== Bibliography ==
- Beyers, Leen (2005), Des Femmes Qui Changent le Monde: Histoire du Conseil International des Femmes, 1888-1988, Bruxelles: Racine, ISBN 2-87386-399-4
- Liddington, Jill (1989). The Road to Greenham Common: Feminism and Anti-militarism in Britain Since 1820. Syracuse University Press. ISBN 978-0-8156-2539-1.
- Rupp, Leila J. (1994), "Constructing Internationalism: The Case of Transnational Women's Organizations, 1888-1945", The American Historical Review, 99 (5): 1571–1600, doi:10.2307/2168389, JSTOR 2168389
- Rupp, Leila J. (2011), "Transnational Women's Movements", European History Online, Mainz: Institute of European History
- Schneider, Dorothy; Schneider, Carl J. (1993), "Chapter 8. Women's War Against War", American Women in the Progressive Era, 1900-1920, New York: Facts on File, ISBN 0-8160-2513-4
