= Kim Jeong-suk =

Kim Jeong-suk or Kim Jong-suk (Korean: 김정숙) may refer to:

- Kim Jong-suk (1917–1949), spouse of North Korean national leader Kim Il-sung
  - Kimjongsuk County
- Kim Jong-suk (politician) (born 1930)
- Kim Jung-sook (born 1954), former First Lady of South Korea
- Kim Jungsook (born 1946), women's rights activist
- Fleur Pellerin (née Kim Jong-Suk, born 1973), French businesswoman and politician

== See also ==
- Kim (Korean surname), for other people with the same surname
- Jung-sook, for other people with the same given name
