= De Grootste Belg =

2005 vote for the most important Belgian person

- Genre: Competition show
- Presented by: Koen Fillet
- Country of origin: Belgium
- Original language: Dutch
- No. of seasons: 1
- No. of episodes: 11

Production
- Running time: 60 minutes
- Production company: De Mensen

Original release
- Network: Canvas, Radio 1
- Release: 27 October – 1 December 2005

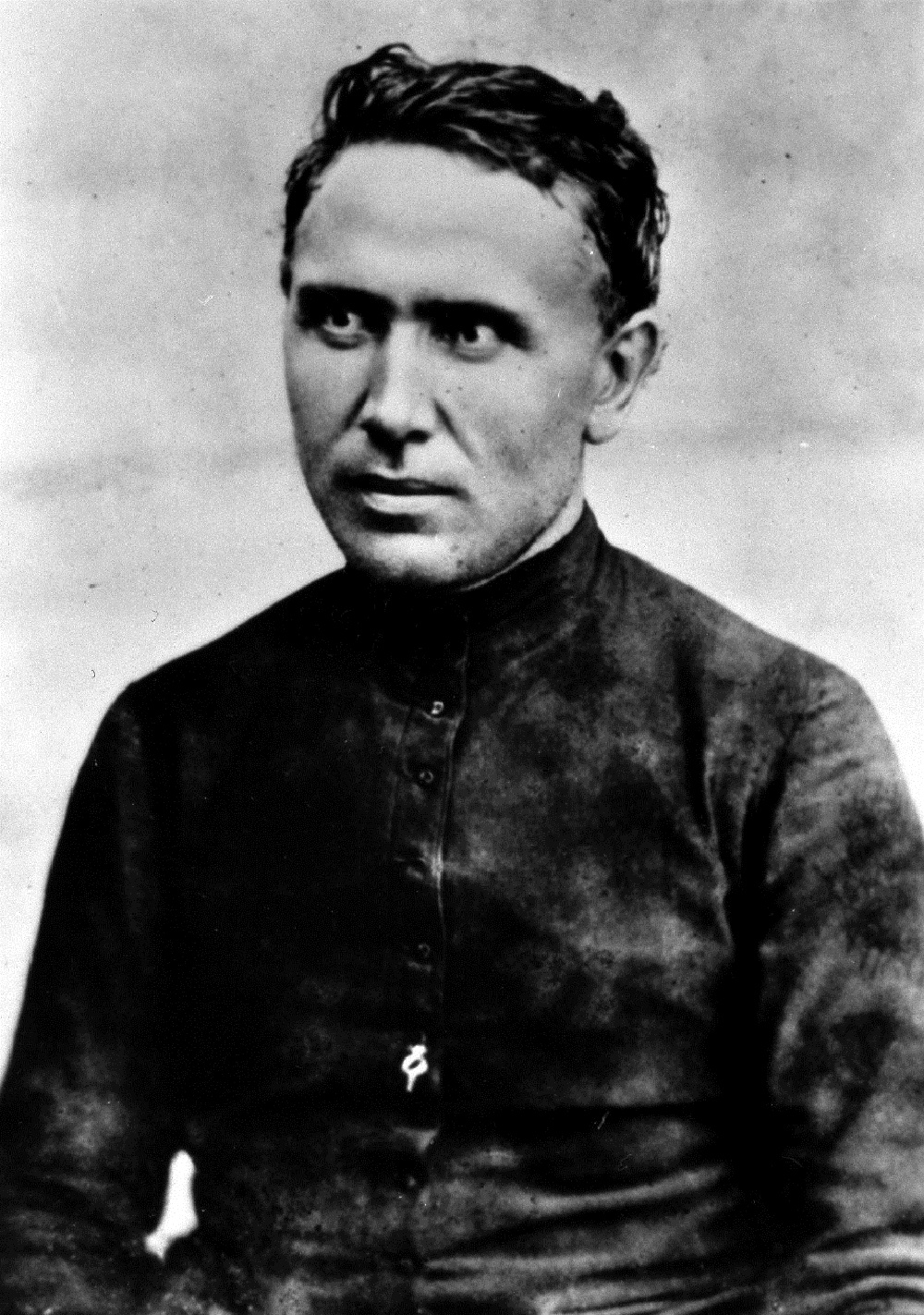
Father Damian in 1878 on Molokai. He was voted the "Greatest Belgian" in 2005.

De Grootste Belg (The Greatest Belgian) is a 2005 vote conducted by Belgian public TV broadcaster Canvas, public radio broadcaster Radio 1, and newspaper De Standaard, to determine who is the Greatest Belgian of all time. It could be considered as a Flemish list, considering that French-speaking community broadcast RTBF also held a vote, Le plus grand Belge. Nominees needed to have lived between 50 BC and now, between the borders of present-day Belgium. This is because Belgium only gained its independence in 1830, while numerous historical individuals from, for example, the Spanish Netherlands, are considered to be "Belgians".

An initial list of 111 names (100 decided by a panel, 11 added by the public after a preliminary poll) was set online. People could vote for their favourites to reduce the longlist to a shortlist of ten. After the first television show, the final list of ten nominees was announced. Two of them, Ambiorix and Hendrik Conscience, came out of the 11 names chosen by the public instead of the 100 chosen by the panel. The ten finalists were each presented on Canvas with a documentary, their nomination defended by famous Flemish people.

On 1 December 2005, Pater Damiaan was announced as the winner of the "De Grootste Belg" poll, beating Paul Janssen and Eddy Merckx.

== Top 10 ==
Rank	Person	Notability	Nomination defended by	Ref.
1	Father Damien	Priest and humanitarian. Went to help leprosy victims in Molokai. Beatified in 1995, Canonized on 11 October 2009.	Jef Vermassen, lawyer.	
2	Paul Janssen	Physician. Founder of Janssen Pharmaceutica. Discovered more than 80 new medicines, including a record-breaking four which are listed on the WHO list of essential medicines.	Frieda Van Wyck, TV presenter	
3	Eddy Merckx	Cyclist, often named the greatest in his sport. Won more than 525 individual races, including three world championships, five times the Tour de France and an hour record which stood for 28 years.	Mark Uytterhoeven, TV presenter	
4	Ambiorix	Chieftain and resistance leader. Fought against Julius Caesar and won a decisive battle against him, after which he disappeared without ever being caught.	Patrick de Witte, writer and comedian	
5	Adolf Daens	Priest, activist and humanitarian. Helped poor people and fought for the rights of workers.	Inge Vervotte, politician	
6	Andreas Vesalius	Physician, father of modern anatomy.	Robrecht Van Hee, professor.	
7	Jacques Brel	Singer, most famous for Ne Me Quitte Pas and Le Plat Pays. Celebrated for his passionate, satirical and acerbic songs. Internationally covered by many singers and admired for his free-spirited nature.	Johan Verminnen, singer	
8	Gerardus Mercator	Cartographer. Founder of modern cartography.	Dirk Draulans, biologist	
9	Peter Paul Rubens	Painter. Creator of vivid, extravagant and sensual works (The Descent from the Cross), which made him the richest and most high-in-demand painter of his time period. Still internationally famous and respected to this day.	Herr Seele, comics artist	
10	Hendrik Conscience	Novelist. Author of the novel The Lion of Flanders, which was a major influence on the Flemish nationalistic movement.	Marc Reynebeau, journalist and historian.	

== From 11 to 111 ==
Rank	Person	Notability	Nomination defended by	Ref.
11	Desiderius Erasmus	Writer, philosopher, theologian (In Praise of Folly). Born in Rotterdam or Gouda and thus technically a Dutchman by modern-day standards.		
12	Adolphe Sax	Inventor of the saxophone.		
13	Jan Decleir	Theatre, TV and film actor (Mira, Daens, Character, The Memory of a Killer).		
14	Kim Clijsters	Tennis player.		
15	Victor Horta	Architect and designer (Hôtel Tassel, Brussels-Central railway station, Centre for Fine Arts, Brussels).		
16	Baudouin of Belgium	King (1950–1993) and founder of the King Baudouin Foundation.		
17	Pieter Bruegel the Elder	Painter (The Peasant Wedding, The Blind Leading the Blind, Netherlandish Proverbs, Landscape with the Fall of Icarus).		
18	René Magritte	Painter (The Treachery of Images, The Son of Man).		
19	Guido Gezelle	Poet (Het Schrijverke, Dien Avond en die Rooze).		
20	Toots Thielemans	Jazz musician (Bluesette).		
21	Charles V of Spain	Spanish king (1517–1556) and Holy Roman Emperor (1519–1558), who was born in Ghent.		
22	Louis Paul Boon	Novelist (De Kapellekensbaan, Priester Daens, Mieke Maaike's Obscene Jeugd).		
23	Jozef Cardijn	Priest, cardinal and humanitarian. Founder of the Young Christian Workers.		
24	Hergé	Comics artist (The Adventures of Tintin, Quick and Flupke).		
25	James Ensor	Painter (Christ's Entry Into Brussels in 1889).		
26	Peter Piot	Physician. Co-discoverer of the Ebola virus, for which he found a way to contain the epidemic.		
27	Jan van Eyck	Painter (Ghent Altarpiece, The Arnolfini Portrait).		
28	Christoffel Plantijn	Printer and publisher.		
29	Willy Vandersteen	Comics artist (Suske en Wiske, De Rode Ridder)		
30	Hugo Claus	Novelist, poet, playwright and film director (The Sorrow of Belgium).		
31	Jan Frans Willems	Writer and activist. Founder of the Flemish movement.		
32	Leo Baekeland	Chemist. Inventor of bakelite.		
33	Lieven Gevaert	Businessman. Founder of Gevaert & Co (now Agfa-Gevaert).		
34	Arno Hintjens	Rock singer (TC Matic).		
35	Mark Uytterhoeven	TV presenter and sports journalist (Het Huis van Wantrouwen, Morgen Maandag, Alles Kan Beter).		
36	Dirk Martens	Printer.		
37	Justine Henin-Hardenne	Tennis player.		
38	Raymond Goethals	Association football player and trainer.		
39	Ernest Solvay	Chemist, businessman and philanthropist. Inventor of the ammonia-soda process.		
40	Paul-Henri Spaak	Prime Minister (1938–1939; 1946; 1947–1949). President of the United Nations General Assembly (1946–1947), Secretary General of N.A.T.O. (1957–1961). President of the Common Assembly of the European Coal and Steel Community (1952–1954).		
41	Achiel Van Acker	Prime Minister (1945–1946; 1946; 1954–1958).		
42	Marie Popelin	Activist and feminist. Founder of the women's right movement Ligue belge du droit des femmes. First Belgian woman to receive a law doctorate.		
43	Paul Delvaux	Painter.		
44	Simon Stevin	Mathematician. Described the Decimal system for fractions and did mathematical groundwork for the construction of fortifications. Made windmills more efficient. Was the first to explain the tides using the attraction of the moon, discovered the hydrostatic paradox and proved the inclined plane.		
45	Julien Lahaut	Politician.		
46	Christine Van Broeckhoven	Molecular biologist. Did research on Alzheimer dementia, bipolar mental disorders and other neurological diseases.		
47	Queen Elisabeth	Queen (1909–1934). Established the Queen Elisabeth Medical Foundation and the Queen Elisabeth Competition.		
48	Marc Sleen	Comics artist (The Adventures of Nero, Piet Fluwijn en Bolleke, De Lustige Kapoentjes).		
49	Willem Elsschot	Novelist and poet (Het Huwelijk, Villa des Roses, Lijmen/Het Been and Kaas).		
50	Paul Van Ostaijen	Poet (Boem Paukeslag!, Melopee).		
51	Pierre-Théodore Verhaegen	Lawyer and politician. Founder of the Free University of Brussels.		
52	Raymond Ceulemans	Billiards player.		
53	Jean-Marie Pfaff	Association football player.		
54	Georges Pire	Priest and humanitarian. Nobel Peace Prize, 1958.		
55	Isabelle Gatti de Gamond	Activist and feminist. Launched the first systematic courses of secondary female education (Cours d'Éducation pour jeunes filles).		
56	Philip the Good	Duke of Burgundy (1419–1467).		
57	Adrien de Gerlache de Gomery	Polar explorer. First man to spend a few months on Antarctica.		
58	Edward Anseele	Politician.		
59	Pascal Vyncke	Creator of the website SeniorenNet. His high vote was a result of many people, including himself and his family under a different name, trying to get him into this list.		
60	Christian de Duve	Cytologist and biochemist. Did research after the microstructure of cells. Nobel Prize in Physiology or Medicine, 1974.		
61	Georges Lemaître	Priest, astronomer, mathematician. Developed the Big Bang theory.		
62	Rembert Dodoens	Physician and botanist (Cruydeboeck).		
63	John Cockerill	Businessman; founder of John Cockerill.		
64	Ilya Prigogine	Physical chemist. Nobel Prize for Chemistry, 1977.		
65	Tom Barman	Rock singer (dEUS).		
66	Django Reinhardt	Jazz guitarist (Nuages).		
67	Gaston Eyskens	Prime Minister (1948–1950; 1958–1961; 1968–1973).		
68	Anne Teresa De Keersmaeker	Choreographer (Rosas danst Rosas).		
69	Camille Huysmans	Prime Minister (1946–1947) and activist.		
70	Antoon van Dyck	Painter (Charles I at the Hunt, Equestrian Portrait of Charles I).		
71	Briek Schotte	Cyclist.		
72	Henry Van de Velde	Architect (Bloemenwerf, Boekentoren).		
73	Rik Coppens	Association football player.		
74	Hadewijch	Poet (Book of Visions, Poems in Stanzas).		
75	Ingrid Berghmans	Judoka		
76	Orlandus Lassus	Composer (Lagrime di San Pietro, Prophetiae Sibyllarum).		
77	Georges Simenon	Novelist (Inspector Maigret).		
78	Rik Van Looy	Cyclist.		
79	Ferdinand Verbiest	Priest, astronomer and mathematician.		
80	Dries Van Noten	Fashion designer.		
81	Cyriel Buysse	Novelist and playwright (Het gezin van Paemel).		
82	Hans Memling	Painter (The Last Judgment, St. Ursula Shrine).		
83	Jeanne Brabants	Ballet choreographer. Founder of the Royal Ballet of Flanders.		
84	Tom Lanoye	Novelist (Alles Moet Weg, Kartonnen Dozen, Het Goddelijke Monster).		
85	Rik Van Steenbergen	Cyclist.		
86	Adolphe Quételet	Astronomer, mathematician, statistician and sociologist. Developed the body mass index scale.		
87	Gaston Roelants	Athlete. Olympic gold medal for 3000 m steeplechase (1964), European Championship 3000 m steeplechase (1962).		
88	Jan van Ruusbroec	Poet (The Seven Steps of the Ladder of Spiritual Love, The Spiritual Espousals).		
89	Paul Van Himst	Association football player and trainer.		
90	Emile Vandervelde	Politician. Minister of Justice (1918–1921) and Minister of Foreign Affairs (1925–1927).		
91	Amélie Nothomb	Novelist (Hygiène de l'assassin).		
92	Frans Van Cauwelaert	Politician and activist.		
93	Constant Vanden Stock	Association football player and trainer.		
94	Gabrielle Petit	Nurse and resistance fighter.		
95	Marc Van Montagu	Molecular biologist. Co-founder of the Plant Genetic Systems and CropDesign companies. Discovered the Ti plasmid.		
96	Auguste Beernaert	Prime Minister (1884–1894). Nobel Peace Prize, 1909.		
97	Marcel Broodthaers	Artist (Surface of mussels (with bag))).		
98	Maurice Maeterlinck	Novelist and playwright (The Blue Bird, Pelléas and Mélisande). Nobel Prize for Literature, 1911.		
99	Pedro de Gante	Missionary. Beatified in 1988.		
100	Philippe Herreweghe	Conductor. Founder of the Collegium Vocale Gent and La Chapelle Royale.		
101	Rogier van der Weyden	Painter (The Descent from the Cross).		
102	Fernand Khnopff	Painter (The Sphinx, or, The Caresses).		
103	César Franck	Composer (Grande Pièce Symphonique).		
104	Gerard Mortier	Opera director.		
105	Pierre Wynants	Cook.		
106	Henri Pirenne	Historian (Histoire de Belgique).		
107	Pierre Deligne	Mathematician. Proved the Weil conjectures.		
108	Raoul Servais	Animator and film director (Harpya).		
109	Emile Francqui	Soldier, diplomat and philanthropist.		
110	Charles Rogier	Prime Minister (1847–1852; 1857–1867).		
111	Hugo van der Goes	Painter (Portinari Altarpiece).		

== See also ==
- Les plus grands Belges, the Walloon version of this contest held around the same time.
- Greatest Britons spin-offs
