= Elle... (Adamo song) =

1964 single by Adamo

- 7" vinyl Spanish single cover

Single by Salvatore Adamo

from the album Adamo Volume 2
- Language: French
- B-side: "Petit Camarade"
- Released: December 1964
- Label: La Voix de son Maître (His Master's Voice / EMI)
- Songwriter: Salvatore Adamo

Salvatore Adamo singles chronology
"La Nuit" (1964)	"Elle..." (1964)	"Mes mains sur tes hanches" (1965)

"Elle..." is a French language song, written and sung by Belgian-Italian singer Salvatore Adamo. It was released in late 1964.

== Track list ==
No.	Title	Writer(s)	Length
1.	"Elle..."	Adamo	2:55
2.	"Petit Camarade"	Adamo	2:45

== Charts ==
Chart (1965–1967)	Peak position
Belgium (Ultratop 50 Flanders)	5
Belgium (Ultratop 50 Wallonia)	6
Chile (Billboard)	2
Italy (Musica e dischi)	1
