= Pol Clovis Boël =

Belgian industrialist and liberal politician

Pol-Clovis Boël
- Born: Pol-Clovis, Baron Boël; 2 August 1868; Saint-Vaast, Belgium
- Died: 13 July 1941 (aged 72); Brussels, Belgium
- Occupations: industrialist, politician

Pol-Clovis, Baron Boël (2 August 1868 – 13 July 1941) was a Belgian industrialist, Director of the Usines Gustave Boël in La Louvière, and liberal politician.

Born in Saint-Vaast, he was a son of Gustave Boël. He married Marthe de Kerchove de Denterghem. They had 4 children (3 boys and 1 girl): René Boël (1899–1990) married first Yvonne Solvay (1896–1930) and later Mathilde de Jonghe (1909–2008); Max Boël (1901–1975) married Anne Marie Guinotte; Lucien Boël (1903–1999) married Micheline Mallet; and their daughter Marie-Anne Boël (1909–1996) married Charles-Emmanuel Janssen. Pol-Clovis youngest sister Eva Ernestine Boël (1883–1956) married Felix Goblet d'Alviella.

== Career ==
When Gustave Boël died in 1912, his son Pol-Clovis carried on the diversification of the family business. One of his most prominent successes in this area was in chemicals with the Société anonyme de fabrication des engrais azoté (Safea) (nitrate fertilizers). Pol-Clovis also invested in Union Chimique Belge (UCB), founded by Emmanuel Janssen (the father of his son-in-law Charles-Emmanuel Janssen), and in Solvay, founded by Ernest Solvay, the grandfather of his daughter-in-law Yvonne Solvay.

In 1928, Pol-Clovis Boël founded a financial entity: l'Union financière Boël, ancestor of several financial holdings, such as Sofina, Henex, Glaces de Moustier-sur-Sambre. After World War I, \Boël entered the world of Belgian finance, taking part in the creation of the Bank of Brussels and the Société Générale de Belgique. In 1929, he was granted the title of baron by King Albert I of Belgium.

Pol Clovis died in Brussels in 1941.

== Family and business ==
Boël married Marthe de Kerchove de Denterghem, daughter of Count Oswald de Kerchove de Denterghem, senator and governor of Hainaut.

In 1928 the Ernest Boucquéau forges, foundries and rolling mills were renamed the Usines Gustave Boël, and the next year Boël's son René married Yvonne Solvay, granddaughter of Ernest Solvay, linking the family to the chemicals giant. Boël's three sons divided the family's responsibilities: Lucien ran the factory at La Louvière, René managed the family's finances, and Max administered its property holdings. His daughter Marie-Anne, known as "Maya", married Charles-Emmanuel Janssen,later chairman of Union Chimique Belge.

== Sources ==
- Dutrieue, Anne-Myriam, in : Kurgan-van Hentenrijk, Ginette, Jaumain, Serge, Montens, Valérie, ea, Dictionnaire des patrons en Belgique. Les hommes, les entreprises, les reseaux, Bruxelles, De Boeck and Larcier, 1996, p. 61-62.
- Douxchamps, José, Présence nobiliaire au parlement belge (1830–1970). Notes généalogiques, Wépion-Namen, José Douxchamps, 2003, p. 13.
