= Renée Girod =

Swiss physician and women's activist (1887–1962)

Renée Girod (2 July 1887 - 12 September 1962) was a Swiss physician and women's activist.

== Biography ==
Girod was born in Geneva as the daughter of Maurice Antoine Girod, who eventually became a major in the Swiss General Staff, and his wife Blanche Marie (née Borel). Girod was trained in Bern as a nurse and served as a paramedic during First World War. Only after the war did she finish secondary school in 1919 and began studying medicine. In Geneva, she became a medical doctor in 1927. She first worked for the Salvation Army, then settled to become a medical practitioner for socially disadvantaged women and children.

In Geneva, she became president of the local «Frauenzentrale» (women's help center) and of the commission for hygiene in the Federation of Swiss women's associations. The latter organization was part of the International Council of Women (ICW), where Girod became the Swiss representative. When the Second World War erupted, the ICW president Marthe Boël from Belgium was detained and unable to perform her duties, so Renée Girod was chosen to serve as interim president during the German occupation of Belgium in the years after 1940. Only in May 1945, Boël regained the capabilities to run her office again, until 1947.

Girod also was co-founder and vice president of an organization to help expectant mothers, and was involved in the social project Vernets d’Arve. She died in Geneva in 1962.
