= Nuit (disambiguation) =

Nuit is the primary goddess of the religious movement Thelema.

Nuit or La Nuit may also refer to:

- La Nuit (book), a 1958 memoir by Elie Wiesel
- La Nuit (comics), a Marvel Comics character
- "Nuit" (song), a 1990 song recorded by Jean-Jacques Goldman, Carole Fredericks and Michael Jones
- "La Nuit" (song), a 1964 song by Salvatore Adamo
- "La Nuit", a song by Robots in Disguise from the French version of their album Get RID!
- Nuit #1, a 2011 Canadian film directed by Anne Émond
- Nut (goddess), an Ancient Egyptian goddess

== See also ==
- Night (disambiguation)
