= Marthe de Kerchove de Denterghem =

Belgian feminist

Marthe Boël (née de Kerchove de Denterghem; Ghent, 3 July 1877 – 18 January 1956) was a Belgian feminist. She was the third daughter of the liberal senator Count Oswald de Kerchove de Denterghem and Maria Lippens, daughter of August Lippens.

== Biography ==
She studied in Ghent and Paris, where she obtained the brevet supérieur in 1895. In 1898, she married Pol Boël, director of the Usines Gustave Boël in La Louvière. She engaged in several charities and founded the Cercle des Dames Libérales. Through her father she came into contact with the Belgian feminist movement and where she met Hélène Goblet d’Alviella and Jane Brigode. When World War I broke out she started working as a nurse and joined the Union patriotique des femmes belges led by Jane Brigode. She joined the resistance and was arrested, together with her husband, in October 1916 and after a trial in Charleroi imprisoned in Siegburg. Her health deteriorated during her stay in prison and in 1917 she was exchanged for Frau von Schnee, the wife of the governor of German East Africa. The remainder of the war she lived in exile in Gstaad (Switzerland).

As a war hero, she was one of few women who were allowed to vote in Belgium in national elections after the war. Jane Brigode introduced her to the Liberal Party, where in 1919 she became a member of the Commission on Women problems under Paul-Emile Janson. Disappointed by the reluctance of the political parties to grant women the right to vote, she organized in 1920 the first Women Conference together with Jane Brigode. In 1921, she and Jane Brigode founded the Union des femmes liberales de l’arrondissement de Bruxelles and in 1923 they founded, together with Alice De Keyser-Buysse the National Federation of Liberal Women, of which she became the first President. She resigned however in 1936 as she wanted to broaden her horizon and work over the boundaries of political parties.

In 1921 she had become a member of the National Council of Women (Conseil National des Femmes Belges - CNFB) which had been founded by Marie Popelin in 1904 and in 1935 she succeeded Marguerite Van de Wiele as its president. In 1936, at the conference of Dubrovnik, she was elected President of the International Council of Women. As a member of the Union belge pour la Société des Nations, she had contacts with Paul Hymans, Pierre Orts and Jules Destrée. She was appointed by the League of Nations as President of the commission for the emancipation of women and the international political role of women.

At the outbreak on World War II, she retreated at her estate in Chenoy near Brussels where her husband died in 1941. When the Université libre de Bruxelles had to close its doors by the Nazis, she provided space at her estate and a meeting place. After the war, in 1947, she resigned as President of the International Council of Women. In 1952 she spoke for the last time at a conference of the council at the Acropolis from the Parthenon, the temple of Pallas Athena.

She was honored at several occasions for her work, she died on 18 January 1956.

== Bibliography ==
- Marthe Boël, 1920-1950. Trente ans d'activité féminine. Extrait de discours et de messages, Paris-Brussels, A l'enseigne du Chat qui pêche, 1950.
- Marthe Boël and Christiane Duchène, Le féminisme en Belgique 1892-1914, Brussels, Editions du Conseil national des femmes belges, 1955.

== Sources ==
- Duchène, C., in : Biographie Nationale, Brussel, Académie Royale des Sciences, des Lettres et des Beaux Arts, 1866–1986, XXXIV, 1968, kol. 87–93.
- B. D'hondt, Gelijke rechten, gelijke plichten. Een portret van vijf liberale vrouwen, Liberaal archief
- Le Flambeau, jg. 39, 1956, nr. 2, Huldenummer Marthe de Kerchove de Denterghem baronne Boël.
