= Petit bonheur =

1969 single by Adamo

- 1969 German single cover

Single by Salvatore Adamo

from the album Adamo – studio 5
- Language: French
- B-side: "Mon cinéma"
- Released: 14 November 1969
- Length: 3:25
- Label: La voce del padrone
- Songwriter(s): Salvatore Adamo

Salvatore Adamo singles chronology
"Si le ciel est amoureux de toi" (1969)	"Petit bonheur" (1969)	"Le carrosse d'or" (1969)

"Petit bonheur" is a song by Italian-Belgian singer, Salvatore Adamo.

The song has been covered by other artists, such as Luc Steeno and Katja Ebstein. Adamo also recorded the song in Italian, German, and Spanish.

== Track list ==
No.	Title	Writer(s)	Length
1.	"Petit bonheur"	Adamo	3:25
2.	"Mon cinéma"	Adamo	4:00

== Charts ==
Chart (1969–1970)	Peak position
Austria (Ö3 Austria Top 40)	1
Belgium (Ultratop 50 Wallonia)	3
France (IFOP)	1
Italy (Musica e dischi)	30
Switzerland (Hitparade)	9
West Germany (Media Control)	6
