= Mary McGeachy =

Canadian diplomat and international civil servant

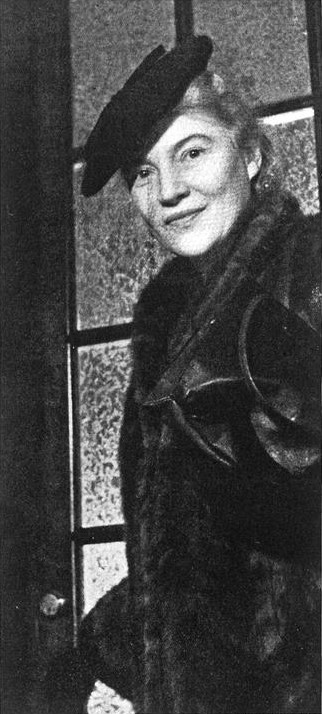
McGeachy in Maclean's, 1942

Mary McGeachy Schuller (7 November 1901 – 2 November 1991) was of Canadian nationality, a British diplomat and international civil servant.

== Biography ==
Mary McGeachy was born as Mary Craig McGeachy on 7 November 1901 in Sarnia, Ontario to Scottish-Canadian parents. Her father was a gospel hall preacher.

She graduated from the University of Toronto in 1924. She completed her studies in law and history with distinction. She briefly taught in a high school at Hamilton, Ontario. Her work experiences at International Student Service in the University of Toronto helped her to get a job as a senior assistant at Information Section of the League of Nations Secretariat in Geneva in 1928. During her service of more than a decade with the League of Nations, she worked as a liaison officer for the British Dominions. After the dissolution of the League of Nations in 1940, she joined, a temporary diplomatic post, the public relations department of the British Ministry of Economic Warfare.

In 1942, following her appointment as the first secretary of the British embassy in Washington, she became “the first woman to be given British diplomatic rank.” She was appointed as a Director to lead the newly created Welfare Division of the United Nations Relief and Rehabilitation Administration(UNRRA) in 1944. Since 1946, she was actively engaged in promoting women's welfare and rights. She was associated with International Council of Women (ICW), and served its president from 1963 to 1973.

She married Viennese-born banker Erwin Schuller.

She died in New York City on 2 November 1991.
