= Anamah Tan =

Singaporean lawyer

Anamah Tan is a Singaporean family law attorney and lobbyist.

Tan was born in 1940. She earned her law degree from the National University of Singapore in 1963 and was admitted as an advocate and solicitor in Singapore the same year. She initially worked for the Housing and Development Board before entering private practice during the 1970s. Tan became a founding member of the following organizations: Singapore Association of Women Lawyers (1974) and Singapore Council of Women’s Organizations (1980). During the 1980s, Tan was admitted as a solicitor in England and Wales.

In 2000, Tan earned her Doctor of Philosophy in business administration. Tan became the first Singaporean female elected as a member of the United Nations’ Committee on the Elimination of Discrimination against Women (CEDAW) in 2004. Additionally, during her tenure as a CEDAW member, she simultaneously served as the President of the International Council of Women (ICW) from 2003-2009.

== See also ==
- International Council of Women
