= Olivier Strelli =

Belgian fashion designer

Olivier Strelli born Nissim Israel is a Belgian fashion designer, who put Belgium on the fashion map. His name is now synonymous with a chain of male and female clothing and accessory boutiques in Belgium, Switzerland, France and China. In 2005, Francophone Belgian TV viewers voted Strelli 56th in a list of the 100 greatest Belgians of all time through the show Les plus grands Belges.

== Biography ==
Strelli was born in 1946 in Kinshasa, Belgian Congo the son of Italian and Greek Jews from the island of Rhodes who had migrated there in the early 20th century. The Congo was at that time Belgium's great colonial possession and non-African communities included Greeks and Sephardic-Jews who had fled political unrest in the Balkans. After Congolese Independence, Strelli's family ended up in Belgium where Olivier had studied textile design in Tournai. Based in Brussels from 1974, he created a line of off-the-peg male fashions and later opened his own boutique. His first full-line collection was shown in the Paris season of 1980. Famous clients since have included the Rolling Stones, Brigitte Bardot, Stevie Wonder and several members of the Belgian royal family. The yellow coat worn by Queen Paola during the coronation of her husband King Albert II in 1993 was a Strelli original. He has also designed uniforms for Belgian railway staff and for air hostesses of the now-defunct Belgian national airline Sabena.
