= Une larme aux nuages =

1967 single by Adamo

- 1967 Belgian single cover

Single by Salvatore Adamo

from the album Adamo – studio 4
- Language: French
- B-side: "Le néon"
- Released: September 1967
- Label: La voce del padrone
- Songwriter(s): Salvatore Adamo

Salvatore Adamo singles chronology
"Notre roman" (1967)	"Une larme aux nuages" (1967)	"J'ai tant de rêves dans mes bagages" (1967)

"Une larme aux nuages" is a song by Italian-Belgian singer, Salvatore Adamo.

This song has been covered by Bernhard Brink, Katja Ebstein, Klee and Luc Steeno. Adamo has also recorded the song in Italian, German, Spanish, English and Japanese.

== Track list ==
No.	Title	Writer(s)	Length
1.	"Une larme aux nuages"	Adamo	3:00
2.	"Le néon"	Adamo	3:00

== Charts ==
Chart (1967–1969)	Peak position
Austria (Ö3 Austria Top 40)	2
Belgium (Ultratop 50 Flanders)	4
Belgium (Ultratop 50 Wallonia)	2
Chile (Billboard)	3
France (IFOP)	1
Italy (Musica e dischi)	4
Spain (AFYVE)	6
Switzerland (Schweizer Hitparade)	10
West Germany (Media Control)	2
