= Pedro de Gante =

Franciscan missionary

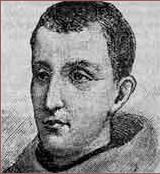
Brother Pedro de Gante

Pieter van der Moere, also known as Brother Pedro de Gante or Pedro de Mura (c. 1480 – 1572) was a Franciscan missionary in sixteenth century Mexico. Born in Geraardsbergen in present-day Belgium, he was of Flemish descent. Since Flanders, like Spain, belonged to the Habsburg Empire and he was a relative of King Charles V (he was thought to be a bastard son of Emperor Maximilian I), he was allowed to travel to the colonies of New Spain as one of a group of Franciscan friars. Gante's group in fact arrived before the 12 Franciscans normally thought of as the first friars in New Spain. In Mexico he spent his life as a missionary, teaching the indigenous population in Christian catechism and dogma. He learned Nahuatl, the language of the Aztecs, and composed a Christian "doctrina". One of his most significant contributions to Mexico was the creation of the School of San Jose de los Naturales. This was the first school set up by Europeans in the Americas.

In 1988 he was beatified, by Pope John Paul II. He was ranked 99th in a 2005 vote on the list of Greatest Belgians (De Grootste Belg).

== Works ==
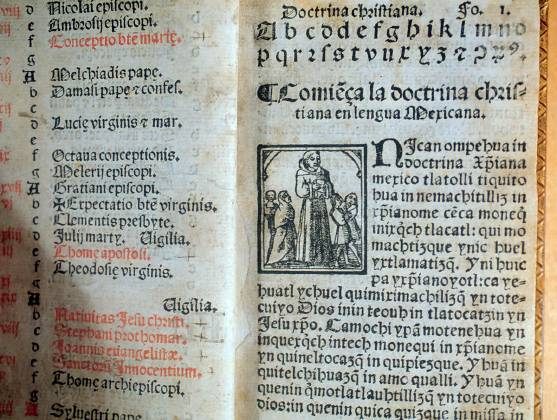
The 1553 manuscript of Doctrina Christiana by Pedro de Gante kept at Benson Latin American Collection, University of Texas, Austin

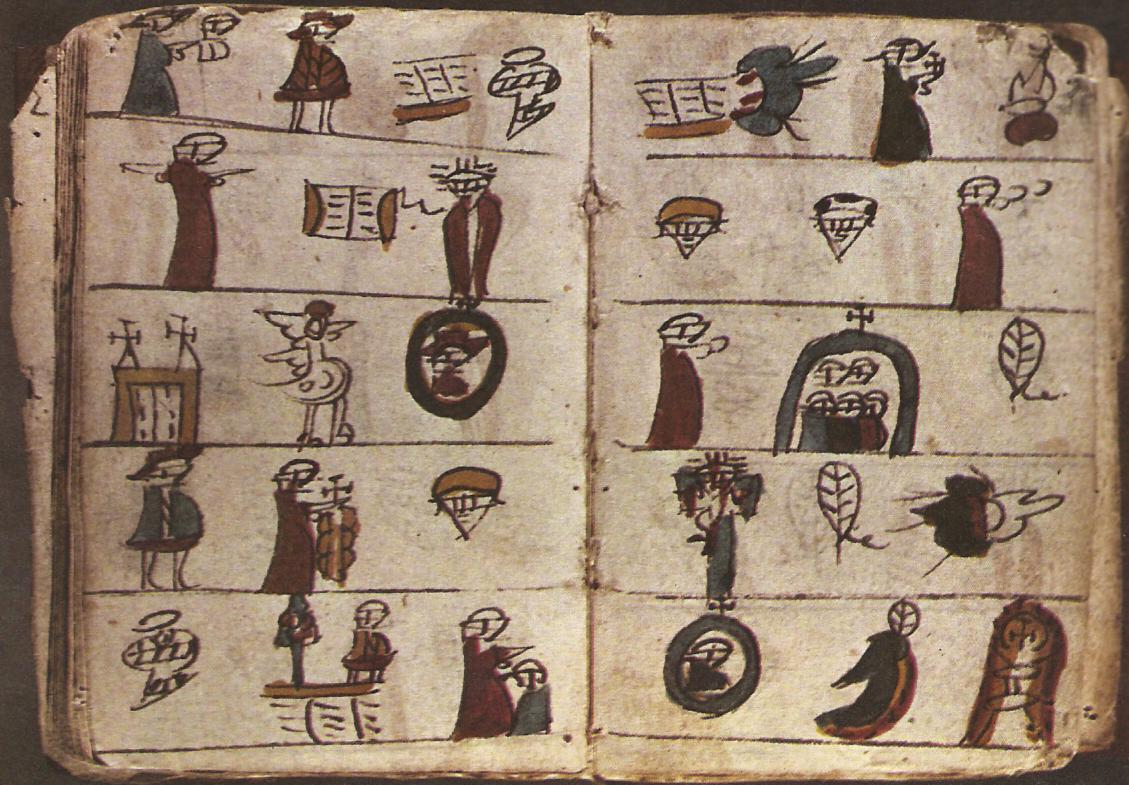
Catechism

Manuscripts

- Catecismo de la doctrina cristiana con jeroglíficos, para la enseñanza de los indios de México: Madrid, Archivo Histórico Nacional, Códice 1257B.

Published Works

- Doctrina Christiana en Lengua Mexicana. Per signum crucis. Icamachiotl cruz yhuicpain toya chua Xitech momaquixtili Totecuiyoc diose. Ica inmotocatzin. Tetatzin yhuan Tepilizin yhuan Spiritus Sancti. Amen Jesús (first published ca. 1547, Mexico: Juan Pablos; 1553, Amberes; 1553, Mexico: Juan Pablos, 1555. Facsimile edition with comments by ed. Ernesto de la Torre Villar (Mexico, 1981).
- Catecismo de la doctrina cristiana con jeroglíficos, para la enseñanza de los indios de México, Facsimile edition with comments by Federico Navarro (Madrid, 1970) / Justino Cortés Castellanos, El catecismo en pictogramas de Fr. Pedro de Gante (Madrid, 1987).
- Cartas, versos religiosos en mejicano, ed. en: Joaquín García Icazbalceta, Códice franciscano (Mexico, 1941), 212ff.
