= Charles-Emmanuel Janssen =

Charles Jean Emmanuel Janssen (Brussels, 19 March 1907 – 11 June 1985) was a Belgian liberal deputy of Walloon Brabant. He was the son of Emmanuel Janssen and Paule Van Parys. He was married to Marie-Anne Boël, daughter of the vice-president of the Belgian Senate Pol Boël. Together they had three children: Paul-Emmanuel Janssen, Eric Janssen, and Daniel Janssen.

== Sources ==
- Van Molle, P., Het Belgisch parlement 1894-1969, Gent, Erasmus, 1969, p. 196.
- Pourquoi Pas ?, 9 March 1956 en 5 April 1957.
- Janssen D. (article of son mentions father)
