= À demain sur la lune =

1969 single by Adamo

- 1969 Japanese single cover

Single by Salvatore Adamo

from the album Adamo – studio 5
- Language: French
- B-side: "Et vous n'ecoutez pas"
- Released: 4 July 1969
- Length: 3:50
- Label: La Voix de son maître
- Songwriter(s): Salvatore Adamo

Salvatore Adamo singles chronology
"Les gratte-ciel" (1969)	"À demain sur la lune" (1969)	"Si le ciel est amoureux de toi" (1969)

"À demain sur la lune" is a song by Italian-Belgian singer, Salvatore Adamo.

The song was recorded in Paris, with Alain Goraguer conducting the orchestra.

== Track listing ==
No.	Title	Writer(s)	Length
1.	"À demain sur la lune"	Adamo	3:50
2.	"Et vous n'ecoutez pas"	Adamo	3:06

== Charts ==
Chart (1969)	Peak position
Belgium (Ultratop 50 Wallonia)	13
France (IFOP)	8
West Germany (Media Control)	49
