= Kim Jungsook =

South Korean politician and women's rights activist

Kim Jungsook (born 21 August 1946) is an educator, politician and women's rights activist from South Korea.

== Life ==
Kim Jungsook first pursued a career in education, gaining her bachelor diploma at Korea University in 1969. She later got a master's degree, again in the field of education, at Ewha Womans University in 1984, then she became a Doctor of Education at the George Washington University in 1988. With the background of the Republic of Korea turning towards democracy, she founded the Korean Institute for Women and Politics (KIWP) in 1989. She was invited to teach some classes as a visiting professor, among others at Jeonbuk National University, Harvard University in the mid-90s, and at Korea University in the mid-2000s.

In 1993, she gained a short-lived political position as Vice Minister of Political Affairs in Gender Equality, in the Cabinet of Hwang In-sung. In 1994, she became a delegate to the United Nations Commission on the Status of Women, and remained in that role until 2017. She participated at the Beijing Conference in 1995, which she later viewed as a turning point in her struggle for gender equality. In 1996, she was elected for a first time into the National Assembly, and she would serve for a total of three terms in the Korean parliament, until 2004. From 1998 to 2000, she presided there as Chair on the Special Committee on Women's Affairs. In 2000, she became president of the Korean Women and Politics Association (KWPA). From 2003 to 2013, she was president of the Center for Asia-Pacific Women in Politics (CAPWIP); and from 2006 to 2012, she was president of Girl Scouts Korea. She was also co-chairwoman of the Korean Council for Reconciliation and cooperation (KCRC) from 2009 to 2015; and president of the Federation of Asia-Pacific Women's Associations (FAWA) from 2012 to 2014. She was president of the Korean Institute for Gender Equality Promotion and Education (KIGEPE) from 2016 to 2019.

From 2009 to 2015, she was president of the Korean National Council of Women (KNCW), the Korean branch of the International Council of Women (ICW). She left that position in 2015 when she became president of the ICW, and held office as president of ICW until 2022. Her successor was Martine Marandel.

== Honors ==
- Order of Service Merit (1994)
- Order of Civil Merit (2004)
- 2008: Honorary Doctorate of Political Science, Dankook University
