= Inch'Allah (Adamo song) =

1967 single by Adamo

Single by Adamo
- Language: French
- B-side: "Sont-Ce Vos Bijoux?"
- Released: 1967
- Recorded: 1967
- Label: EMI
- Songwriter: Salvatore Adamo

Adamo singles chronology
"Ensemble" (1967)	"Inch'Allah" (1967)	"Notre roman" (1967)

Music video
- "Inch'Allah" on YouTube

"Inch'Allah" is a song composed and sung in French by Salvatore Adamo in 1967. The lyrics were written by Adamo as a peace song in the context of the Six-Day War between Israel and the Arab States. The song was banned in virtually all Arab countries for what they perceived as its pro-Israel sentiments and the mentioning of Jerusalem as a Jewish city after it fell under Israeli control during the war.

== Title ==
Inch'Allah is the French equivalent of Insha'Allah (fr:Inch Allah), which means "if Allah wills" (or, loosely, "God willing"), in Arabic

== Track listing ==
The 45 rpm release include the following track list:

1. "Inch'Allah"
2. "Je vous offre"
3. "Sont-ce vos bijoux?"

== Versions ==
The song became a huge hit for Adamo in the French version, staying in the French Hit Parade for 8 months. It remains his best-known song, along with "Tombe la neige".

In 1993, Adamo recorded a new self-censored version of this song, where references to trembling children in Israel and especially the Shoah disappeared, replaced by a more neutral discourse.

He recorded the song with Amália Rodrigues, and it entered her repertoire as well. Adamo recorded versions of the song in English, Italian and other languages.

He had a comeback with the song in 2008, recorded as a duet with Calogero on Adamo's album Le Bal des gens bien.

== Charts ==
Chart (1967–1968)	Peak position
Austria (Ö3 Austria Top 40)	11
Belgium (Ultratop 50 Flanders)	4
Belgium (Ultratop 50 Wallonia)	1
France	1
Italy (Musica e dischi)	9
Netherlands (Dutch Top 40)	35
Spain (AFYVE)	4
West Germany (GfK)	18
