= Mapping the World of Women's Information Services =

Online Woman Database Libraries

Mapping the World of Women's Information Services is an online database of women's information centres, libraries and archives. It was developed in 1998 in the Netherlands by the International Information Centre and Archives for the Women's Movement (IIAV) in collaboration with the Royal Tropical Institute, and Oxfam, GB, with a grant from UNESCO. Presently Atria, institute on gender equality and women's history, the successor of the IIAV, maintains the database.

It contains almost 600 women's information centres from over 130 countries and can be accessed through the Atria website.

== Finding relevant sources of women's information ==
The Mapping the World database is a tool for finding sources of women's information, that are open to the public. The centers provide the information, which includes a description of the center, highlights in their collections, and contact information. Many of the centers listed in the database have resources such as books, periodicals, and photos, to be viewed and used on site at the center, or to be searched on line through their website.

== Women's information services ==
Women have collected and disseminated information for hundreds of years, but it is only from the early 20th century that centres have been developed for the specific purpose of collecting and documenting what has come to be known as women's information. Women's information envelops a wide spectrum of material, cultural, political and educational issues.

Women's information centres give women access to information that affects them. In the past fifty years, influenced by the worldwide women's movement, collections have become more established and have developed their own professional instruments (for example the Women's Thesaurus, an instrument developed to index women's information).

Women's information services include:

- International, national and local women's information services
- Women's documentation and research centres connected to universities
- Gender specific information sections in governmental organisations, and
- Resource centres in which, among others, women's information is collected,
- Or, where the development of the women's movement is still in its early stages, such as in newly democratic countries, or in countries where war has destabilised development, a women's magazine, a radio or TV programme are often ‘focal point' for women's information, accessible to the public.

== Targetgroup ==
The database is a resource for anyone looking for print, on line, photographic, audio-visual, or other resources about women. Sources of women's information are to be found in over 50 languages, covering hundreds of relevant subjects, from more than 130 countries. Targetusers are women and women's organizations, policymakers, decision-makers and general information services.
