= Le Plat Pays =

1962 song by Jacques Brel

- 7" vinyl single cover

Song by Jacques Brel

from the album Les Bourgeois
- Released: 1962
- Recorded: March 6, 1962
- Genre: Chanson
- Length: 2:37
- Label: Barclay
- Songwriter: Jacques Brel

"Le Plat Pays" (Translation: 'The Flat Country') is a French-language song by Belgian singer Jacques Brel about his home country. It also exists in a Dutch-language version as "Mijn vlakke land" ('My Flat Country'), also performed by him. The French lyrics are by Jacques Brel, the Dutch lyrics by Ernst van Altena.

== Concept ==
Recorded on 6 March 1962, the song describes the North Sea as the final wasteland of Belgium's borders, then mentions the mist, the winds from all corners and cathedrals as "the only mountains" his country has. Brel sees the sky as "so low" that "a canal gets lost", and "so gray", that "a canal would hang itself". The low brooding sky brings his people humility. Yet, despite the grey skies and rain he still declares his country as "his". The flat country referred to in the song is West Flanders, the region in Belgium from which his family originated. It is a region with many open fields and few trees. Because this landscape is rather typical not only of the West Flanders, but of large swathes of the Low Countries, the Dutch version of the song is popular in the Netherlands. He also refers to the Flemish seasonal workers who left their farms every winter to work in the textile mills of Northern France from November to May. (Les fils de novembre qui nous reviennent en mai)

== In popular culture ==
The success encountered in Paris by his Swiss mentor friend Jean Villard' "La Venoge", about a little-known Swiss river located entirely within the canton Vaud, inspired and encouraged him to write the song.

Valencian singer Ovidi Montllor wrote a largely modified version, "El Meu Poble Alcoi" ("My Hometown Alcoi"), which he dedicated to the city where he was born and grown up.

The song was also referenced in the original French-language version of Asterix in Belgium, where the Belgian leader tells Asterix, Obelix and Vitalstatistix that "in his flat country oppidums are the only mountains."

The Italian singer and author Herbert Pagani wrote and interpreted a cover titled "La Lombardia".
