= La Venoge (poem) =

Poem by Jean Villard

"La Venoge" is a poem written by Jean Villard, proprietor of the cabaret "Chez Gilles", who also wrote the popular song Les trois cloches. It refers to the River Venoge that flows in the Canton of Vaud, Switzerland to Lake Léman. The poem, which is a vibrant and humorous homage to the author's canton, inspired Jacques Brel for his famous song Le Plat Pays (see underneath Quote).

Many French Swiss, jokingly consider it as a kind of national anthem representing best their "minority entity" feelings towards the German Swiss vast majority, (see and Röstigraben): "La Venoge" being the only significant river in canton of Vaud contributing to the "French" Rhône basin, all others flowing through the German Swiss Area into the Rhine River.

== Quote ==
"C'est là que Jacques Brel avait entendu notre homme dire ce poème. Il avoua à Gilles – qu’il considérait comme son maître – avoir osé écrire «Le Plat Pays» au vu de l’étonnant succès que rencontrait – auprès des Parisiens – cet hymne à une rivière suisse inconnue!"

Translation: That's where (Gilles' Cabaret) Jacques Brel had heard our man recite his poem. He confided to Gilles – whom he considered as being his Master – that he got up courage to write «Le Plat Pays» in light of the stunning success with the Parisian audience of this hymn to an unknown Swiss river!

== See also ==
- Francophone literature
- Swiss literature
