= La Nuit (song) =

1964 single by Adamo

- 7" vinyl French single cover

Single by Salvatore Adamo

from the album Adamo Volume 2
- Language: French
- A-side: "La Nuit"
- B-side: "Mauvais Garçon"
- Released: 1964
- Recorded: 1964
- Label: La Voix de son Maître
- Songwriter: Salvatore Adamo

"La Nuit" (The Night) is a 1964 song by Belgian singer and composer of Italian ancestry Salvatore Adamo and one of his definitive songs besides "Tombe la neige" and "Inch'Allah". He simultaneously released an Italian language version as well under the title "La notte" and a Spanish version as "La noche". The French language "La Nuit" reached number 3 on the Belgian singles chart in 1964. In Spain, the song was interpreted by Raphael.

== Track listing ==
Various single releases included different B-side tracks. One release included "Mauvais garçon" as a B-side and another "Le barbu sans barbe". The Belgian release included four tracks, "La Nuit", "Mauvais garçon", "Elle.." and "Petit Camarade".

== Charts ==
Chart (1965–66)	Peak position
Argentina (CAPIF)	6
Belgium (Ultratop 50 Flanders)	3
Belgium (Ultratop 50 Wallonia)	1
France (IFOP)	1
Italy (Musica e dischi)	2
Netherlands (Dutch Top 40)	18

== Other versions ==
Le Grand Orchestre de Paul Mauriat recorded an instrumental version of the song, making it the opening track of his album Paul Mauriat Plays Standards.

Adamo re-released the song in 1993 with a new orchestra arrangement as part of his compilation album 30 ans featuring rearrangements of his biggest hits.

In 2008, Adamo performed it as a duo with Jeanne Cherhal and with Nolwenn Leroy in 2011. In 2013, he performed it as a duo with David Madi, a contestant and eventual winner of The Voice Belgique in season 2.

In 2010, the Italian female rock band Le Rivoltelle, for their debut single, chose to reinterpret the Italian version of Adamo's song. The cover recalls the atmosphere of the original, but is characterized by the very personal rock style with the typical imprint of Italian ska.

The song has been covered in many languages by a number of artists.
