= Vous permettez, Monsieur? =

1963 single by Adamo

- 1963 French single cover

Single by Salvatore Adamo

from the album Adamo
- Language: French
- B-side: "Dans le vert de ses yeux"
- Released: November 1963
- Length: 3:00
- Label: La Voix de son Maître (His Master's Voice / EMI)
- Songwriter(s): Salvatore Adamo

Salvatore Adamo singles chronology
"Tombe la neige" (1963)	"Vous permettez, Monsieur?" (1963)	"Quand les roses" (1964)

"Vous permettez, Monsieur?" is a song by Italian-Belgian singer, Salvatore Adamo. The song topped the Tijd Voor Teenagers Top 10 chart for eleven weeks and ended up being the best-selling single of the year in the Netherlands by the close of 1964, with over 200,000 copies sold. It also achieved the highest ranking on the annual points-based list.

The lyrics narrate a story where a young man wishes to take a girl to a party and, in accordance with tradition, seeks her father's permission. He assures the father that he will conduct himself properly, just as the father did before his own marriage.

Adamo's rendition of this song on the show Voor de vuist weg, accompanied by his much younger brother and sisters, left a lasting impression on the audience.

== Track list ==
No.	Title	Writer(s)	Length
1.	"Vous permettez, Monsieur?"	Adamo	3:00
2.	"Ballade à la pluie"	Adamo	3:10
3.	"Dans le vert de ses yeux"	Adamo	3:00
4.	"Ma tête"	Adamo	2:40

== Charts ==
Chart (1963–1965)	Peak position
Belgium (Ultratop 50 Flanders)	1
Belgium (Ultratop 50 Wallonia)	1
France (IFOP)	1
Switzerland (Swiss Hitparade)	13
Netherlands (Dutch Top 40)	1
West Germany (Media Control)	34
