= Ernst van Altena =

Dutch poet (1933–1999)

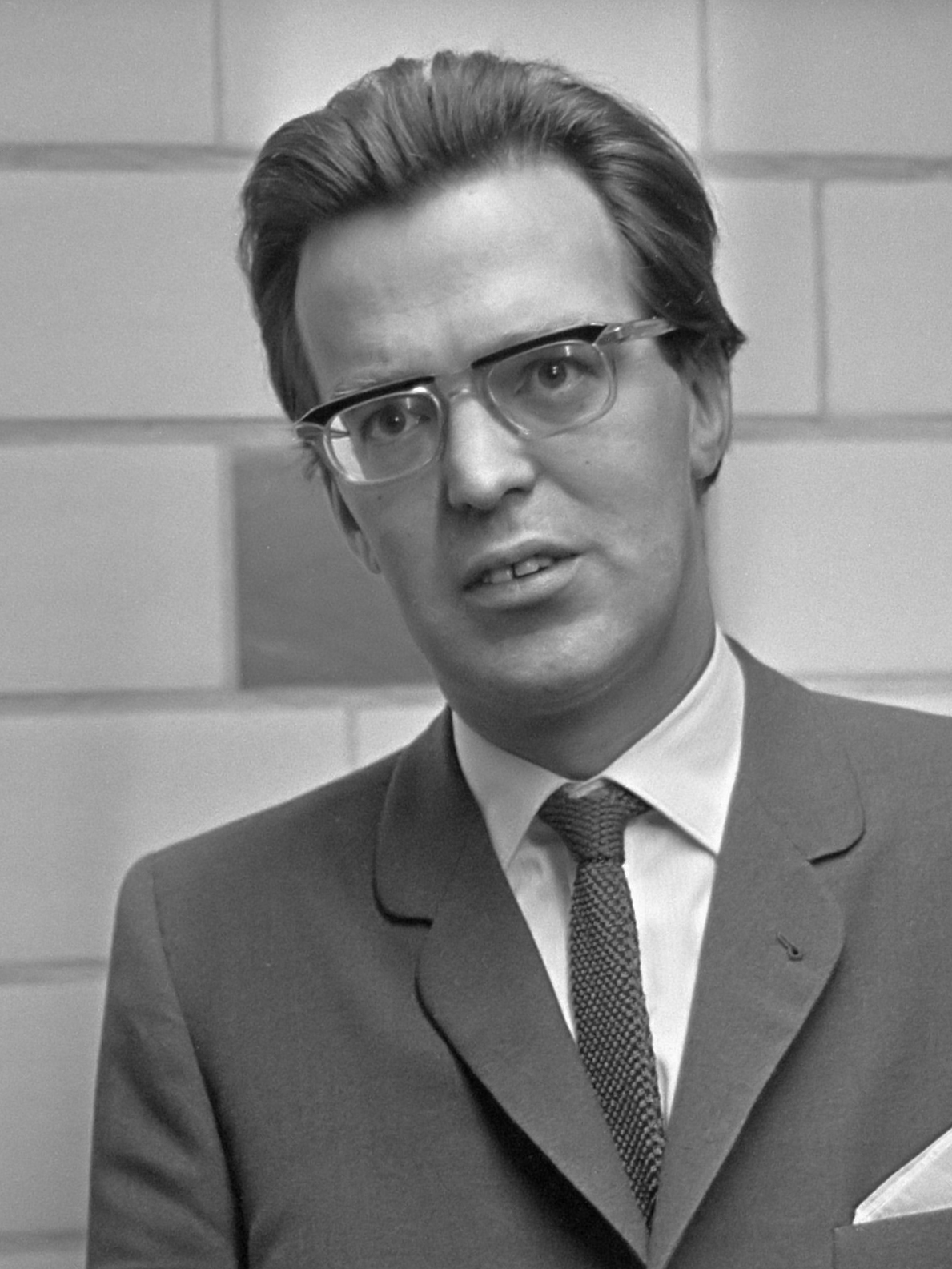
- van Altena in 1968
- Born: 11 December 1933; Amsterdam
- Died: 15 June 1999 (aged 65); Landsmeer

Ernst Rudolf van Altena (11 December 1933 – 15 June 1999) was a Dutch poet, writer and translator. He was best known for his translations of chansons by Jacques Brel.
