= Salvatore Adamo =

Belgian musician

Officer Adamo
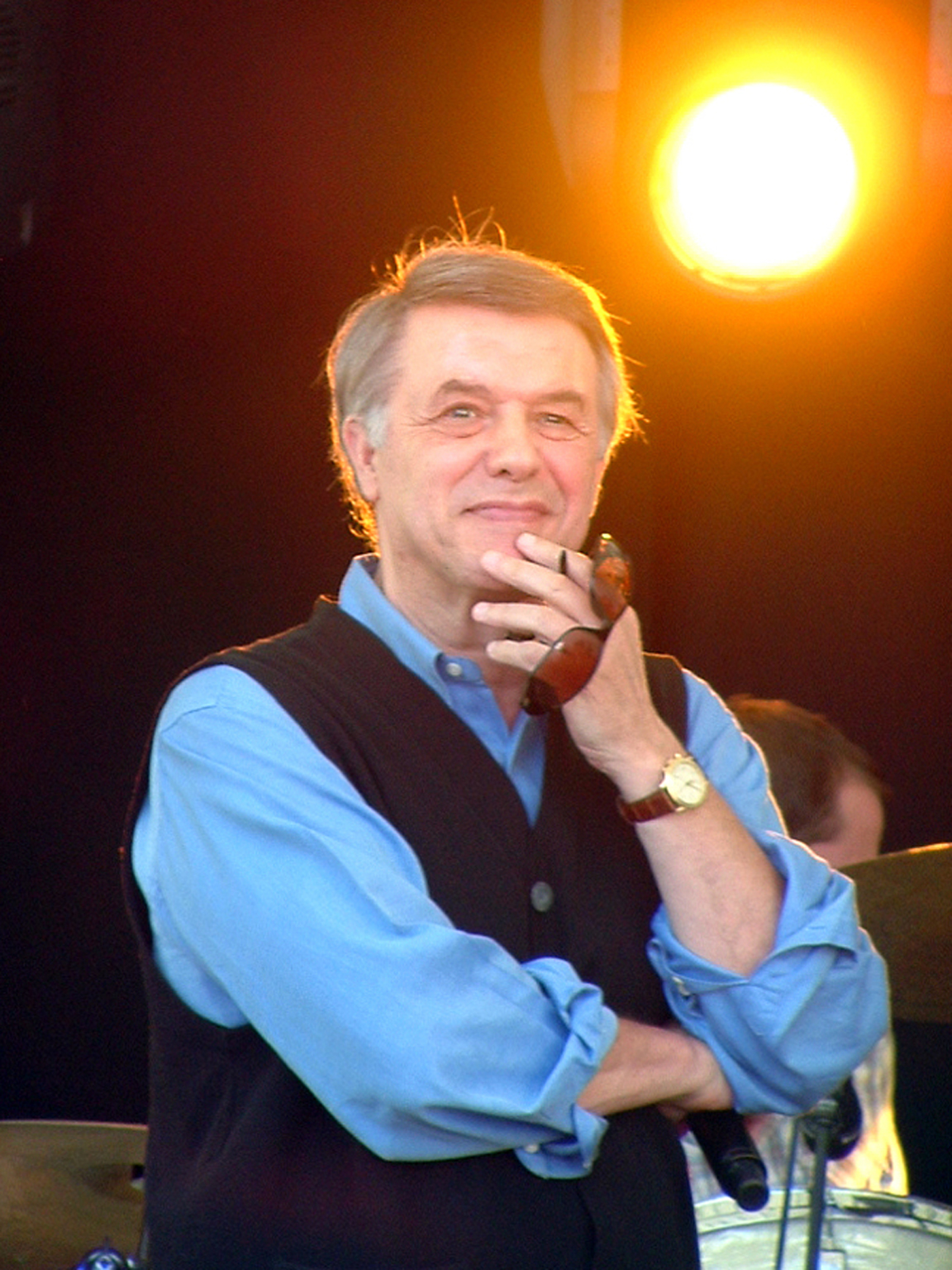
- Salvatore Adamo in France, 2007
- Born: 1 November 1943 (age 83); Comiso, Sicily, Italy
- Occupations: Musician; singer; composer
- Years active: 1963–present
- Parents: Antonio Adamo (father); Concetta Adamo (mother)
- Musical career
- Genres: Chanson; pop; Nueva ola
- Instruments: Vocals; guitar
- Works: Discography
- Labels: His Master's Voice; EMI; Pathé; Odeon; Hispavox; Polydor
- Website: adamosalvatore.fr

Salvatore Adamo (November 1, 1943) is a Belgian-Italian musician, singer, and composer, who is known for his romantic ballads. Adamo was born in Comiso, Sicily, Italy, and has lived in Belgium since the age of three, which is why he has dual citizenship. By the second half of the sixties, Adamo had become the world's second best-selling musician after The Beatles. Through his career, he sold more than 80 million copies worldwide, making him the best-selling Belgian artist of all time, and one of the most commercially successful musicians in the world.

He first gained popularity throughout Europe and later in the Middle East, Latin America, Japan, and the United States. Adamo mainly performs in French but has also sung in Italian, Dutch, English, German, Spanish, Japanese, and Turkish. "Tombe la neige", "La nuit", "Vous permettez, Monsieur?", "Inch'Allah" and "Petit bonheur" remain his best known songs. His songs have also been interpreted by countless artists worldwide. For instance "Yuki Ga Furu", the Japanese version of "Tombe la neige" has been covered by more than 500 artists, making it by far the most popular Japanese Christmas song, ahead of Bing Crosby's "White Christmas".

Since 2001 Adamo holds the Belgian noble title of Ridder, similar to the English title of "Knight". He became an officer of the French Légion d'honneur in 2005 and a Commander in the Order of the Star of Italy in 2015. He was also awarded the Order of the Rising Sun in 2016 for his influence on Japanese popular music.

== Early life ==
The father of Adamo, Antonio, emigrated to Belgium in February 1947 to work as a colliery worker in the mines of Marcinelle. Four months later his wife, Concetta, and their son, Salvatore, joined him in the town of Ghlin, before moving to Jemappes (Mons).

In 1956, Salvatore was bedridden for a year with meningitis.

Salvatore's parents did not want their son to become a miner, so he went to a Catholic school run by the Frères des Ecoles Chrétiennes. By 1960, the family of Antonio and Concetta Adamo had seven children overall. Salvatore was a dedicated student at school and distinguished himself in music and the arts.

== Career ==
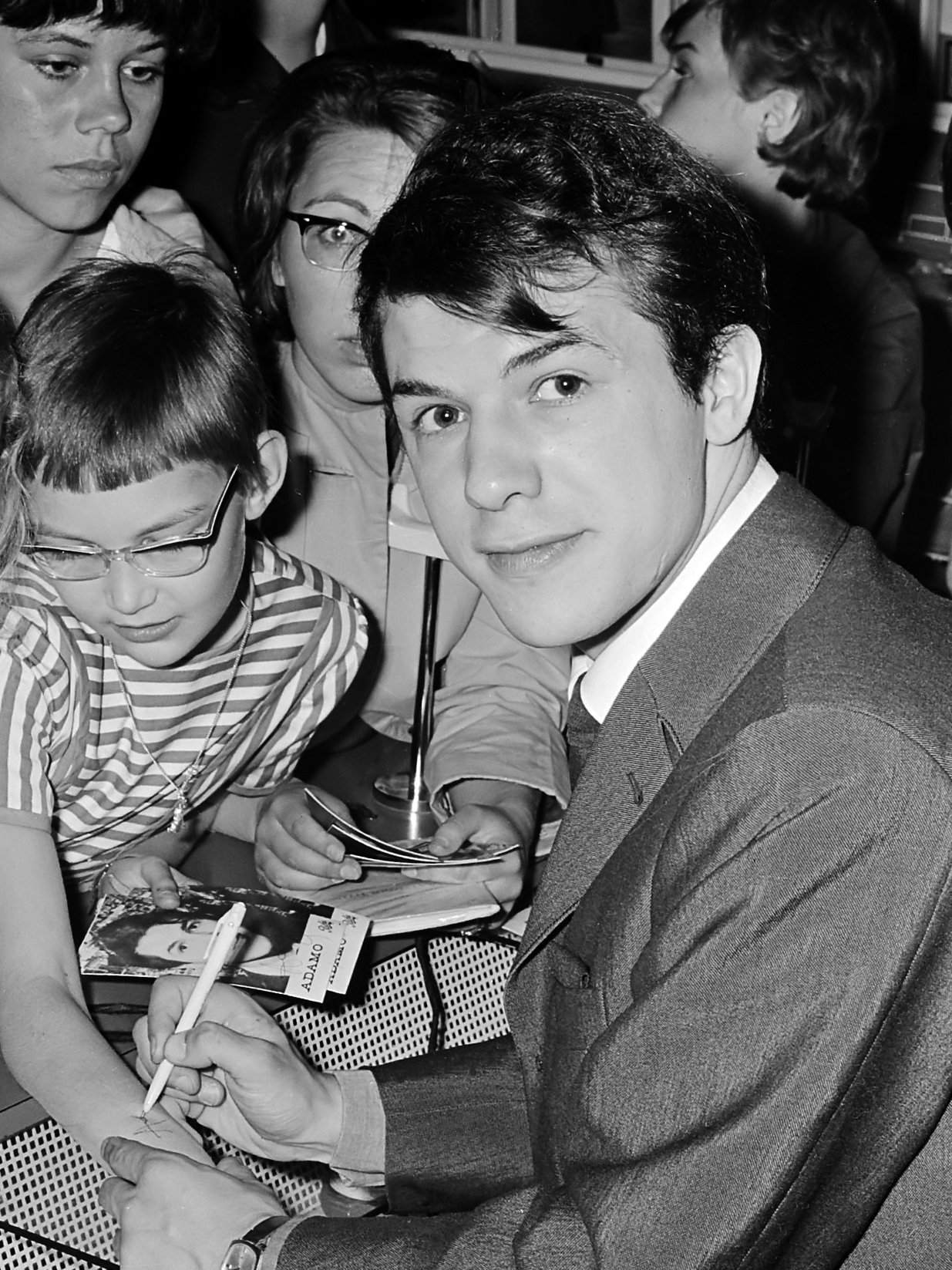
Salvatore Adamo, 1964

Adamo's early influences were the poetry of Victor Hugo and Jacques Prévert, the music of Jacques Brel and French singer-songwriters like Georges Brassens and Charles Aznavour, and the Italian canzonette. He started singing and composing his own songs from an early age. His debut was in a Radio Luxembourg competition, where he participated as singer and composer of the song "Si j'osais" ("If I dared"), winning the competition's final held in Paris on 14 February 1960.

Adamo's first hit was "Sans toi, ma mie", in 1963, from his debut album 63/64. He followed this with a series of hits, the most famous being "Tombe la neige" ("The snow falls") in 1963, "La nuit" ("The Night") in 1964, "Mes mains sur tes hanches" ("My hands on your hips") in 1965 and "Inch'Allah" in 1967. The self-penned "Petit bonheur" ("Little Happiness") sold over one million copies by April 1970, and was awarded a gold disc.

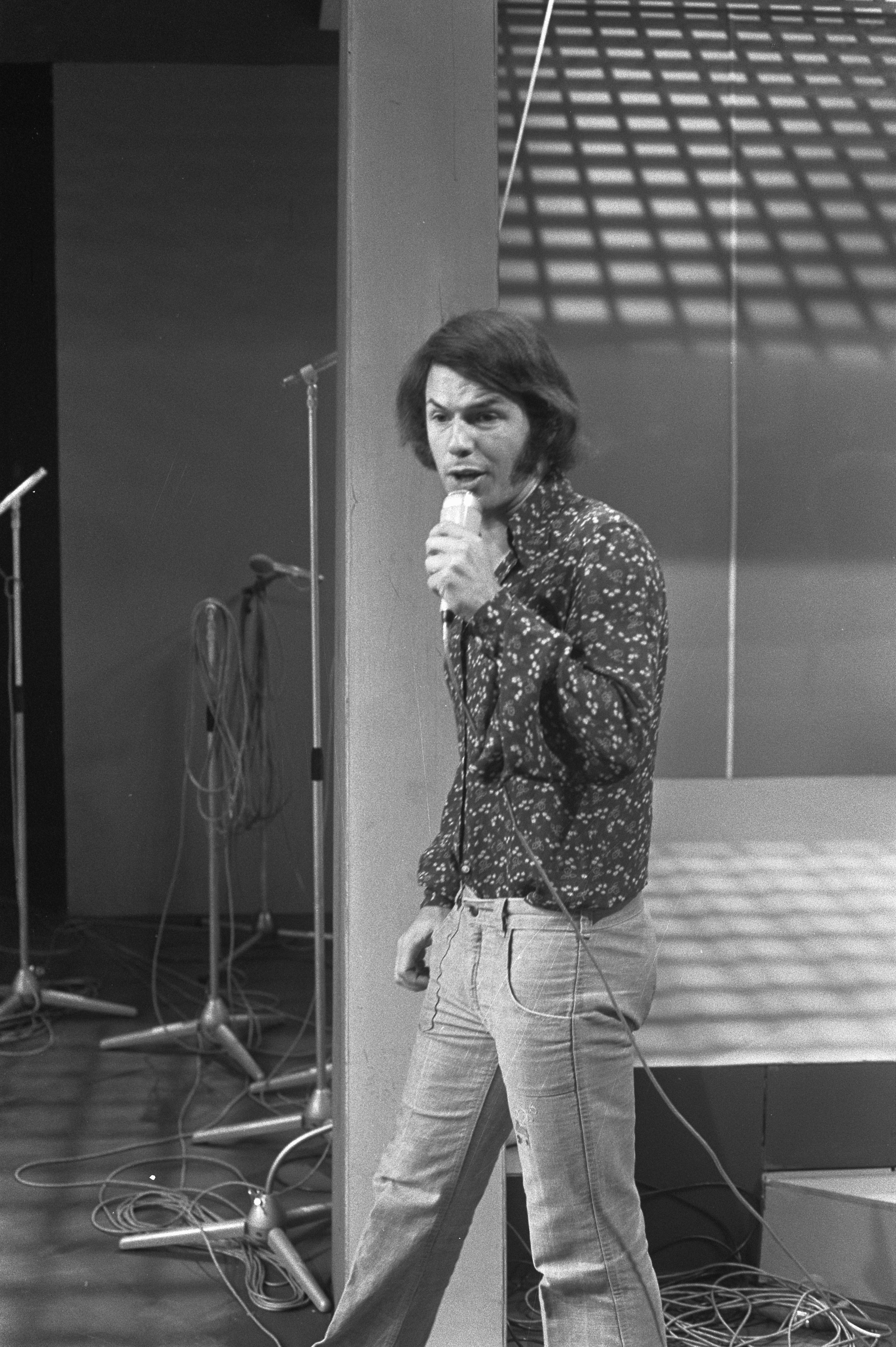
Adamo in a 1972 TV show

Adamo has sold over 80 million copies of recordings worldwide. He has recorded in many languages and, besides France and Belgium, had hits in Italy, the Netherlands, Germany, Spain, Portugal, Turkey and also in Japan, where he toured repeatedly. He has had hits and toured also in Latin America and throughout the Middle East.

In Chile, the audience awarded him an appreciation prize known as the "Antorcha" (Gold and Silver Torch) at the "Festival de Viña del Mar" held yearly in the "Quinta Vergara", at the seaside resort of Viña del Mar, where he once had to sing in three different, sold-out venues in the same night. In the 1980s, Adamo's career faltered, as the style of his music was no longer fashionable. Since the 1990s, however, and on the crest of a nostalgia wave, he has successfully resumed composing, issuing records and touring, starting with a full season at the Casino de Paris venue in April 1990.

In 2003, he released the album Zanzibar, in collaboration with his friend the singer Arno, whose repertoire already included a famous cover of the song Les Filles du Bord de Mer. During a 2004 tour, Adamo was admitted to a Paris hospital because he had become unwell during a performance. Consequently, a number of performances were cancelled. In the following years, however, he would continue to perform worldwide in French-speaking countries such as Belgium, France, Canada, Switzerland, but also in Spain, Portugal, Greece, Romania, Russia, and Japan. Even later in life, Adamo proved to still have a lot of fans in Latin America. In 2018, during a tour, 50,000 people gathered at Santiago airport in Chile to see their idol.

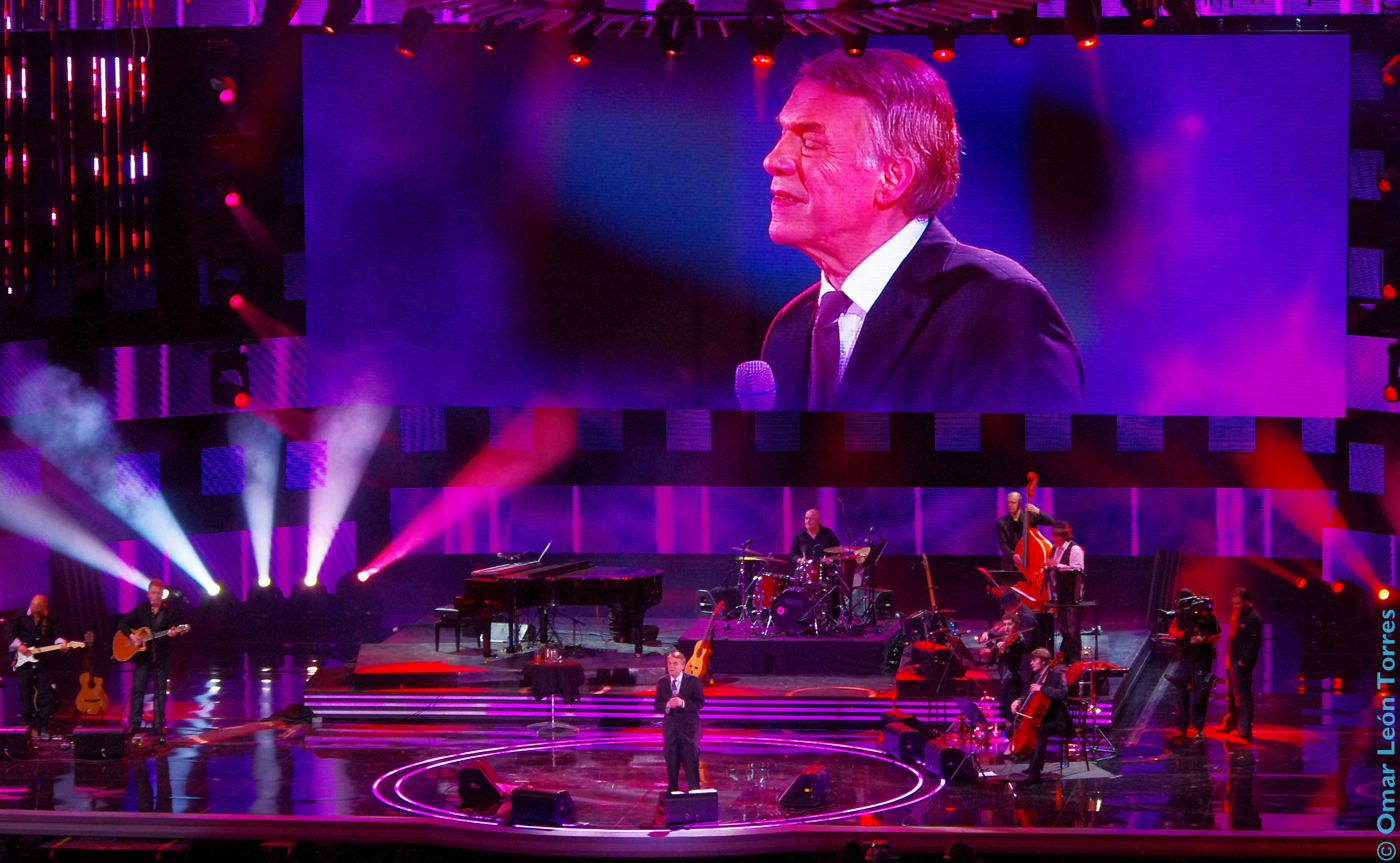
Adamo performing in 2012

In 2023, he produced an album of French adaptations of English language hits by Elton John, Pearl Jam and 10cc. The album is entitled In French Please! A concert tour in 2023, celebrating his 60 year career was jeopardized due to the ongoing health problems of the 79-year-old Adamo. In the end, the first concerts went ahead as planned.

== Filmography ==
Adamo acted in a few French-language movies. He made his film debut in Les Arnaud (1967), which starred Bourvil. He acted in L'ardoise (1970) of Claude Bernard-Aubert, together with Michel Constantin and Jess Hahn. Adamo himself co-wrote, directed and acted in L'île au Coquelicot (1972).

Years later, he reappeared in the series La Légende de Croc-Blanc (1992) and in the movie Laisse tes mains sur mes hanches (2003). Adamo acted as himself in Lili David (2012) and Les Chamois (2017).

== In popular culture ==
Amália Rodrigues recorded "Inch'Allah" in French. More than five hundred different versions of his chanson "Tombe la neige", one of his many international hits worldwide, exist. It has been covered in Bulgarian, Turkish ("Her Yerde Kar Var"), Japanese, Portuguese, Spanish, Italian and Chinese (Cantopop).

== Honours and awards ==
In 2001, Adamo was raised into the Belgian nobility (with motto Humblement mais dignement) by King Albert II and given for life the Belgian noble title Ridder. He was appointed an Officer of the Belgian Order of the Crown in 2002. In 2014, Adamo was honored at Victoires de la Musique in France. For his 38 visits to Japan and over 500 concerts, his influence on Japanese popular music, and his work as UNICEF goodwill ambassador, Adamo was honored Order of the Rising Sun in 2016.

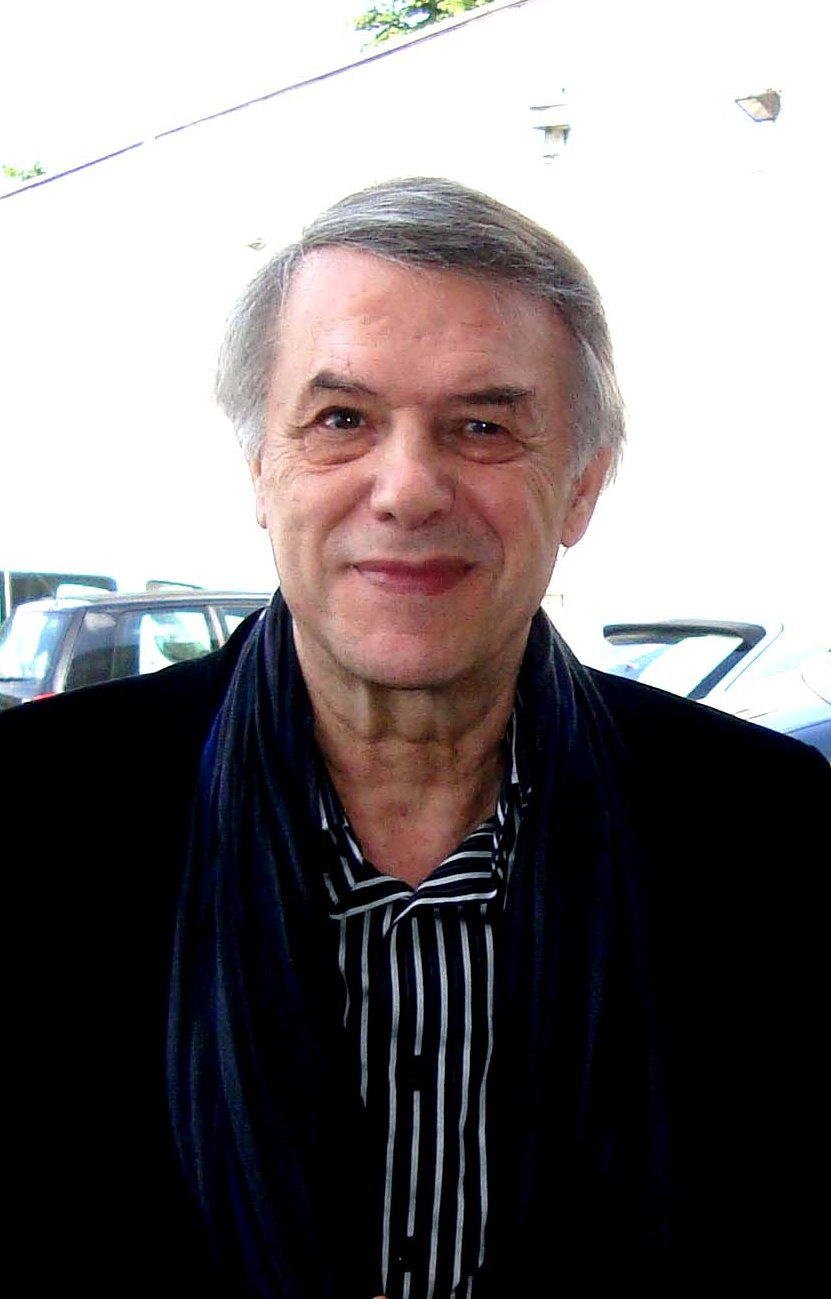
Salvatore Adamo in 2011

=== Orders ===
- Commandeur de l'Ordre des Arts et des Lettres (France, 1987)
- Knight of the Order of the Crown (Belgium, 1991)
- Officer of the Order of the Crown (Belgium, 2002)
- Officer of the Legion of Honour (France, 2005)
- Commander of the Order of the Star of Italy (Italy, 2015)
- Commandeur de le Mérite wallon (fr) (Wallonia, Belgium, 2015)
- Member 4th Class (Gold Rays with Rosette) of the Order of the Rising Sun (Japan, 2016)

=== Awards ===
- Dutch Edison Award: 1964 (album Vous Permettez Monsieur?)
- French Miden trophy: 1965, 1966, 1967
- Zamu Music Award for his entire career: 2002
- Grand Prix international de poésie francophone by Société des poètes et artistes de France: 2010
- Victoires de la Musique Lifetime achievement award: 2014
- Octaves de la Musique (fr) Lifetime achievement award: 2014
- Grands prix SACEM: 2017
- D6bels Music Awards (fr) Prix d'Honneur: 2018
- Premio Tenco: 2018
- Vagonate di vinile award of the Associazione Vinile Italiana: 2018
- SABAM Lifetime achievement award: 2023
- Music Industry Awards Lifetime achievement award: 2025

=== Honours ===
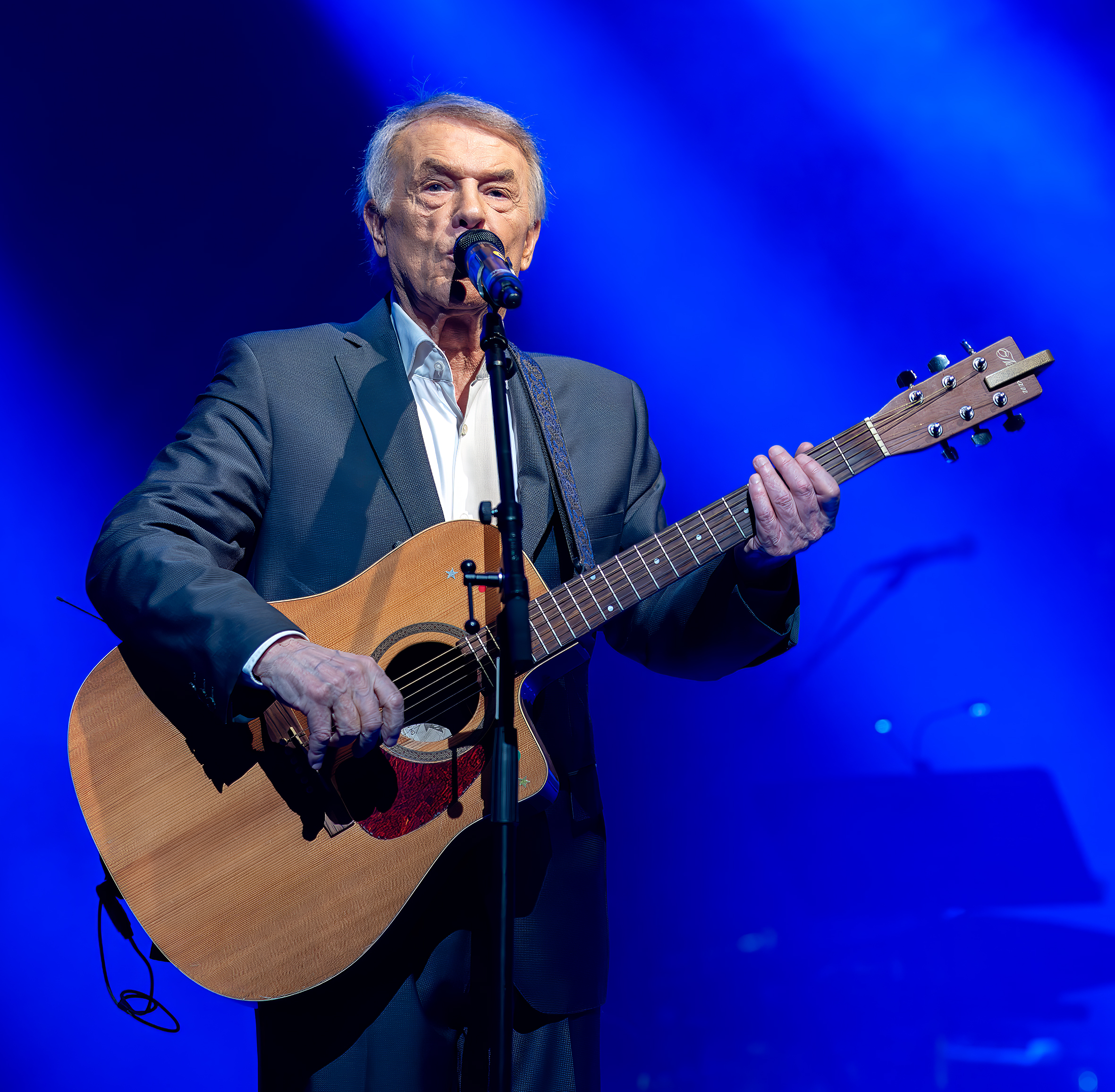
Adamo performing in 2024

- Honorary citizen of Jemappes, Belgium: 1966
- Ville de Jemappes Silver Medal: 1973
- UNICEF ambassador: 1993
- Created Knight Adamo by Royal Decree, with devise Humbly but with dignity: 2001
- Honorary citizen of Montreal, Canada: 2002
- Honorary citizen of Mons, Belgium: 2002
- Honorary citizen of Comiso, Italy: 2002
- Bronze Zinneke: 2003
- Honorary citizen of Paris, France: 2005
- Honorary citizen of Uccle, Belgium: 2010
- Radio 2 Hall of Fame: 2014
- Doctorat honoris causa University of Mons: 2014

== Personal life ==
At the height of his stardom, his father died by drowning on 7 August 1966. At the end of the 1960s, Adamo married Nicole Durant. Their children were Anthony (born in 1969), Amélie (1980) and Benjamin (1981). His younger sister Délizia was also a recording artist. He wrote a number of songs for his sister, including her debut hit "Prends le chien" in 1974. She also joined him in his tour in 1975. He has two granddaughters.

In 1984, Adamo had heart problems which necessitated a heart bypass operation and a temporary though total withdrawal from work. Since 1993, he has been an honorary UNICEF ambassador from Belgium and, in this capacity, has visited countries such as Vietnam, Lebanon, Bosnia and Herzegovina, Kosovo, Afghanistan and others. In 2004, health problems forced him to cancel a scheduled tour but, since 2007, he started touring again.

== Trivia ==
- In Dolce Paola, he sang about Paola, the later queen of Belgium. In the press, rumors spread that Adamo had an affair with the princess. He later received a request from Prince Philippe to also compose a song for his wife Mathilde, the Duchess of Brabant.
- Since 1994, there has been a Dutch tulip named Adamo.
- Vous permettez, monsieur? was at No 1 on the 1964 annual list.
- In the commune of Sin-le-Noble in France, there is a Rue Salvatore Adamo.

== Discography ==
=== Studio albums ===
- 1962 : Sans Toi Ma mie (Pathé-Marconi Records – France)
- 1963 : Chansons non-commerciales (Belgium)
- 1964 : Tombe la neige
- 1964 : Vous Permettez Monsieur (Canada)
- 1964 : Mes 21 ans (Canada)
- 1965 : La Nuit, vol. 2
- 1967 : Notre roman (Canada)
- 1967 : Ton nom (Canada)
- 1968 : J'ai tant de rêves dans mes bagages
- 1968 : Chansons pour l'été (Canada)
- 1969 : Petit Bonheur
- 1971 : Chansons de mes seize ans (Rerelease Emidisc)
- 1972 : Quand tu reviendras
- 1973 : A ceux qui rêvent encore
- 1975 : Mademoiselle attendez (Canada) (with 7 unpublished titles in France)
- 1975 : Jusqu'à l'amour
- 1976 : Voyage jusqu'à toi
- 1977 : Et on chantait
- 1979 : Pauvre Liberté
- 1981 : " Printemps sous la neige" (Japan, disques "Victor" with 6 unpublished titles in France)
- 1982 : Puzzle
- 1986 : Autre chose (Double album Belgium RCA Ariola/Charles TALAR)
- 1987 : Avec des si
- 1989 : Sur la route des étoiles
- 1992 : Rêveur de fond
- 1995 : La Vie comme elle passe
- 1997 : Regards
- 2001 : Par les temps qui courent
- 2003 : Zanzibar
- 2007 : La Part de l'ange
- 2008 : Le Bal des gens bien (Remake of Adamo songs as duos with 18 other singers)
- 2010 : De toi à moi
- 2012 : La grande roue
- 2014 : Adamo chante Bécaud
- 2016 : L'Amour n'a jamais tort
- 2018 : Si vous saviez...
- 2023 : In French Please!

=== Albums (other languages) ===
In German

- 1988 : Seine Grossen Erfolge
- 1999 : Single Hits
- 2003 : So Bin Ich, Das Beste
- 2011 : All the Best

Spanish

- 1981 : Aquellas manos en tu cintura
- 1986 : Buscador de oro
- 1990 : Las mejores canciones
- 1998 : Simplemente lo mejor
- 2003 : Lo mejor de...48 – Grandes éxitos
- 2004 : En Chile – Live
- 2004 : 24 Grandes éxitos en castellano
- 2005 : Mis manos en tu cintura
- 2006 : Voces del amor
- 2011 : 30 Grandes de

Turkish

- 1964 : ‘’Her yerde kar var’’

=== Compilation albums ===
- 1962: Adamo, (25 cm, Polydor)
- 1967: 'Hits of Adamo' (hits from 1963, 1964, 1965 and 1966 – Orchestra conducted by O.Saintal and A. Goraguer, English sleeve note EMI LP 3601)
- 1974: Los Hits de Adamo en Castellano-EMI/Odeon (Greatest hits in Spanish)
- 1978: Les chansons d'où je viens (CBS, new arrangements by Roger Loubet and Franck Fiévez – with Orchestre philharmonique de Toulouse)
- 1993: 30 ans (20 great songs, new recordings CARRERE/WEA)
- 1993: Paroles et musique (1979/1991) (AMC Belgium, unreleased titles)
- 2002: Mes plus belles chansons d'amour (Double CD Atoll Sony 1979/1994 with unreleased titles)
- 2002: Les Mots de l'âme (compilation – Long Box 3 CDs EMI)
- 2003: C'est ma vie: L'Intégrale 1963/1975 (compilation – first 12 albums, EMI)
- 2003: Anthologie C'est ma vie (Long Box 3 CDs EMI (with previously unreleased titles and foreign versions)
- 2005: Platinum Collection (compilation – 3 CD collection, EMI, 2 unreleased tracks)
- 2019: 1962-1975 (8 CD PIAS)

In Italian

- 1996: Canto L'Amore
- 1998: I Successi di Adamo
- 1998: I Successi di Adamo Volume 2
- 2005: Studio Collection

=== Live albums ===
- 1965 : Adamo à l'Olympia
- 1967 : Olympia 67
- 1968 : A la place des arts de Montréal (Canada)
- 1969 : Olympia 69
- 1969 : Adamo in Japan live
- 1970 : Adamo in Deutschland: Live-Konzert aus der Philharmonie in Berlin (Double album)
- 1971 : Olympia 71
- 1972 : Live in Japan 72
- 1974 : Live in Japan 74
- 1977 : Olympia 77 (CBS)
- 1981 : Live au Théâtre des Champs-Élysées 80 (Teldec Germany Import EMI) (Double album)
- 1982 : Japan concert 81 (disques Victor double album with le Choral Echo and String Orchestra Arrangements Gérard Sabbe)
- 1984 : Japan Best sélection (studio remix of 20 live tracks Concert 81) (Rereleased 1990 and 1992 in France 16 titles – Pomme Music Sony)
- 1992 : Live in Japan (EMI Toshiba Japan) (CD and DVD with different tracks at times)
- 1992 : A l'Olympia – Collection Or (Sony International) (Olympia '77 + 4 titles in studio)
- 1994 : C'est ma vie. Le meilleur d'Adamo en public (At Théâtre Royal de Mons) (Double CD Flarenasch Carrère, 34 titles)
- 1994 : Symphonic'Adamo Live à Liège on 22 Avril 1994) (SA Music)
- 1994 : C'est Ma Vie – Enregistrement public (Flarenasch Carrère France) ("Les meilleurs moments" 18 titles)
- 1998 : Best Of – Le meilleur En Public (Wagram France)
- 2002 : A l'Olympia (Wagram France 1995 / 2002)
- 2004 : Un soir au Zanzibar (En public au Cirque Royal de Bruxelles) (Double CD and DVD Polydor)
- 2004 : En Vivo, Estadio Chile 2003 (Double album EMI in Spanish live – EMI Chili)

=== Singles ===
(Selective)

- 1963: "Tombe la neige"
- 1963: "Sans toi mamie"
- 1963: "Amour perdu"
- 1963: "N'est-ce pas merveileux?"
- 1964: "Vous permettez, Monsieur ?"
- 1964: "La Nuit"
- 1964: "Quand les roses"
- 1964: "Si jamais"
- 1965: "Dolce Paola"
- 1965: "Les Filles du bord de mer"
- 1965: "Elle..."
- 1965: "Mes mains sur tes hanches"
- 1965: "Viens ma brune"
- 1965: "J'aime"
- 1965: "Comme toujours"
- 1966: "Ton Nom"
- 1966: "Une meche de cheveux"
- 1966: "Tenez-vous bien"
- 1967: "Une larme aux nuages"
- 1967: "Inch'Allah"
- 1967: "Ensemble"
- 1967: "L'amour te ressemble"
- 1967: "Notre roman"
- 1967: "Le néon"
- 1967: "Une larme aux nuages"
- 1968: "F... comme femme"
- 1968: "Le ruisseau de mon enfance"
- 1968: "Et sur la mer..."
- 1968: "Pauvre Verlaine"
- 1968: "La valse d'été"
- 1968: "J'ai tant de rêves dans mes bagages"
- 1969: "À demain sur la lune"
- 1969: "Petit bonheur"
- 1969: "Les gratte-ciel"
- 1970: "Va mon bateau"
- 1970: "Les belles dames"
- 1970: "Si le ciel est amoureux de toi"
- 1970: "Les belles dames" / Die schönen Damen
- 1970: "Alors.. reviens mois"
- 1971: "J'avais oublié que les roses sont roses"
- 1971: "Caresse"
- 1971: "Et t'oublier"
- 1971: "A demain sur la lune"
- 1971: "Sois heureuse rose"
- 1972: "Femme aux yeux d'amour"
- 1972: "Quand tu reviendras"
- 1972: "Mon amour, sors de chez toi"
- 1973: "Crazy Lue"
- 1973: "Gwendolina"
- 1973: "Rosalie, c'est la vie"
- 1973: "Marie la Mer"
- 1975: "C'est ma vie"
- 1975: "Prête-moi une chanson"
- 1976: "Voyage jusqu'à toi"
- 1976: "J'ai trouvé un été"
- 1980: "Et on chantait"
- 1980: "C'est pas legal"
- 2013: "Des belles personnes"

=== Singles (other languages) ===
In German

- 1964: "Gestatten Sie, Monsieur?" (Vous permettez, Monsieur ?)
- 1965: "Eine Locke von deinem Haar" (Une mèche de cheveux)
- 1966: "Das Wunder der Liebe" (Notre Roman)
- 1968: "Es geht eine Träne auf Reisen" (Une larme aux nuages)
- 1968: "Der Walzer des Sommers" (La valse d'été)
- 1969: "Du bist so wie die Liebe" (L'Amour te resemble)
- 1970: "Ein kleines Glück" (Petit bonheur)
- 1970: "Komm in mein Boot" (Va mon bateau)
- 1971: "Bis morgen – auf dem Mond mit dir (À demain sur la lune)
- 1971: "Gute Reise, schöne Rose" (Sois heureuse rose)
- 1971: "Ich muss wieder lernen, die Rosen zu sehen"
- 1972: "Liebe Tag für Tag"
- 1972: "Mädchen, wildes Mädchen" (Femme aux yeux d'amour)
- 1972: "Die alte Dame, der Sänger und die Spatzen" (La vieille, l'idole et les oiseaux)
- 1975: "Leih' mir eine Melodie" (Prête-moi une chanson)
- 1976: "Die Reise zu dir" (Voyage jusqu'à toi)
- 1976: "Der Sommer, den ich fand" (J'ai trouvé un été)
- 1977: "Der Hund"
- 1978: "Klopfe beim Glück an die Tür" (Frappe à la porte du bonheur)
- 1979: "Zweimal Glück und zurück"
- 1980: "...und dann ein Lied" (Et on chantait)
- 1980: "Unsere Hochzeit"
- 1981: "Du bist wieder da"
- 1985: "Kapitän, wohin fährt unser Boot"
- 1986: "Verborgenes Gold"
- 1988: "Es gibt noch Engel"
- 1988: "Que sera"
- 1994: "Nach allem, was war"

In Italian

- 1962: "Perché" / "Cara bambina"
- 1963: "Sei qui con me" / "Che funerale"
- 1963: "Perduto amore" / "Gridare il tuo nome"
- 1964: "Vous permettez, Monsieur ?" / "Non voglio nascondermi"
- 1964: "Cade la neve" / "Lascia dire"
- 1965: "Dolce Paola" / "Pazienza"
- 1965: "La notte" (La Nuit) / "Non sei tu"
- 1965: "Non mi tenere il broncio" /"Lei"
- 1966: "Amo" / "Al nostro amore"
- 1966: "Una ciocca di capelli" / "Se mai"
- 1966: "Al nostro amore"
- 1967: "Inch'Allah (se Dio vuole)" / "Insieme"
- 1967: "Domani sur la luna"
- 1968: "Affida una lacrima al vento" / "Fermare il tempo"
- 1968: "La tua storia è una favola" / "Un anno fa"
- 1968: "Tu somigli all'amore" / "Domani sulla luna"
- 1969: "Accanto a te l'estate" / "Piangi poeta"
- 1970: "Felicità" / "Noi"
- 1971: "Non aver paura" / "Il nostro amore"
- 1971: "Donna" / "Ma per te lo farei"
- 1972: "Bocca ciliegia pelle di pesca" / "Per un anno d'amore"
- 1973: "Donne dell'estate" / "Mi manchi tu"
- 1974: "E muore un amore" / "Ed ecco che vivo"
- 1975: "E la mia vita" / "La pace dei campi"
- 1976: "Un'estate per te" / "Ballo"
- 1981: "Cara Italia"
- 1987: "Mare" / "Lontano"

In Spanish

- 1964: "La noche" (La Nuit)
- 1965: "Permíteme Señor" / "Después"
- 1966: "Mis Manos en tu Cintura" / "Ella..."
- 1966: "L'amour e Ressemble" / "Nada Que Hacer"
- 1967: "Le Neón" / "Marcia Anche Tu"
- 1968: "Vals de Verano" / "Y Sobre el Mar"
- 1968: "Inch' Allah" / "Nuestra Novela"
- 1969: "El Arroyo de mi Infancia" / "Un Año Hará"
- 1974: "Marie La Mer" / "Sólo Una Mujer"
- 1975: "Los Campos en Paz" / "Es Mi Vida"

== DVDs ==
- 2003: Live in Japan 1992
- 2004: Un soir au Zanzibar (live)
- 2005: Salvatore Adamo en Chile
- 2020: En Concert 1976 (live)
- 2023: Salvatore Adamo : Documents TV (1963-1970)

== Publications ==
- Salvatore Adamo, Chansons racontées aux enfants (Hachette): 1969
- Le Charmeur d'Océans (preface by Raymond Devos – éditions Claude de la Lande): 1980
- Les Mots de l'Ame (éditions Anne Sigier): 1993
- Le Souvenir du Bonheur Est Encore du Bonheur (éditions Albin Michel): 2001
- À Ceux Qui Rêvent Encore (éditions Albin Michel): 2001

== Bibliography ==
- Salvatore Adamo by Yves Salgues, Paris 1975
- Recherches techniques sur la poésie de Salvatore Adamo by Maryse Tessonneau. Namur. 1985
- Adamo – C'est sa vie by Thierry Coljon, éditions du Félin (France), 2003
- Adamo 50 ans de succès by Thierry Coljon. Renaissance, 2013
- Salvatore Adamo, une Etoile pas comme les autres by Michèle Hazana et Martine Margot, 2021
