= Tombe la neige =

1963 single by Adamo

- 7" vinyl Belgian single cover

Single by Adamo

from the album Adamo
- Language: French
- Released: October 1963
- Recorded: 1963
- Genre: Soul pop; easy listening
- Length: 2:55
- Label: La Voix de Son Maître
- Songwriter: Salvatore Adamo

Adamo singles chronology
"N'est-ce pas merveilleux" (1963)	"Tombe la neige" (1963)	"Vous permettez, Monsieur?" (1963)

Music video
- "Tombe la neige" on YouTube

"Tombe la neige" (English: "The snow falls") is a French language song written and sung by Belgian-Italian singer Salvatore Adamo. The song was released in 1963 and became an international hit and one of his best-known songs.

== Charts ==
Chart (1963–1971)	Peak position
Belgium (Ultratop 50 Flanders)	2
Belgium (Ultratop 50 Wallonia)	1
France (IFOP)	8
Italy (Musica e dischi)	21
Japan (Oricon)	3

== Releases ==
45 rpm (France)

- A-side: Tombe la neige (2:55)
- B-side: Car je veux (2:40)

EP (France)

- A1: Tombe la neige (2:55)
- A2: J'ai raté le coche (2:35)
- B1: Car je veux (2:40)
- B2: Le train va (2:50)

Adamo Language versions

Adamo also released versions in many languages that contributed to the propagation of the song worldwide:

- German: "Grau zieht der Nebel"
- Italian: "Cade la neve"
- Japanese: "Yuki ga Furu" (雪が降る)
- Spanish: "Cae la nieve"
- Brazilian: "Cai a neve"
- Turkish: "Her yerde kar var"
- Azeri: "Gar yaqir"
- Persian: "برف می‌بارد"
- Vietnamese: "Tuyết rơi"
- Russian: Идёт снег
- Albanian: Bie Dëborë

== Covers ==
The song was subject to many covers in original French version and in other language versions

- In 1969, Danièle Vidal recorded it on her album L'amour est bleu
- Paul Mauriat made an instrumental version in 1971 on an album also entitled Tombe la neige
- In 2008, Adamo recorded it as a duo with Laurent Voulzy on the album Le bal des gens bien

Languages

- In 1965, Croatian mezzo-soprano Anica Zubović recorded Pada sneg, with lyrics adapted into Serbocroatian by Ildi Ivanji and in arrangement by Aleksandar Subota, as a part of EP Ivan Ivanović.
- In 1965, Turkish singer Ajda Pekkan had her first recording, "Her Yerde Kar Var", an arrangement of Salvatore Adamo's "Tombe la Neige" by Fecri Ebcioğlu.
- In Germany, Alexandra had a hit with the German version "Grau zieht der Nebel"
- In 1968, Emil Gorovets recorded it in Russian as "Padaet sneg" (in Russian И падает снег) on his album Vdali
- In 1973, Taiwanese female singer Wan Qu (婉曲) recorded the first Chinese Mandarin cover version "雪花飄" (The Snowflakes Floating). In 1974, another Chinese Mandarin version under the title of "誰會想念我" (Who Will Think Of Me) was covered by both Hong Kong singer Paula Tsui (徐小鳳) & Singaporean singer 南虹 (Nam Hong). In 1977, another Hong Kong singer Amina (阿美娜) recorded a Japanese & Chinese Mandarin crossover version, titled "落雪" (The Falling Snow) of which the Japanese lyrics part is same as the version of the "Yuki ga Furu" (雪が降る). Also, Hong Kong entertainer Liza Wang (汪明荃) did record a Cantonese version, titled "踏遍霜雪地" (Stepping Through The Snowy Land) in the same year. In 1979, another Cantonese version with the name of "把握今天" (Get Hold Of Today) was recorded by Hong Kong singer May Cheng (鄭寶雯).
- In 2010, Adamo recorded it as a duet with Mario Barravecchia in Italian based on Adamo's Italian rendition "Cade la neve". It appears in a collection album Intimo - Le più belle canzoni italiane
- In 2018 the character 'Adamo' in the movie Patser (gangsta in English) made by Adil El Arbi and Billal Fallah was related to "Tombe la neige" and the actor was also from Belgian-Italian origin despite he played a Moroccan-Italian gangster .
- In 2011, the Turkish-Albanian pop singer Candan Erçetin sang her song "Her Yerde Kar Var" in Turkish and French.
