= Usine Gustave Boël =

Steel works located in La Louvière, Belgium

Coordinates: 50.482425°N 4.179665°E

SA Usine Gustave Boel
- Formerly: Fonderies et Laminoirs Ernest Boucquéau
- Industry: Iron and Steel
- Founded: 1853
- Founder: Ernest Boucquéau
- Successor: Duferco La Louvière (1999); NLMK La Louvière (2006)

The SA Usine Boel (Usines Gustave Boël, or UGB) was a steel works located in La Louvière, Belgium, founded in 1851 as Fonderies et Laminoirs Ernest Boucquéau. From 1880 the works became the property of Gustave Boël.

After a failed acquisition by Koninklijke Hoogovens in 1997 the company became a subsidiary of Duferco in 1999, Duferco La Louvière. Blast furnace production was ended by the beginning of the 21st century. A joint venture including the plant was formed with NLMK in 2006, terminated in 2011, with the NLMK and Duferco splitting flat and long product facilities at the plant. Duferco closed their part of the plant in 2013. As of 2016 the flat products line continues operations as NLMK La Louvière.

== History ==
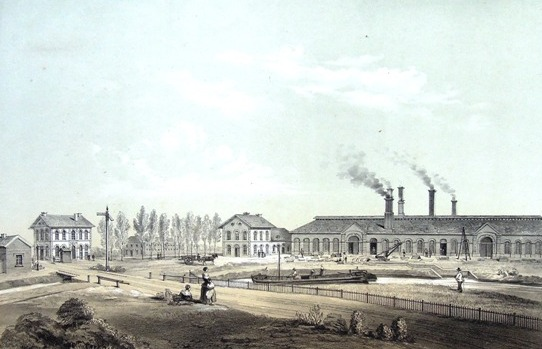
Fonderies et Laminoirs Ernest Boucquéau c.1850

In 1853 Ernest Boucquéau established an iron works in La Louvière, Fonderies et Laminoirs Ernest Boucquéau, situated on the Brussels–Charleroi Canal and in proximity to the Manage to Mons railway line. In 1862 Boucquéau founded the railway company Société du Chemin de Fer de Braine-le-Comte à Gand, the financial demands of the rail project brought Boucquéau to near bankruptcy, but was rescued with the financial aid of Gustave Boël, an accountant within his business. On the death of Boucquéau in 1880 he bequeathed the company to Boël.

By 1897 the company employed 1200 person. In 1913 facilities included two blast furnaces, two batteries of 41 coke ovens; a steel mill (estr.1903) with three Thomas converters; a steel mill with a Martin converter; as well as rolling mills, forges, workshops etc. During the First World War the factory was dismantled and demolished.

Rebuilding took place from 1919, with two blast furnaces/coke oven batteries with a production capacity of 200,00 tons iron per year; three 15 ton Thomas steel converters; an 850mm blooming mill, 580mm heavy plate mill, a large flat universal mill, and a 305mm train mill and rod mill. The foundry of the firm was supplied by three 12 ton Martin process steel converters including facilities for rolling wheels and axles, a casting shop, and running gear manufacturing.

In 1928 the company Usines Gustave Boël was formally formed.

In the 1930s and 40s expansion included two blast furnaces, sinter plant, additional coke ovens and converters, and a 25-ton arc furnace.

In the immediate post Second World War period employment was around 3200. Employment in the post-war period included many Italian immigrants. An additional blast furnace was added in 1958, and again in 1972. The business prospered until the 1970s (see Steel crisis), in the latter part of the 20th century employment dropped - from 3500 in 1985 to 1200 in 2002.

In 1997 A 50% share in the company was taken by Koninklijke Hoogovens as joint venture HB Holding., with an option to buy the remaining shares. The UGB subsidiary Fabrique de Fer de Maubeuge (FFM) was also acquired, and renamed 'Myriad' in 1998. Governmental financing for Hoogoven's rescue investment in UGB La Louvière could not be agreed and the plant was sold to Duferco in 1999, with the state of Wallonia holding half the shareholding. (€99 million) The decision to demolish all blast furnace at the site was made by Duferco in the late 1990s, with demolition taking place in the early 2000s

In 2006 Duferco formed a joint venture, Steel Invest & Finance S.A., (SIF) (Luxembourg) with NLMK (Russia) covering all its European and USA steel operations. At the time of the formation of the jv the works (Duferco La Louvière S.A.) had hot and cold rolling and wire rod production facilities of 2, 1.6 and 0.36 million tons respectively pa, and employed 1508. Rational for the venture was to utilise NLMK's excess upstream steel production in the joint venture's downstream plants.

In 2011 the SIF joint venture was terminated, with Durferco keeping the long products activities including the EAF, whilst NLMK kept the flat products operations - at La Louviere the plant was split between the two businesses, with Duferco to supply the NLMK part of the plant with slabs in the short term (200,000 tons pa for 3 years.)

Duferco ceased operations at the plant in 2013, with the loss of 450 jobs.

As of 2016 NLMK's plant operates under the name NLMK La Louvière, producing hot and cold rolled steel coil.

== Sources ==
- Delplancq, Thierry (2003), "La destruction des hauts-fourneaux des anciennes usines Boël" (PDF), Bulletin trimestriel de l'A.S.B.L. patrimonie industriel Wallonie-Bruxelles (in French) (55)
