= Joséphine Nyssens Keelhoff =

Belgian temperance activist, editor (1833–1917)

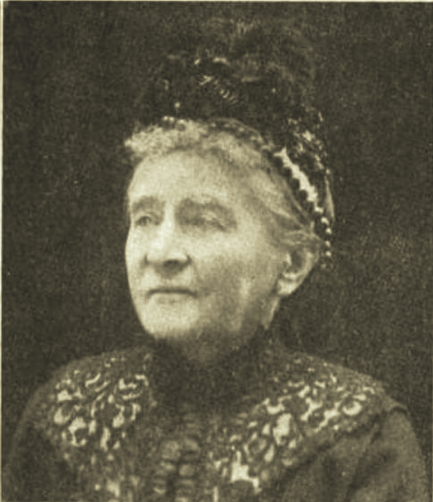
- Born: Joséphine Nyssens; 4 April 1833; Lokeren, East Flanders, Belgium
- Died: 14 March 1917 (aged 83); Neerhaeren, Belgium
- Occupations: temperance activist; women's rights activist; feminist; editor
- Spouse: François Keelhoff (m. 1875; died 1893)

Joséphine Nyssens Keelhoff (1833–1917) was a Belgian social reformer identified with the temperance, feminist, and women's rights movements. She was also an editor of publications that supported her activities. Her struggle for temperance social reform included classic propaganda means for the time: organs, brochures, and conferences. Keelhoff wrote articles for the Union des femmes belges contre l'alcoolisme (Belgian Women's Union Against Alcoholism)'s organs: L'Action sociale first, La Clairière, and Het Geluk des Huisgezins, financing these publications itself. Her death was a severe loss to the temperance movement in Belgium.

== Early life and education ==
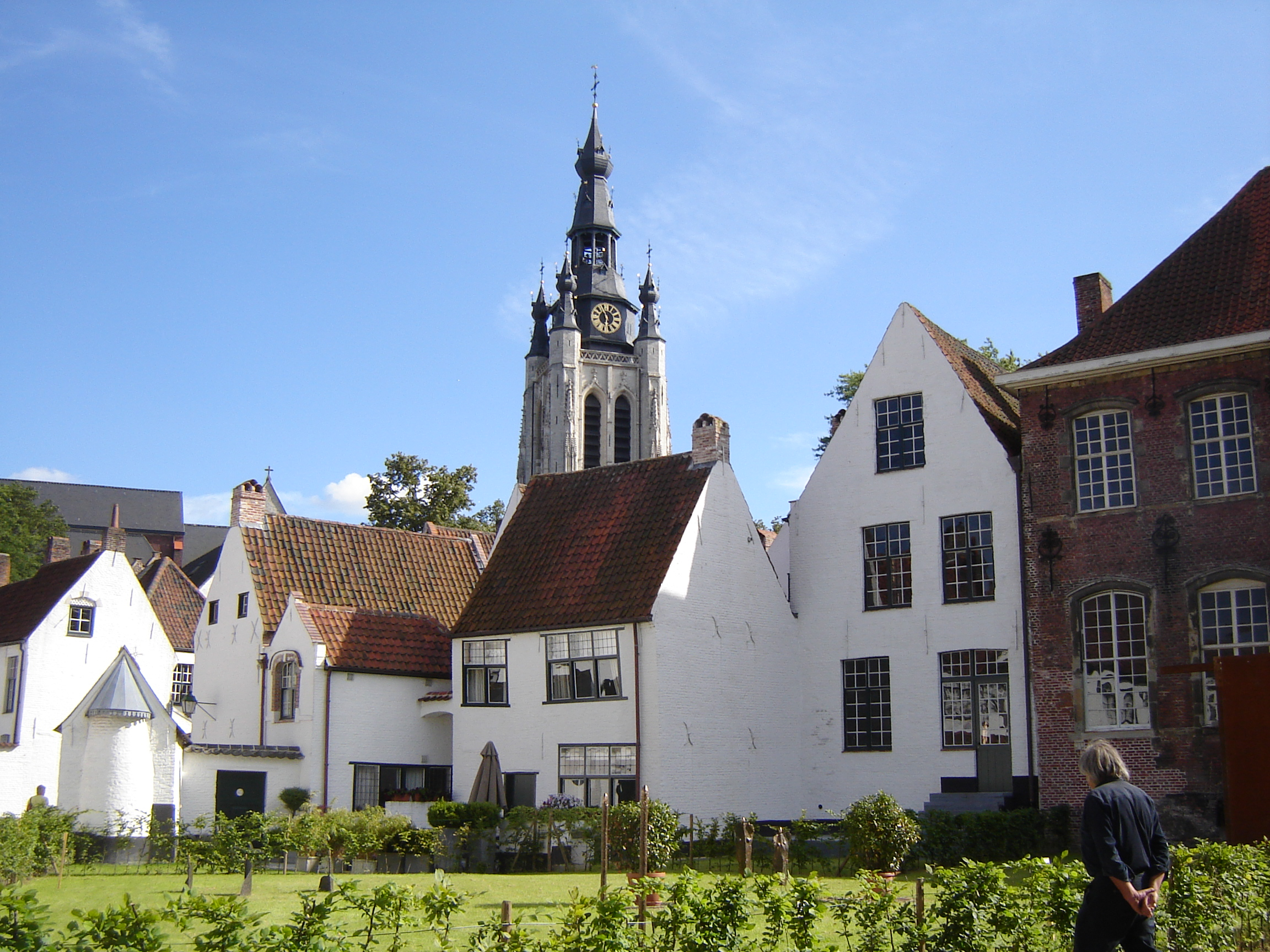
Beguinage in Kortrijk

Joséphine Nyssens was born at Lokeren, East Flanders, 4 April 1833. She was raised in a Catholic environment, a typically bourgeois family, where her mother raised a large family of fifteen children, of whom Joséphine was ninth. Her father ran a cotton fabric factory.

At a time when compulsory education was not legislated, young Joséphine seemed to have benefited from a quality education, at the beguinage at Kortrijk.

== Career ==
Between 1866 and 1869, she worked in the tea and Chinese porcelain industry at "À la Porte Chinoise", run by her sister, Hélène, in Brussels.

During the short Franco-Prussian War (1870–1871), according to family oral tradition, she became involved as a volunteer nurse in the Belgian Association for the Relief of Soldiers Wounded in Wartime, made up mainly of notables.

In 1875, (Note: According to Cherrington (1928), the couple married in 1871.) she married François Keelhoff, a painter from Limbourg and son of the notary of Neerhaeren. She was then 42 years old, her husband 55. She settled in Neerhaeren, her husband's hometown, and she invested in the education of poor children.

=== Temperance ===
Widowed in 1893, and without descendants, Keelhoff sold a large part of her possessions and moved to Brussels to devote herself to the fight against alcohol and to mobilize for the women's cause. As president of the Union des femmes belges contre l'alcoolism of which she was also one of the founders, her long tenure of office (1899–1914) bore witness to her efficient leadership of that society. She was the founder of the temperance journal La Clairiere and of the Flemish publication Het Geluk der Huisgezin (The Health of the Family). From 1904 to 1914, she directed the publication of L'almanach de la femme (The Woman's Almanac), and wrote several small brochures, among others "La Poupee Humaine" (The Human Doll).

The Union's ideals also included more progressive issues such as the status of the worker, women's rights, and compulsory education. The aim was to improve the social system of the time. These ideals became international, and Keelhoff took part in major anti-alcohol demonstrations in Paris in 1900, Geneva in 1903, Budapest in 1905, and Milan in 1907. She received honors at these events: the honorary diploma in Budapest and three gold medal diplomas in Milan. The Union was later subsidized by the Ministry of Agriculture.

Keelhoff's most remarkable achievement was the opening of the Restaurant Hygiénique, on 3 December 1901, on the Place du Sablon in Brussels. With her own funds, Keelhoff took the initiative of renting the first floor of number 40 and setting up a restaurant offering complete meals at affordable prices. The Hygienic Restaurant also housed a library, a reading room, and a conference room. It was in these rooms that feminist speakers would give speeches, for Keelhoff's activism was first and foremost a feminist one. The Restaurant hygiénique was so successful that several similar establishments were built throughout the country.

For some time, she was a member of the general council of the La Ligue patriotique contre l'alcoolisme (The Patriotic League Against Alcoholism). She attended the Sixth International Congress Against Alcoholism, at Brussels, in 1897, and the Eighth Congress, at Vienna, in 1901. At the latter meeting, she read in French a paper, "On Woman’s Participation in the Fight Against Alcoholism". In 1905, Keelhoff became a member of the Conseil Général du Comité National contre l’Alcoolisme (General Council of the National Committee against Alcoholism).

=== Feminism ===
Keelhoff's feminist struggle was an extension of her anti-alcoholism campaign. She held feminist conferences in her Restaurant Hygiénique and delivered speeches that were very modern for the time, calling for gender equality at all levels and denouncing male oppression.

In 1899, Keelhoff joined the Ligue belge du droit des femmes (Belgian League for Women's Rights). She became increasingly involved. In 1905, she joined the Conseil national des femmes belges (CNFB) under the leadership of Marie Popelin, its founder. This council also included the Ligue belge du droit des femmes. Keelhoff contributed to the development of Belgian feminism, while at the same time displaying a pacifism imbued with great humanism. In the same year, she took on the role of Commissioner in the Association des cités-jardins, one of eleven associations developed by the CNBF, offering social housing to families living in slums. In 1909, she became a member of the Belgian Labour Party and devoted her life to the peaceful defense of the Belgian feminist movement.

== Later life ==
Keelhoff practised total alcohol abstinence herself. She worked tirelessly until 1914. As Europe got bogged down in World War I, Keelhoff retired to Neerhaeren, where she died 14 March 1917.

== Awards and honours ==
- Honorary diploma, Budapest (1905)
- Three gold medal diplomas, Milan (1907)

== Selected works ==
- "Répertoire de la presse féminine et féministe en Belgique 1830–1944", Action sociale, Brussels, Inbel, vol. I, 1903–1914, pp. 2, 87.
- "Repertorium van de feministische en vrouwenpers 1830–1994", Het Geluk Des Huisgezins, Brussels, Inbel, vol. II, 1994, pp. 76–77.
