= Emma Leclercq =

Belgian cell biologist (1851–1933)

- Born: August 15, 1851; Saint-Josse-ten-Noode, Belgium
- Died: April 24, 1933 (aged 81); Geel, Belgium
- Occupations: Natural scientist, feminist
- Known for: First female student at Université libre de Bruxelles, first female graduate of Ghent University

Emma Leclercq (15 August 1851 – 24 April 1933) was a Belgian cell biologist and feminist lecturer. She was known for being the first female student and graduate from Université libre de Bruxelles (U. L. B. ), and the first female doctorate earner from Ghent University.

== Biography ==
Leclercq was born on 15 August 1851 in Sint-Joost-ten-Node. Her father was a sculptor and engraver and her mother a housewife. Leclercq began teaching in Brussels at the Isabelle Gatti de Gamond girls' high school. She petitioned to enroll in the Faculty of Sciences at Université libre de Bruxelles for the 1878–1879 academic year. However, her request was denied until 1880. Leclercq enrolled in the science faculty at the university at the same time as Marie Destree and Louise Popelin. She earned her bachelor's at U.L.B. in 1883 and her doctorate in natural sciences from Ghent in 1885. She was the first woman to graduate from Ghent University, as the first enrolled woman student, Sidonie Verhelst, completed only two years of her degree. Verhelst had experienced harassment from a male colleague.

In November 1885, Leclercq became the only female member of la Société Belge de Microscopie. She studied spermatogenesis at the Collège de France under Édouard-Gérard Balbiani and at Ghent under Charles van Bambeke in 1890. Her papers on spermatogenesis and microorganisms were published in the journal of the French Academy of Sciences the same year. Later, in 1893, she gave lectures on behalf of the Ligue belge du droit des femmes, and was an inspector of schools.

Leclercq died in Geel on 24 April 1933.
