= Louise Popelin =

Belgian pharmacist

Popelin Louise archives

Louise Popelin (11 April 1850 – 1937) was a Belgian pharmacist and feminist. She was one of the first women university students in Belgium, the first woman pharmacist in Belgium, and helped to set up the Ligue du droit des femmes (Belgian League for Women’s Rights) in 1892.

== Early life and education ==
Popelin was born on 11 April 1850 in Schaerbeek in Brussels. She was from a middle-class family and was one of four children. She initially trained as a teacher and then from 1868 until 1875 taught at Isabelle Gatti de Gamond’s Cours d'Éducation pour Jeunes Filles in Brussels.

Popelin’s sister Marie Popelin was appointed to lead a new primary school for girls in 1875, in Mons, and Popelin resigned her position to teach alongside her. In September of 1880 Popelin enrolled at the Université libre de Bruxelles to study natural sciences. At that time there were no female students or faculty, so the three women that enrolled in 1880, Popelin, Emma Leclercq and Marie Destrée, were the first women students.

== Pharmacy ==
After finishing her degree in natural sciences, Poplin trained as a pharmacist, qualifying in 1887, and opened a pharmacy on Brussel’s rue Notre-Dame-au-Bois.

Popelin and her sister Marie are regarded as the “first feminists in Belgium”. Marie was the first Belgium woman to earn a Doctor of Laws, but was refused entry to the bar. The Popelin sisters founded the Belgian League for Women’s Rights (Ligue du droit des femmes), seeking political, economic and civil equality of women, in 1892. Popelin represented the League at the 1909 International Council of Women in Toronto.

Popelin died in 1937. A room in the campus of the ULB is named after her.
