= Augustine De Rothmaler =

Belgian pedagogue and feminist

Augustine de Rothmaler
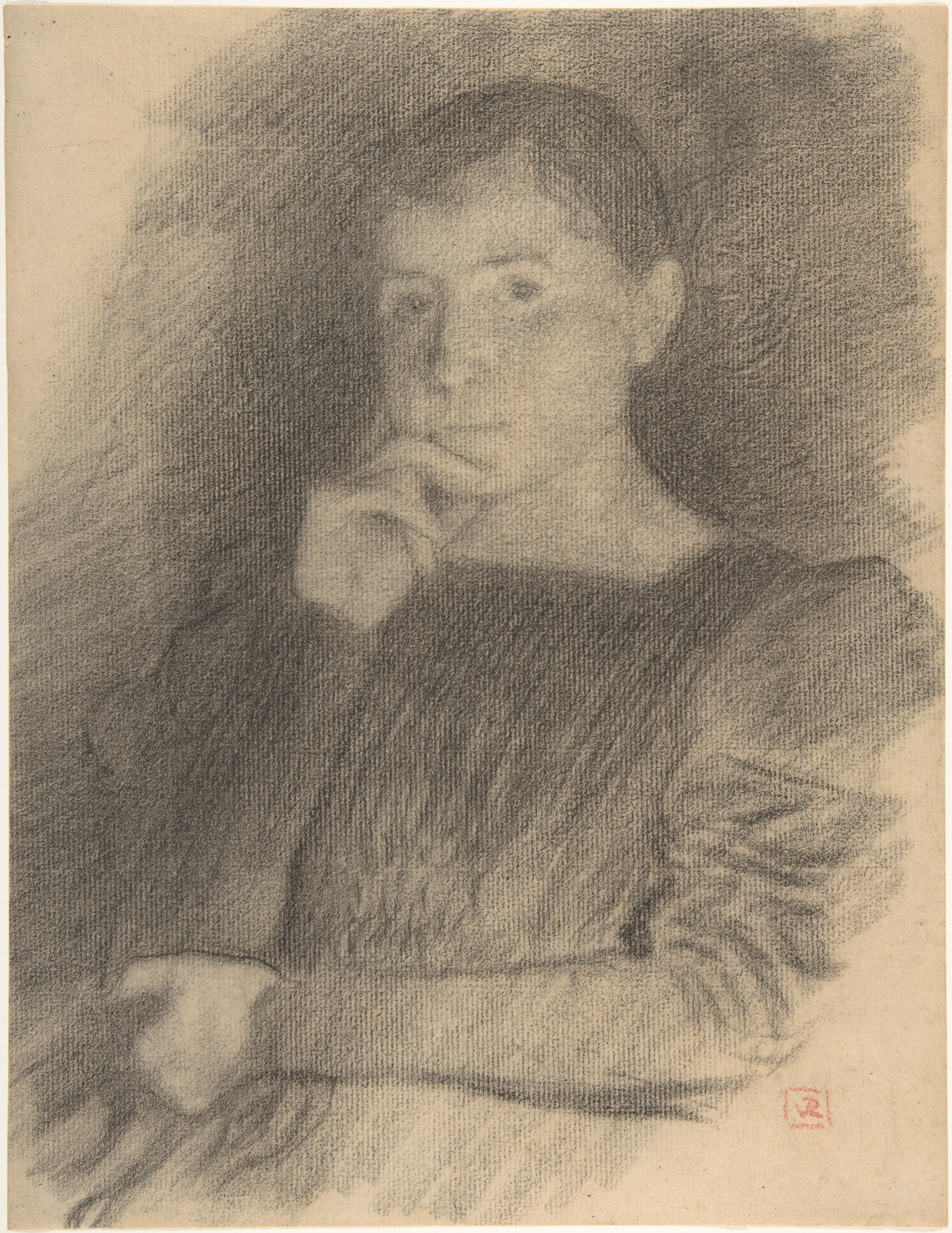
- Portrait of Augustine De Rothmaler by Théo van Rysselberghe (1894), now in the Metropolitan Museum of Art
- Born: November 12, 1859; Brussels, Belgium
- Died: November 28, 1942 (aged 83); Le Lavandou, France
- Occupations: Pedagogue; feminist

Augustine De Rothmaler (November 12, 1859 – November 28, 1942) was a Belgian pedagogue and feminist. After attending the Cours d'éducation, she taught at Cours d'éducation B for thirty years before becoming the institution's director, assuring that school classes paid attention to social aspects, feminism, and pacifism. Her interests in literature included translating works by German and Danish writers into French.

== Early life and education ==
Augustine De Rothmaler was born in Brussels, Belgium on November 12, 1859. She was the daughter of Gustave De Rothmaler, head of the Population Department of Brussels. She attended the Cours d'éducation, the girls' school founded and run by Isabelle Gatti de Gamond. These Cours d'éducation were a breeding ground for future feminists, nicknamed the "Gatticiennes", who formed the network of the feminist movement after earning their diploma. She graduated from higher education in 1876.

She taught for three months and then went to Romanshorn, Switzerland, where she completed courses at the Zollinkofer Institute in a year and obtained an additional diploma. Her stay in Romanshorn also enabled De Rothmaler to improve her knowledge of German and to develop an interest in Germanic languages in general. Later, she also studied Danish.

== Career ==
=== Education ===
At the beginning of 1878, she returned to Brussels and taught literature, French, and English at the Cours d'éducation B in rue du Marais (which became the Henriette Dachsbeck High School). She was a very popular teacher with her students. In 1897, De Rothmaler was appointed "regent first class" there. Ten years later, in 1907, she declined a proposal to join the new middle school in Brussels. On September 1, 1911, De Rothmaler succeeded Aline Héris as Director of Cours d'éducation B, where she had been teaching for thirty years.

Like Gatti, De Rothmaler strove to promote a social spirit among her students. She assured that more girls from poor neighborhoods around Cours d'éducation B were able to attend, in order to ensure a greater social mix with girls from the middle classes who were attending the school. Great attention was also paid in the school's classes to social aspects, feminism, and pacifism, which did not prevent it, during the German occupation, from encouraging a patriotic sense in its collaborators and students.

In 1911, she joined the Alliance Belge pour la Paix par l'Éducation (Belgian Alliance for Peace through Education), recently founded by Maria Rosseels and Claire Baüer, and later the Ligue belge de l'éducation (Belgian League for Education). After her retirement in 1919, De Rothmaler became an honorary member of the Ligue de l'éducation (Education League) and remained active at the Institut des Hautes Etudes.

=== Literature ===
Throughout her career, De Rothmaler maintained a great interest in literature in general and French literature in particular. She frequented the circles of writers as well as artists and introduced the classical matinees organized at the Royal Park Theatre and at the New University of Brussels.

She also translated a certain number of works by German and Danish writers, notably Johannes V. Jensen, and wrote several publications on the iconography of the writer and feminist George Sand, who was De Rothmaler's model.

== Personal life ==
During her life, De Rothmaler formed a great friendship with the couple Théo and Maria Van Rysselberghe. The latter was one of De Rothmaler's former students and they shared a passion for French literature. In 1894, Théo Van Rysselberghe made a portrait of Augustine De Rothmaler, which is now in the Metropolitan Museum of Art in New York City.

After retiring, De Rothmaler joined the van Rysselberghe couple in Le Lavandou, France where they had been living since 1910. She died there on November 28, 1942, at the age of 83, and is buried in the van Rysselberghe family vault.

== Selected works ==
- "Les prétendus portraits de George Sand", in Mercure de France (1924), p. 688-697 (in French)
- "Les portraits de George Sand, in Gazette des Beaux-Arts (1926), p. 70-78 (in French)
