= Isala Van Diest =

Belgian physician

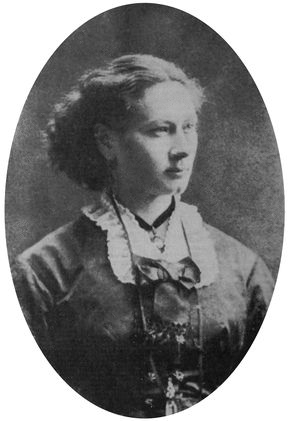
- Photograph portrait of Isala Van Diest
- Born: Anne Catherine Albertine Isala Van Diest; 7 May 1842; Leuven, Belgium
- Died: 9 February 1916 (aged 73); Knokke, Belgium
- Occupation: medical doctor

Isala Van Diest (7 May 1842 – 9 February 1916) was the first female medical doctor and the first female university graduate in Belgium.

== Early life and education ==
Anne Catherine Albertine Isala Van Diest was born in Louvain, Belgium, 7 May 1842. She was the daughter of an open-minded surgeon and obstetrician, Pierre Joseph Van Diest. Van Diest and her sisters received the same education as their brother. Their mother also took them on a trip to England, where they came into contact with the progressive environment.

Secondary high schools were not yet at that time available to girls in Belgium, so Van Diest travelled to Bern, Switzerland to prepare for university. She returned to Belgium in 1873 and attempted to register with the Medical Faculty of the Catholic University of Louvain, but was hampered by the refusal of the Roman Catholic religious hierarchy, who suggested to her that she instead become a midwife. She refused this proposal and returned to Bern, since the Swiss universities were the first of Europe to open up to women and she could pursue medical studies there.

She graduated in 1879.

== Career ==
Van Diest practised her profession for two years in England, where women doctors were free to practise since 1866. She was attached to the New Hospital for Women, and during the time she met many British feminists.

She once again returned to Belgium, however, to be able to have her medical qualifications recognized, she was forced to complete additional courses at the Free University of Brussels, open to women since 1880. It then took a Royal Decree in 1884, in order to be allowed to open her own medical practice in Brussels.

Many of her patients came from the upper classes of Brussels society, but she also treated pensioners at a nursing home for elderly prostitutes and fought for better treatment for prostitutes. A feminist, she founded the Belgian League for the Rights of Women (Ligue belge du droit des femmes) with Marie Popelin, the first Belgian woman to receive a degree in law, and activist Léonie La Fontaine.

In 1902, progressively losing her eyesight, she ended her professional activities and moved to Knokke, where she passed her final years.

== Death and legacy ==
She died in Knokke, Belgium, 9 February 1916. Van Diest and Marie Popelin were together depicted on the 2 euro commemorative coin, 5 million of which were minted in 2011 by the National Bank of Belgium on the occasion of the centenary of International Women's Day. In Belgium, this was the first time that women who were not part of the royal family appeared on a piece of Belgian money.

== See also ==
- Women in medicine
- Feminism

== Bibliography ==
- de Bueger-Van Lierde, F. (1976). "Popelin, Marie". Biographie nationale de Belgique. Vol. 39. Brussels: Académie royale de Belgique. 733-742.
