= Henri La Fontaine =

Belgian politician and Nobel Peace Prize laureate (1854–1943)

Henri Marie La Fontaine
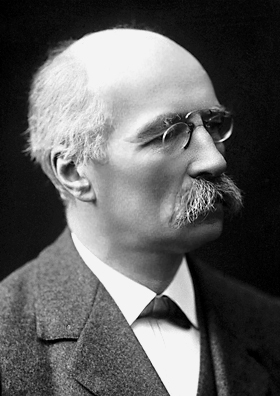
- La Fontaine, c. 1914
- Born: Henri Marie La Fontaine; 22 April 1854; Brussels, Belgium
- Died: 14 May 1943 (aged 89); Brussels, Belgium
- Occupation: Lawyer
- Known for: Nobel Peace Prize (1913)

Henri La Fontaine (French pronunciation: [ɑ̃ʁi lafɔ̃ˈtɛn]; 22 April 1854 – 14 May 1943) was a Belgian international lawyer and president of the International Peace Bureau. He received the Nobel Peace Prize in 1913 because "he was the effective leader of the peace movement in Europe."

== Biography ==
La Fontaine was born in Brussels on 22 April 1854 and studied law at the Free University of Brussels (now split into the Université libre de Bruxelles and the Vrije Universiteit Brussel). He was admitted to the bar in 1877 and established a reputation as an authority on international law. He and his sister Léonie La Fontaine were early advocates for women's rights and suffrage, founding in 1890 the Belgian League for the Rights of Women. In 1893, he became professor of international law at the Free University of Brussels and two years later was elected to the Belgian Senate as a member of the Socialist Party. He served as vice chairman of the Senate from 1919 to 1932.

La Fontaine took an early interest in the International Peace Bureau, founded in 1882, and was influential in the Bureau's efforts to bring about The Hague Peace Conferences of 1899 and 1907. He served as president of the Bureau from 1907 until his death in 1943. World War I convinced La Fontaine that the world would establish an international court when peace returned. He proposed a number of possible members, including Joseph Hodges Choate, Elihu Root, Charles William Eliot, and Andrew Dickson White. La Fontaine also promoted the idea of unification of the world's pacifist organizations.

He was a member of the Belgian delegation to the Paris Peace Conference in 1919 and to the League of Nations Assembly (1920–21). In other efforts to foster world peace, he founded the Centre Intellectuel Mondial (later merged into the League of Nations Institute for Intellectual Co-operation) and proposed such organizations as a world school and university, and a world parliament. In 1907, with Paul Otlet, he founded the Union of International Associations. He also is the co-founder of Institut International de Bibliographie (which later became the International Federation for Information and Documentation, FID) along with Paul Otlet. It was in this role that he and Otlet attended the World Congress of Universal Documentation in 1937.

Henri La Fontaine was a freemason, and a member of the lodge Les Amis Philanthropes in Brussels. He died on 14 May 1943 in Brussels.

== Works ==
Henri La Fontaine was the author of a number of legal handbooks and a documentary history of international arbitration:

- Les droits et des obligations des entrepreneurs de travaux publics (1885)
- Traité de la contrefaçon (1888)
- Pasicrisie internationale (1902)
- Bibliographie de la Paix et de l'Arbitrage (1904)

He was also founder of the review La Vie Internationale.

== See also ==
- List of peace activists
