= Elise Plasky =

Belgian writer (1865–1944)

Elisabeth Plasky
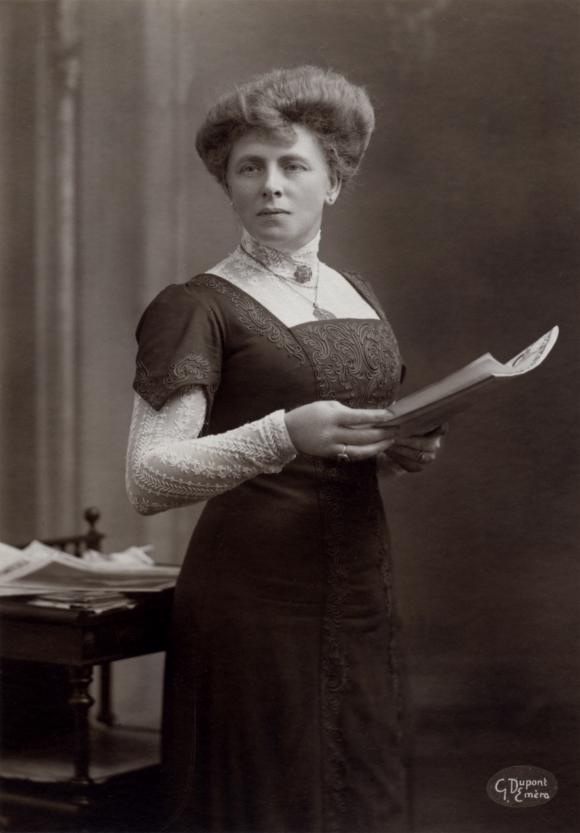
- Plasky in 1910
- Born: Elisabeth Van de Vyvere; 1865; Brussels, Belgium
- Died: 1944 (aged 78–79)
- Occupations: Writer; labour inspector
- Years active: 1901–1944
- Spouse: Eugène Plasky (m. 1883; died 1905)
- Children: 5

Elisabeth "Elise" Plasky (née Van de Vyvere; c. 1865–1944) was a Belgian writer and the first female labour inspector in Belgium. She advocated for working-class women's emancipation and the creation of a public and free childcare system.

== Biography ==
=== Life and marriage ===
Elisabeth Van de Vyvere was born in 1865 in Brussels into a bourgeois family, she was the daughter of architect Edmond Van de Vyvere. In 1883, she married painter Eugène Plasky—they had five children.

== Career ==
=== Writer ===
Under the pseudonym Stella, she wrote articles for different newspapers and dedicated herself to the arts. She composed poems and one-act farces and wrote one comedy (Par hasard) and one critical review (Chez nous).

=== Labour inspector ===
From 1901, she changed her work orientation and became the first female labour inspector in Belgium for the Ministry of Industry and Labour.

In 1921, and until her death in 1944, Plasky led the Labour and Social Welfare Commission of the National Council of Belgian Women (the Conseil National des Femmes Belges / Nationale Vrouwenraad van België). Also, between the two World Wars that rocked Belgium, she led the Society for the Defence and Learning of the Women's Occupations (Societé pour la défense et l'apprentissage des métiers féminins) that tried to protect works such as bobbin lace.

When Plasky started in her new job as a labour inspector, it was in the context of high industrialisation and with migration to the cities where the factories where located. Child labour was normal and that school attendance was not yet compulsory.

For childcare, the first nursery in Belgium opened in Brussels in 1845 and other initiatives follow in Ghent in 1869. These first institutions were medical-oriented to prevent the high mortality at that time, not family centers, and most of the times they were private and charity initiatives.

In 1909, Plasky published a report in which she defended the image of a complete childcare welfare system supported by the public authorities, like happened in the municipality of Liège where since 1879 childcare was fully organised and paid by the local government. She campaigned for more crèches to be built.

== Publications ==
- Pages De La Vie: Conférences Sur L'alcoolisme Et Sur Les Oeuvres De Prévoyance En Belgique. Huy: Imprimerie Charpentier Et Emond, 1902.
- La Protection Et L'éducation De L'enfant Du Peuple En Belgique. Bruxelles: DeWit, 1922.
- Crise économique et travail féminin. S.l: S.n.
- L'intervention des patrons et chefs d'industrie dans la question des pensions ouvrières. 2e éd. ed. Bruxelles: Corné-Germon, 1904.
