= Louis Frank (lawyer) =

Belgian lawyer

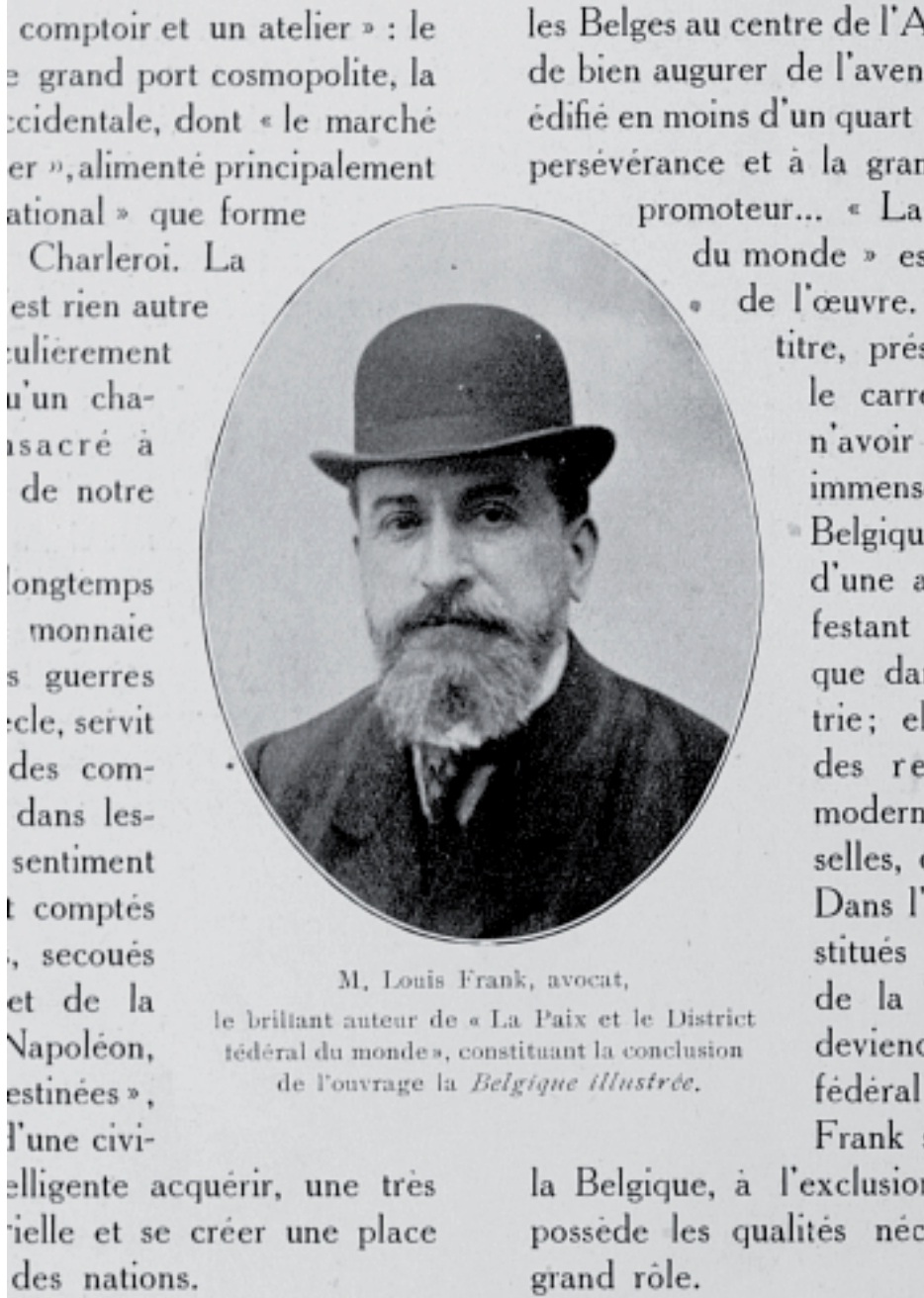
Photograph of Louis Frank in "L’Expansion belge", published in 1911

Louis Frank (Brussels, January 22, 1864 – Brussels, July 25, 1917) was a Belgian lawyer, philosopher and pioneer of the Belgian feminist movement.

As a liberal activist and academician, he devoted his career to the promotion of the rights of women and children and for a new social order.

He represented Marie Popelin at the bar during the "Popelin affair" and co-founded the Belgian League for the Rights of Women.

At the end of his life, he led a fight for pacifism and campaigned to make the city of Brussels a "federal district of the world".

== Biography ==
=== Youth and early life ===
Louis Franck was born into a modest Belgian Jewish family. His father Meyer Frank was a stockbroker and his mother Eugénie Herman was a housewife. Aged sixteen, his father died and his mother quickly spent the family patrimony. He followed a brilliant scholarship and was awarded in 1878, the prize for the general competition of the athenaeums of the kingdom. He graduated in law and philosophy from the Université libre de Bruxelles in 1886, with the mention distinction and great distinction. A year later he was awarded the "Laurea in Giurisprudezia con lode" from the University of Bologna for his work on "illegitimate children", and is spotted by the press following the publication of an "impressive series of works".

Engaged in Jewish philanthropy, he devoted two books to it. He fiercely supported Alfred Dreyfus, and intervened at the bar in his favor during his trial, as well as during that of Émile Zola in 1898. He worked briefly as a bank lawyer-advisor, but gave up this post in 1890 to devote himself to the feminist cause.

=== Feminism ===
==== "Popelin Affair" ====
Louis Frank represented Marie Popelin as her lawyer in the "Popelin affair". Frank rejected before the Court the argument that the function of lawyer is a public function, and argued that no legal provisions prevent women from accessing it.

Frank argues that on the contrary the exercise of a woman is in conformity with the spirit of the decree of December 14, 1810 on the exercise of the function of the profession of lawyer and the exercise of the bar. Louis Frank defends a liberal interpretation of the laws of the Civil Code, rather than a reform. He also puts forward arguments on judicial organization and quotes the law of 1876 on the acquisition of diplomas. In addition, Frank questions the historical argument about the incompatibility of women with the office of lawyer, citing counterexamples from Roman law, ancient Egypt, ancient Greece, and young Christian civilizations, which left a place for women in public debate and sometimes in Justice. Louis Franck concludes that his client has the right to receive at least the title and the quality of lawyer. This request will be rejected in 1889. Despite this failure, Louis Frank encouraged Jeanne Chauvin to apply for admission to the Paris Bar. Frank is called as adviser, coordinates with her the legal strategy. and support by publishing numerous articles and pamphlets in his favor, attacking the injustice of the Napoleonic Code.

==== Women's rights activist and theorist ====
As early as 1886, he wrote numerous essays on women's rights and participated in numerous conferences. In September 1888, then in the middle of the Popelin affair, he published a major pamphlet 'La femme-avocat', in which he defended the entry of women into the legal profession. The latter advocates a revision of the Civil Code, and his theses will be widely popularized in the society.

In 1891, he presented his thesis on "The right of women to make use of the diploma obtained" at the University Congress of Ghent, and was awarded the title of laureate at the Rossi competition, which was organized by the University of Ghent. by the Paris Law School, for his work on the theme of political condition of women.

In 1892 he published a work of more than 600 pages, Essay on the political status of women, in which he defended feminism and was echoed in the press and was an international success. His work constitutes the first significant work on the issue. He defends a political equality that is indispensable for civil equality, and defends their right to suffrage.

political, administrative and professional. Frank denounces injustices and speaks out in favor of gender equality:

Society will continue its rational march to finally arrive, through successive transformations, at civil and political gender equality, which will be, in the future, one of the cardinal principles of constitutional law (p. 223)

On this subject the New York Herald describes his work in the following terms:

This is probably the most voluminous and comprehensive work ever devoted to the social and political condition of the fairer sex

These moderate feminist positions are sometimes well received in the press, especially when it evokes the creation of a feminist organization. The Université libre de Bruxelles awarded him a special doctorate in public law for a thesis on the status of women and he organizes numerous conferences to rally members to his feminist organization. He also seeks to increase support for his cause by sending copies to such personalities as the countess of Flanders or the baron of Rothschild, as well as foreign feminists such as Wilhelmina Drucker, who congratulated him warmly.

Subsequently, in April 1982, he founded the Belgian League for Women's Rights with Marie Popelin. The event is often considered as the "birth certificate" of Belgian feminism. He leads the organization as Secretary General and continues to write books on feminism such as La femme dans les emplois publics. He resigned from the leadership of his organization in December 1893. The newspaper Messager de Bruxelles describes this resignation, although he was very active in popularizing the cause:

Women soon rallied against him. He had taken too much for himself...

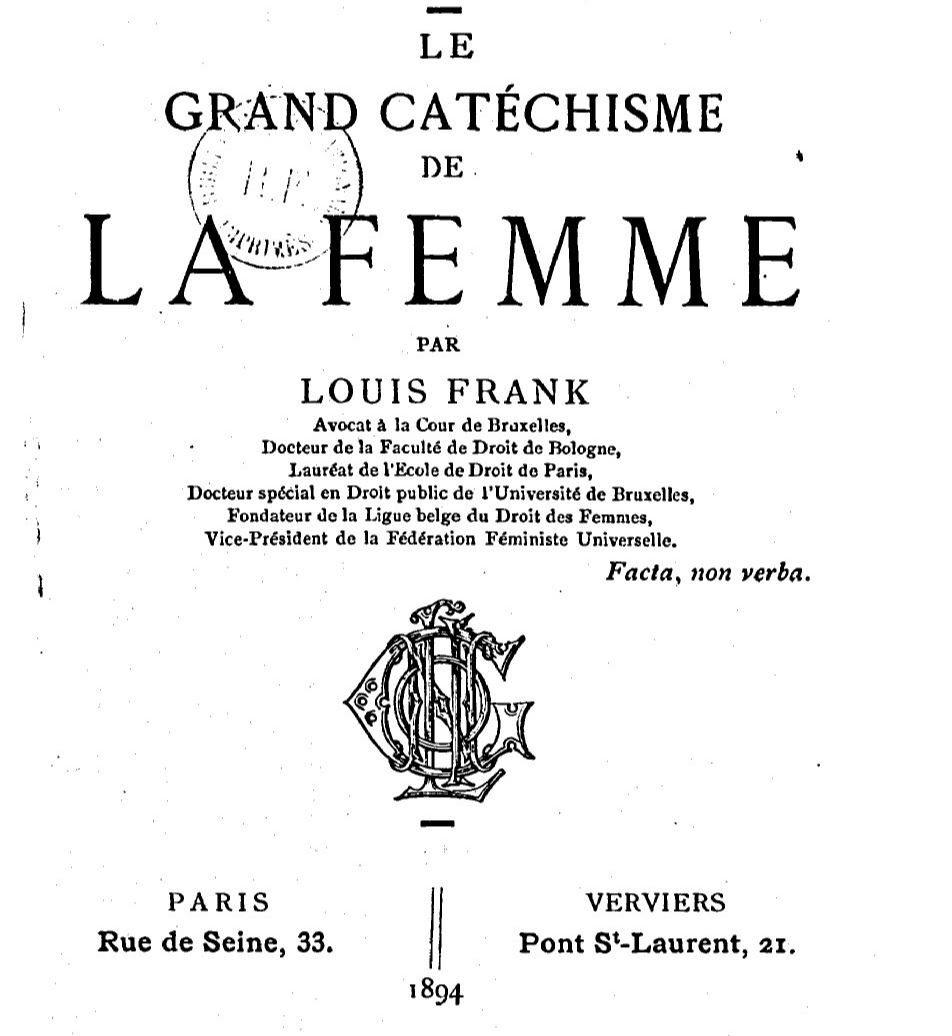
Presentation of Louis Frank on the cover of his book Le Grand Catéchisme de la femme.. The book is translated into six languages

After leaving the organization, he continued to write numerous books and opinion articles in favor of the emancipation of women in society, such as "The Great Catechism of Women", "Maternal Assurance", "Domestic Education of Young Girls". In his writings he touches on all aspects of women's lives, from the education of young girls, to the care of mothers, to maternal insurance.

He quickly renewed his ties with the league, attended dinners and participated in the creation of the first International Feminist Congress, which was organized in Brussels in 1897. Frank also continues to maintain correspondence with many feminists, including in particular the Dutch Wilhelmina Drucker, with whom he frequently shares accounts of the situation in Belgium. Frank also participated for three years in writing articles published in Drucker's feminist journal, Evolution. In return, Drucker had some of his books translated into Dutch.

The question of peace is also of concern to Frank, and he defended the role that women could play in this cause before the International Peace Congress held in Antwerp in 1894.

During this period, he also focused his activism on access to higher education for women and founded the 'Œuvre des conférences féministes' at the ULB. In 1895, he became a professor at this university and taught courses on feminist legislation.

The following year, he proposed three bills on "The testimony of the woman", "The savings of the married woman" and "The wages of the working family". He also founded a "Universal Feminist Office", centralizing documents related to this cause, and thus improving coordination between feminist circles.

==== Precursor of universal suffrage ====
Louis Frank will defend universal suffrage, including for women, publishing in 1891, Le Vote cumulatif ou le suffrage universel proportionnel and a second essay in 1909, Le Suffrage universel proportionnel et intégral'.

Louis Frank defends female suffrage. His project is supported by Louise van den Plas, while Popelin is reserved.

==== Fight against alcoholism ====
As a member of the "Patriotic League against Alcoholism", he participates in the fight against alcoholism. In particular, he advocates feminism as a remedy for this scourge:

Only the active, intelligent and conscious cooperation of women will be able to eradicate the alcoholic evil from all peoples.

He explains his thesis in his book La femme contre l'alcool published in 1896.

=== Pacifism ===
Around 1905, Frank became involved in the pacifist movement. He became one of the figures of the Pacifist Union, and participated in the plan of the World Palace. Despite his good will, he was limited in his great ambitions.

==== Brussels as an international capital ====
In 1905, Frank wrote The Belgians and Peace. In his book he defends a pacifist and internationalist Belgium. He then published a second volume The Organization of Peace and the Federal District of the World in which he developed the idea for the first time, according to which the city of Brussels would become an ideal administrative capital of a future World Confederation.

Frank seeks to attract the support of philanthropists to his project, including Ernest Solvay and Andrew Carnegie. On June 25, 1905, he receives the support of the King of the Belgians Leopold II, in his idea to make Belgium "a center of the world institutions that will be created in the future ". Frank also obtained the support of the future king Albert I It also attracts the support of political figures such as Édouard Descamps or Auguste Beernaert, the latter offering him his "warmest congratulations".

Frank also proposes to create a celebration of the centenary of the Battle of Waterloo in the hope that this would mark the beginning of a period of world peace.

On the occasion of the 1910 Brussels World Fair, he was editor of the book La Belgique illustrée published by Larousse and included his idea of a world federal district and presented Belgium as an internationalist and pacifist. His pamphlet is thus promoted during the event, but also in international gatherings taking place in parallel. His idea is echoed in the Belgian press and is taken seriously as a project of a "world city" rather than as a utopia.

In 1913, Frank thought of creating his project in Tervuren/Brussels and tried to be joined by Hendrik Christian Andersen. The plans will finally be abandoned. As the First World War broke out, Louis Frank collected postcards illustrating the greatness of Belgium in albums entitled "Souvenirs". patriotic". He mentions in particular the first international conference on the law of war held in Brussels. His project was taken up again after his death and at the end of the war, by Paul Otlet.

== Reception ==
According to Françoise de Bueger-Van Lierde, both his avant-garde ideas, his exaggerated pretensions and his Jewish origin in a hostile climate played to his disadvantage. He died "in oblivion" in 1917.
