= Louise van den Plas =

Belgian suffragist and founder of the first Christian feminist movement in Belgium

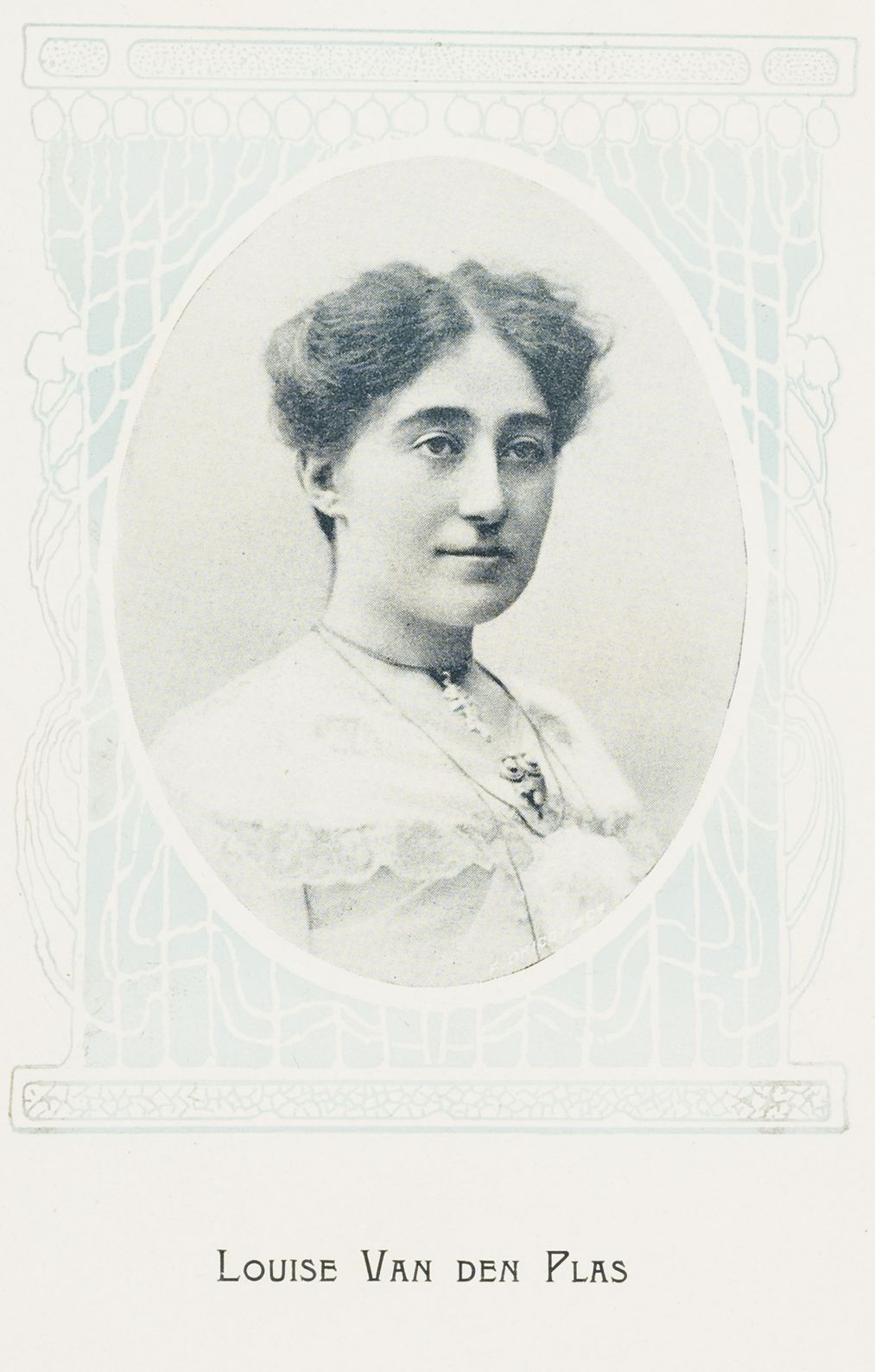
Louise Van den Plas

Louise van den Plas (24 January 1877 – 4 December 1968) was a Belgian suffragist and the founder of the first Christian feminist movement in Belgium.

== Biography ==
Louise van den Plas was born in Brussels, Belgium, on 24 January 1877. She discovered feminism by reading Le grand Catéchisme de la femme, by Louis Frank, and the writings of Marie de Villermont (1848–1925), countess of Hennequin.

In March 1899 in Brussels, she met Marie Duclos,, the co-founder, with Marie Maugeret, of the French Catholic feminist association "Christian Feminism". Van den Plas went to Paris to study this movement and then, on the advice of Duclos, she made contact in Brussels with Belgian journalist Rene Henry and a friend of the latter, Rene Colaert, a member of the Chamber. The latter were all the more interested in the situation of women as Belgium was moving towards universal suffrage and the enlargement of the electorate could benefit the socialists. The latter intended to vote in favor of women's suffrage, but there were fears associated with that.

In May 1902, feminist groups with varied political views created a Feminist Union to weigh in favor of women's suffrage. Van den Plas took this opportunity to represent the Catholic group. "Le Féminisme chrétien de Belgique" (Belgian Christian Feminism) was founded on 6 May 1902. It aimed to improve women's rights and promote feminism among Catholics while respecting the Catholic constitution of the family. (Note: This is both an intimate conviction on the part of the founder and a precaution essential to the attacks it will suffer, especially the preacher François-Xavier Godts in his work of 1903.) As of 1905, it issued a monthly organ, Christian Feminism of Belgium, and provided lectures.

With other feminist organizations, Christian Feminism gave the opportunity for women to enter into family councils and guardianship management, as well as advocating the full civil capacity of women who had obtained legal separation. Through its efforts alone, a woman's testimony was accepted to the acts of civil status (1908). Further, Van den Plas called for the equality of teachers' pay and supported the struggles of feminine unionism along with Victoire Cappe.

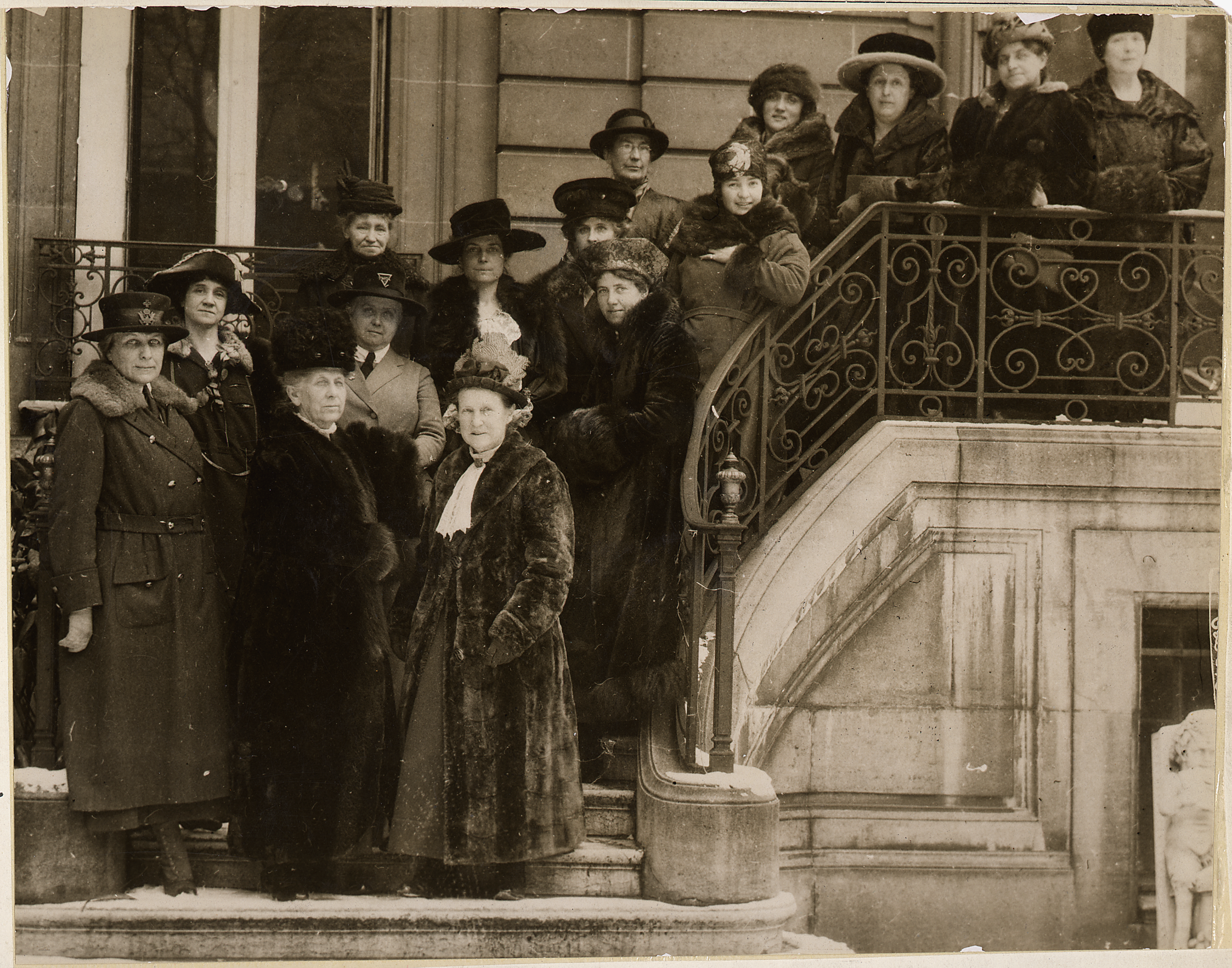
Allied women in Paris to plead for international suffrage. Mlle. Van den Plas on fourth row.

Van den Plas won the sympathy of some of the Catholic newspapers and the Belgian Democratic League for the suffrage of women. She said that women would take a special look at issues of public morality, alcoholism, and school. On 3 March 1912, Christian Feminism founded the Catholic League of Women's Suffrage, with the assistance of Cyrille van Overbergh, a Christian Democratic senator. The League initiated an important petition in January 1913, signed by Van den Plas. Several feminist groups followed suit and together, they created the Suffrage Federation in the following month.

During the World War I, the publication of Christian Feminism's magazine was suspended and Van den Plas founded "Union patriotique des femmes belges" (Patriotic Union of Belgian Women) with Jane Brigode and Marguerite Nyssens, which provided for material aid to women. At the end of the war, the magazine reappeared and Van den Plas was offered a free platform in the daily Le Soir from 1921 to 1940. She died in Willaupuis, Belgium, on 4 December 1968, aged 91.

== Works ==
- Féminisme, 1899
- Pourquoi les chrétiens doivent être féministes, 1904
- Le Féminisme chrétien de Belgique, 1905-1940
- Revision du code civil la séparation de biens avec communauté d'acquêts substituée al communauté légale comme Droit commun en l'absence de Contrat de mariage, 1908
- Etude sur la revision du titre du contrat de mariage, 1909
- L'éducatioin ménagère, 1909
- Een katholieke vrouw over het vrouwenkiesrecht, 1911
- Le suffrage féminin : Discours prononcé à l'Assemblée générale du Féminisme Chrétien de Belgique : Suppl. au Féminisme Chrétien, mars 1912 , 1912
- Féminisme et catholicisme, 1912
- Le suffrage des femmes : discours prononcé au Congrès de la Ligue démocratique, à Courtrai, le 25 septembre 1911, 1913
- Le féminisme chrétien, 1913
- L'union pratriotique des femmes belges, 1915
- Féminisme maternel, 1920
- Quelques souvenirs de vingt ans d'efforts, 1922
- Le féminisme chrètien (Second Edition), 1925
- Ou en est le féminisme en Belgique?, 1931
- La lutte contre l'alcoolisme ses ravages en Belgique spécialement du point de vue familial, des moyens en le vaincre, 1944
- Rapport d'activité présenté à l'Assemblée générale, 1952
- Une grave responsabilité des élites, 1953
