= Conseil national des femmes belges =

Belgian women's organization

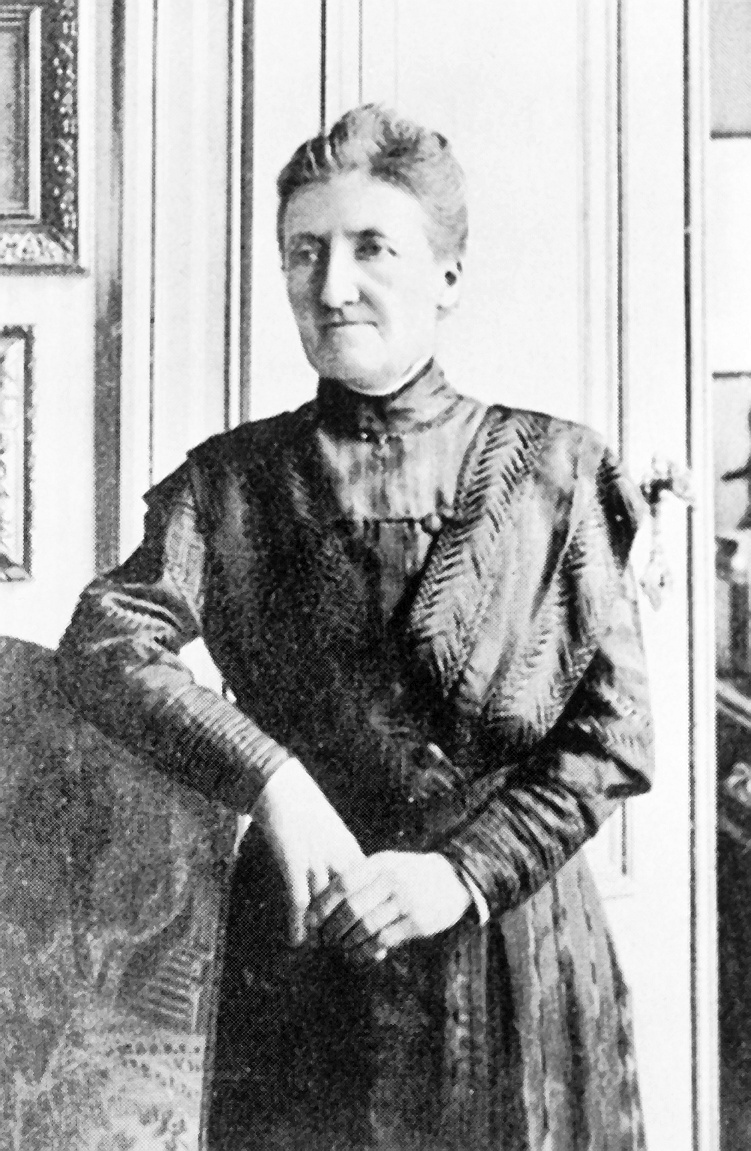
Marie Popelin, founder of the CNFB

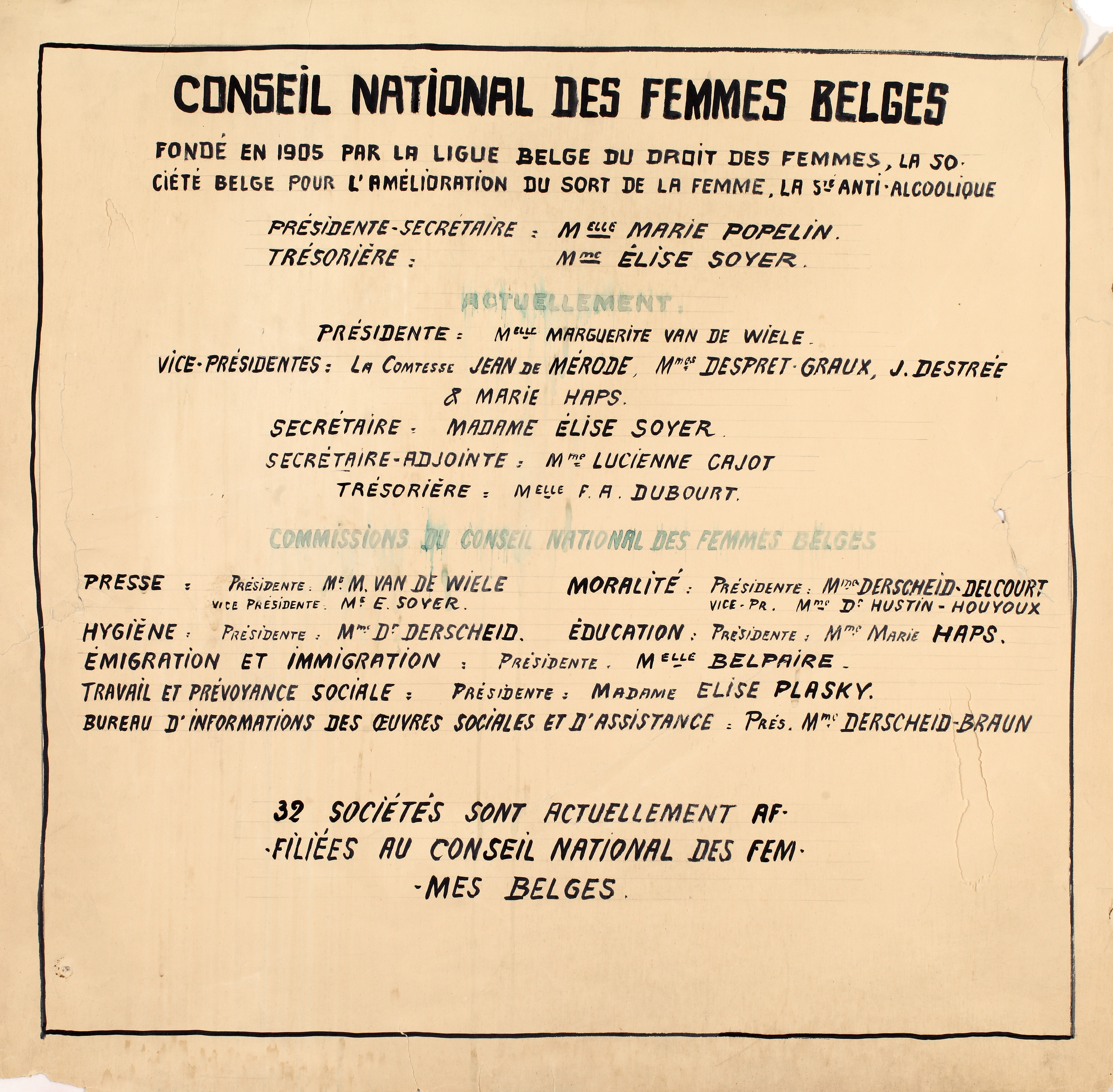
Poster showing details of the CNFB

The Conseil National des Femmes Belges (Dutch: Nationale Vrouwenraad van Belgïe), or National Council of Belgian Women, is the name of a Belgian women's organization which was founded in 1905 as the Belgian chapter of the International Council of Women (ICW). Over the years, the organization succeeded in supporting the emancipation of women in a wide range of interests until its mandate was limited to French-speaking Belgian women in 1974. In 1990, the name was changed to Conseil des Femmes Francophones de Belgique (Council of French-speaking Women of Belgium).

== History ==
The Counseil National des Femmes Belges was established by Marie Popelin in 1905 as the Belgian chapter of the International Council of Women. It initially brought together three organizations: Ligue belge du droit des femmes, Société belge pour l’amélioration du sort de la femme and Union des femmes belges contre l’alcoolisme but by 1906 it had also attracted four additional members: l'Œuvre de la maison des servantes et de la bourse du travail (1889), la Croix verte, l’Union des mères de famille (1902) and La Ruche. Although the organization was intended to be apolitical, from the start it tended to support liberal interests.

After the First World War, the CNFB was one of the few women's organizations which continued to thrive. As its president, Léonie La Fontaine failed to return from Switzerland where she had spent the war, she was replaced in 1920 by Marguerite Van de Wiele, a firm feminist but with a rather traditional approach centred on emancipation rather than voting rights. Nevertheless, under her leadership the organization gained strength, welcoming new members irrespective of their political views. While Catholics such as Marie Haps, Marie-Elisabeth Belpaire and Juliette Carton de Wiart headed committees, in 1921 the aristocratic Marthe Boël was elected vice-president. She drastically revived the approach, attracting a new generation of university students.

In 1934, Jeanne Beeckman, a physician, became one of the vice-presidents, encouraging fresh legal graduates to join. These included Georgette Ciselet, Fernande Baetens, Paule Lamy and Marcelle Renson who, thanks to their legal competence and knowledge of foreign languages, significantly improved the CNFB's international image which had somewhat suffered under Élise Soyer's lack of fluency in English. The newcomers contributed so impressively to the 1933 ICW conference in Stockholm that in 1936 Marthe Boël was chosen to succeed Lady Aberdeen as ICW president.

As president of the CFNB from 1935 to 1952, Boël made substantial progress in all aspects of emancipation: women's place in all the professions, equal pay for equal work, improved higher education for girls, and a better understanding of cohesion at home and abroad. After the Second World War, Boël's leadership continued to provide results with the acceptance of women as magistrates, civic rights of married women and improvements to education. In 1948, women were permitted to vote in national elections. In 1966, Maya Janssen became president, encouraging many young women to join the movement, promoting their professional opportunities, even in areas traditionally reserved for men such as judges, police commissioners, university professors, architects and naval officers.

It was decided in 1974 that the CNFB should be divided into two branches, one for French speakers, the other for Dutch speakers. In 1990, the name of the French-language branch was changed to Conseil des Femmes Francophones de Belgique (Council of French-speaking Women of Belgium).
