= Henriette Dachsbeck =

Belgian educator and feminist

Henriette Dachsbeck

Barbe-Henriette Dieudonnée Dachsbeck (4 September 1841 – 23 January 1914) was a Belgian educator and feminist who was instrumental in the development of women's education in Belgium at the end of the nineteenth century.

== Life ==
Born in Brussels on 4 September 1841, Henriette Dachsbeck collaborated closely with Isabelle Gatti de Gamond on the development of women's education in Belgium.

In 1864, with the financial assistance of the city council, she launched the first systematic courses of secondary female education (Cours d'Éducation pour jeunes filles). Exceptionally for Belgium of the time, this venture was entirely independent of the Catholic Church, and provided the very first organised secular education for women in Belgium. The Catholic press opposed her work but the school was a success. Among the teachers were Marie Popelin and Henriette Dachsbeck.

In 1876 Dachsbeck helped found a second institution for girls on rue de la Paille in Brussels and became its director. This institution later became the college "Lycée Dachsbeck".

In 1897, she opened a pre-university section to prepare girls for the Central Jury examination, which was a prerequisite for university studies.

Henriette Dachsbeck died in Ixelles on 23 January 1914.

== See also ==
- Isabelle Gatti de Gamond
