= Charles Eugène Marie Van Bambeke =

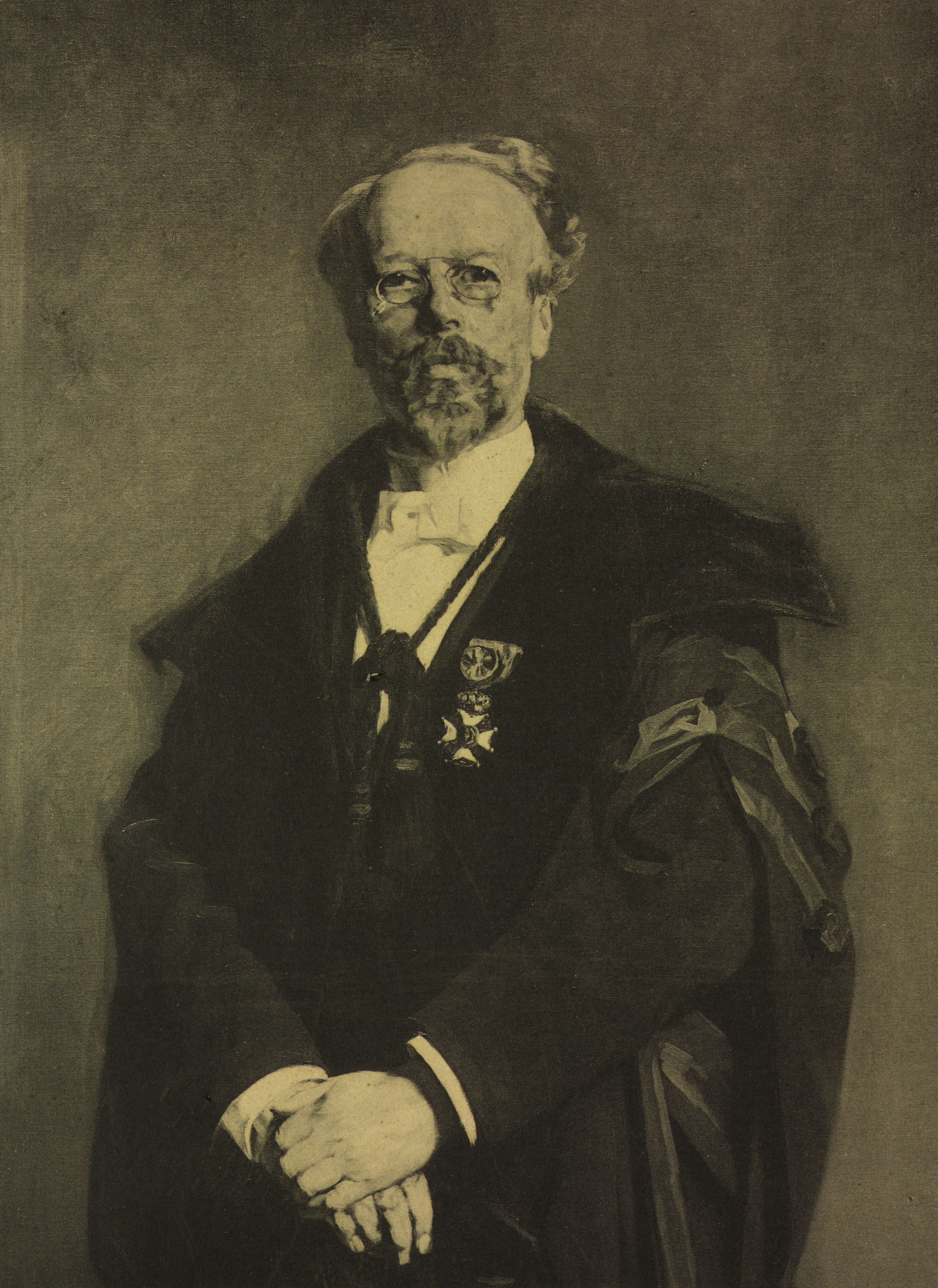
In 1897

Charles Eugène Marie Van Bambeke (February 6, 1829 – May 14, 1918) was a Belgian professor of medicine at Ghent University and a specialist on fungi. He founded the journal "Archives of Biology" along with Edouard van Beneden in 1880. Apart from his own professional interest in medicine, embryology and histology, he took an interest in natural history, studying the fungi and molluscs of the region.

== Life and work ==
Van Bambeke was born in Ghent to Eugène Van Bambeke and Marie Van Ghendt-Fermondt. He went to a primary school run by Soudan-Léger before going to the Collège St.-Barbe in Ghent. After graduating in 1849 in the humanities he joined the university to pursue medicine. He became a doctor of medicine, surgery and midwifery in 1857. Although interested in the natural sciences he began to practice medicine. He was appointed doctor of the poor and worked from 1857 to 1863 and for his services during the cholera epidemic he was awarded a silver medal. He became assistant surgeon at St. John Hospital in 1859 and left in 1889 when the hospital was closed. By 1863 he was also a preparer and curator of comparative anatomy at the University of Ghent. In 1865 he visited the museums of London and Paris. In 1869-70 he took comparative anatomy courses to fill the place of Professor Charles Poelman and in 1871 he taught general anatomy in the place of Richard Boddaert (1834-1909) and public hygiene in the place of C.-A. Lados. In 1872 he became extraordinary professor. He travelled to other European universities to study the teaching of anatomy, physiology and embryology and began to incorporate these in Ghent from 1879. In 1880 he founded the journal, Archives of Biology, along with Édouard Van Beneden of the University of Liège. In 1881-82 he was secretary of the academic council and he became an emeritus professor in 1899.

Van Bambeke worked on the embryology of the natterjack toad and established vertebrate embryology research in Belgium. The Ghent Morphological School founded by him examined development of the forelimb in whales, dolphins, and fish. Along with Van Beneden he helped establish a marine research station at Ostend in 1883. His students included Hector Leboucq, Emma Leclercq, Camille De Bruyne, Julius MacLeod and Omer Van der Stricht.

Van Bambeke took an interest in fungi and molluscs. He was a member of the Leopoldina Academy from 1892, the Imperial Society of Naturalists of Moscow from 1893, and an honorary member of numerous societies. He was made honorary president of the Zoological Society of France in 1897. He presided over the Royal Academy of Belgium in 1893. He was appointed knight of the Order of Leopold in 1881 and to the rank of officer (1896) and commander (1912).

Van Bambeke married Joanna Van Ghendt in 1844 and they had two daughters and a son.
