= Léonie La Fontaine =

Belgian feminist and pacifist (1857–1949)

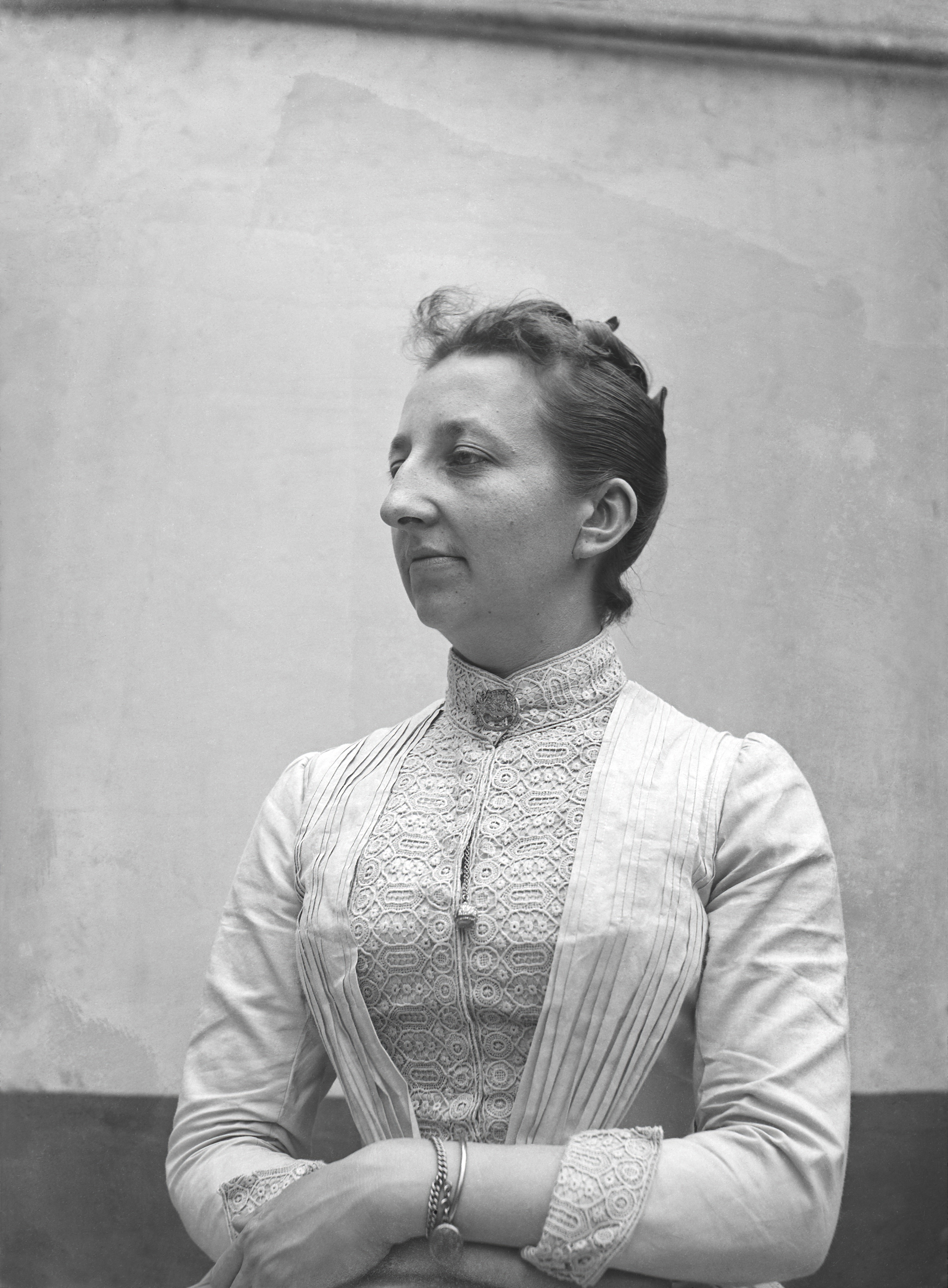
Léonie La Fontaine (1900)

Léonie La Fontaine (October 2, 1857–February 26, 1949) was a Belgian pioneering feminist and pacifist. Active in the international feminism struggle, she was a member of the Belgian League for the Rights of Women, the National Belgian Women Council and the Belgian’s Women's International League for Peace and Freedom. Her brother was Henri La Fontaine, Belgian international lawyer and president of the International Peace Bureau who received the Nobel Prize for Peace in 1913, and was also an early advocate for women's rights and suffrage, founding in 1890 the Belgian League for the Rights of Women.

Very close to the Mundaneum project, initiated by Paul Otlet and her brother Henri La Fontaine and to the notion of documentation, she initiated the Office central de documentation féminine in 1909, and created in her own home a library for the Belgian League for the Rights of Women, to help women in their professional choices. Léonie La Fontaine died on 26 January 1949, the year when the law allowing women to vote came into effect.

== Progressive education ==
Léonie and Henri La Fontaine received a quite progressive education from their mother Louise Philips, who was a very cultivated woman, and animated a salon at her home.

== Marie Popelin affair – trigger ==
Marie Popelin (1846–1913) was the first woman in Belgium who completed her studies as a Doctor of Laws in 1888, at the Université libre de Bruxelles. Mary Popelin applied for admission to the bar association which would allow her to plead cases in the Brussels courts. This was refused, although no law or regulation explicitly prevented the admission of women to the bar. Her appeals to the court of appeal and the Court of Cassation were unsuccessful, but widely reported in the Belgian and foreign press. The "Popelin affair" (French: L'Affaire Popelin) was a trigger for the feminist struggle in Belgium, and brought together supporters of female education and women's rights in Belgium like Léonie La Fontaine, Henri La Fontaine, Hector Denis, Isala Van Diest, Louis Franck, and Marie Popelin. The movement resulted in the creation of the Belgian League for the Rights of Women in 1892.

== Feminism struggle and pacifism ==
In 1892, Léonie La Fontaine joined the Belgian League for the Rights of Women, as a treasurer and responsible of the charity. From the year 1893, Léonie La Fontaine participated in the production of entries to the Universal Bibliographic Repertory Paul Otlet and Henri La Fontaine. In 1895, she joined the International Union of Women for Peace, engaging in pacifism. In 1924, she set up the Belgian section of the Women's International League for Peace and Freedom.

== Hommage ==
The Women’s University (Université des Femmes), French association for the promotion of gender studies in Belgium named its library Bibliothèque Léonie La Fontaine.

== See also ==
- List of peace activists

== Bibliography ==
- Stéphanie Manfroid, Léonie La Fontaine (1857–1949): une femme dans l'aventure documentaire, dans AIDA informazioni, Associazione Italiana Documentazione Avanzata, n° 1/2003, Roma, p. 39–45.
- Éliane Gubin, Leen Van Molle, Femmes et politique en Belgique, Éditions Racine, Bruxelles, 1998.
- Stéphanie Manfroid, Une femme entre deux utopies: Léonie La Fontaine (1857–1949), dans Utopies du lieu commun, le mythe comme lieu commun de la tradition et de la création. Saint Georges et le dragon, n° 95, 96–97, Mons, 2000, pp. 157–168.
- Eliane Gubin, Dictionnaire des femmes belges XIXe et XXe siècles, Racine, Bruxelles, 2006, pp. 353–355.
