= Fernande Baetens =

Fernande Baetens (1901 Antwerp – 1977) was a 20th-century Belgian Catholic feminist jurist. In 1930, she joined the National Council of Belgian Women (CNFB). She became assistant to the National Secretary in 1933 and took part in the International Council of Women (CIF) in Stockholm. In 1935, she was appointed National Secretary of the CNFB and Vice President until 1957. She was particularly affected by the situation of poor families and advocated for the education of mothers at the social, civic and personal levels.
