= Jeanne Beeckman =

Belgian politician

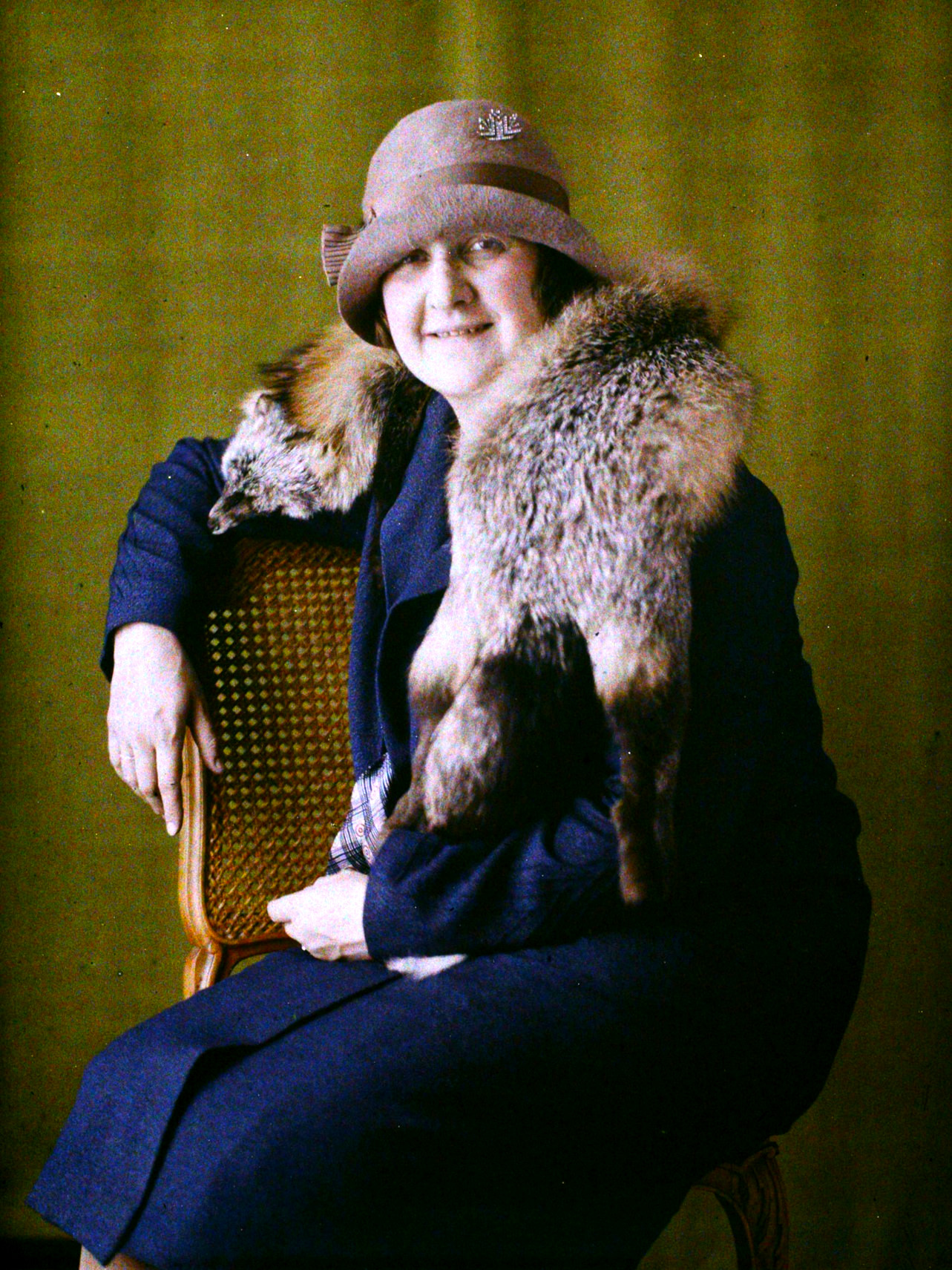
1928 Autochrome by Georges Chevalier

Jeanne Augusta Félicienne Beeckman (alias Jeanne-Émile, 8 December 1891 in Buenos Aires, Argentina – 20 April 1963 in Lausanne, Switzerland) was a Belgian medical doctor, socialist, feminist, and anti-fascist.

== Early life ==
Beeckman was born in December 1891, to Elise Beeckman, a feminist journalist, and Théophile Beeckman, a jurist. She spent the first four years of her life in Argentina, before her family returned to Belgium, where her parents divorced.

=== Education and medical career ===
She studied medicine in Brussels from 1908 to 1914, specialising in hygiene in 1921. She worked at Saint-Pierre Hospital and then Saint-Jean Hospital until 1923, including a period during World War I where she treated injured soldiers. At the hospital, she met Jean Thysebaert, another doctor, and married him.

From 1921 to 1949, she joined the penitentiary anthropology service of Forest, further specialising in neuropsychiatry, social medicine, and criminology. During the 1930s, she also worked for the Le Bon Marché store's medical service.

== Political career ==
Her political career was marked by socialist and feminist ideals, fighting in favour of human rights and against fascism.

=== As a politician ===
After divorcing Thysebaert, Beeckman married Émile Vandervelde in October 1927. Vandervelde would then introduce her to the Belgian Labour Party. When he became Minister of Public Health in 1936, she served as the head of his cabinet office.

In 1938, the same year Vandervelde died, she was also elected to the Brussels City Council. However, she was only able to take up the position in 1944, after the Liberation of Belgium in World War II. During the War, she was a member of the underground Belgian Socialist Party.

In 1946, she was elected to the Belgian Senate, a post she would hold until her death in 1963.

=== As an activist ===
During her marriage with Émile Vandervelde, they undertook a number of travels to study carceral systems. She also fought in favour of public education and maternity rights, as well as against the closure of the Hôpital Brugmann when serving on the Commission d'assistance publique.

While originally opposing the feminism practiced by her mother, which she saw as placing women as victims, she later grew to become a vocal proponent of feminism, especially from the influence of Marie Derscheid-Delcourt, who founded the Fédération belge des femmes universitaires (FBFU), and from her practice of medicine and socialist activism.

In 1919, she joined the Medical Women's International Association, participating in several annual meetings and becoming president of the Conseil national des femmes belges in 1934. She was also a member of the Groupement belge de la Porte ouverte, which fought for women's right to work, taking part in protests against laws that restricted married women from working, in favour of women's right to vote, for greater access for women to take up careers in male-dominated professions, such as the military. After World War II, she became involved in family planning movements.

== Death and legacy ==
She died in Lausanne on 20 April 1963, in the middle of an Inter-Parliamentary Union conference which she was attending. She is buried in the Brussels Cemetery in Evere.

In 1997, the King Baudouin Foundation created a financial support fund for initiatives to help people suffering from sensory disabilities named after her.

== Awards ==
Beeckman was awarded decorations by the governments of Belgium, Poland, and Italy.

- Civic Cross 1st class
- Knight of the Order of Leopold II (1958)
- Knight of the Order of the Crown (Belgium) (1948)
- Medal of the Armed Resistance (1956)
- Knight of the Order of Polonia Restituta
- Commander of the Order of Merit of the Italian Republic
