= Georgette Ciselet =

Belgian lawyer and politician (1900–1983)

- Born: August 21, 1900; Antwerp
- Died: August 30, 1983 (aged 83); Braine-l'Alleud

Georgette Ciselet (21 August 1900–30 August 1983) was a Belgian liberal politician and lawyer. A member of the Liberal Party from 1925, she served on the Council of State from 1963 to 1972. She was also President of the National Federation of Liberal Women from 1945 to 1963, and chaired the Sixth United Nations Conference on Technical Cooperation (1955) and the Third United Nations Conference on Social Issues and Refugees (1959).

Ciselet was actively involved in the feminist movement, advocating for professional and intellectual equality for women. She was a member of the Union des femmes coloniales and of the International Council of Women, and took part in the Belgian delegation to the United Nations Economic and Social Council in 1952–1953. Following a visit to the Congo, she denounced the precarious situation of African women, and in December 1960 participated in a United Nations congress on the emancipation of African women in Addis Ababa. In addition, on 25 September 2025, a street in Ixelles was named in her honour.
