= Marie Popelin =

Belgian advocate, educator, feminist (1846–1913)

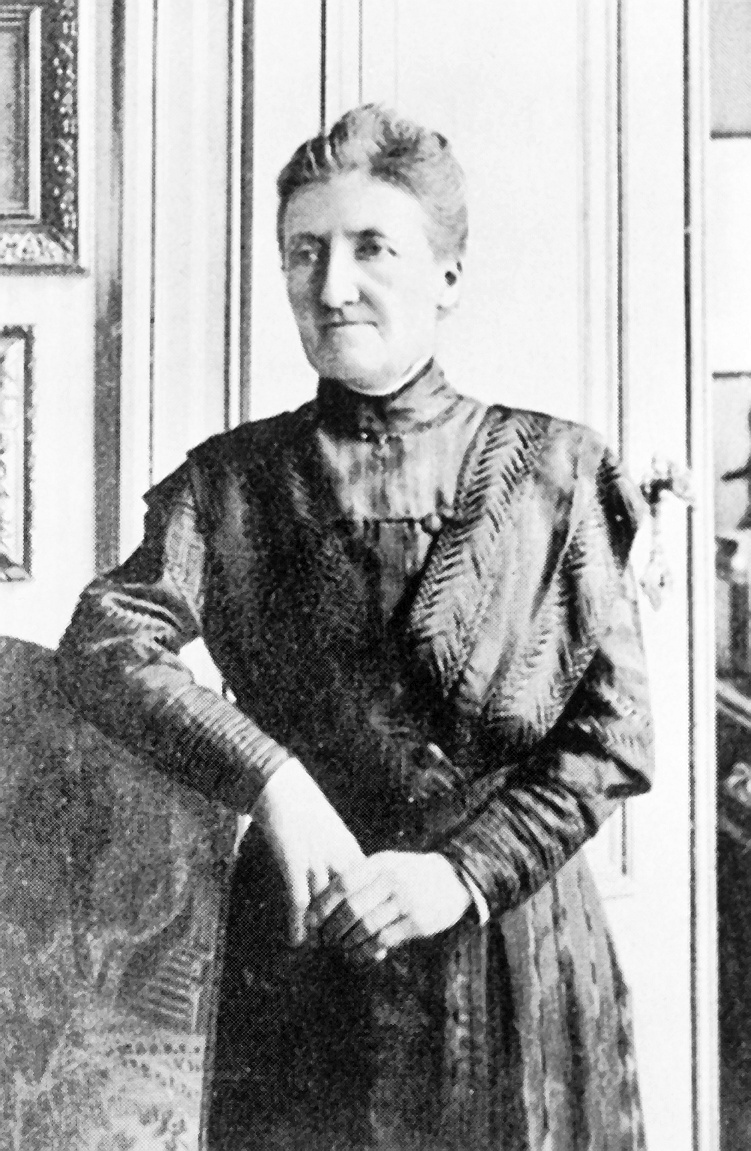
- Photograph portrait of Marie Popelin
- Born: 16 December 1846; Schaerbeek, Brussels, Belgium
- Died: 5 June 1913 (aged 66); Ixelles, Brussels, Belgium
- Occupations: jurist, teacher, political campaigner
- Known for: First woman to receive a law doctorate in Belgium

Marie Popelin (16 December 1846 – 5 June 1913) was a Belgian jurist and early feminist political campaigner. Popelin worked with Isabelle Gatti de Gamond in the development of women's education and, in 1888, became the first Belgian woman to receive a doctorate in law. After her accession to the bar was refused, Popelin went on to have an active career as the leader of the Belgian League for Women's Rights. She died in 1913 without ever gaining admission to the bar.

== Biography ==
Marie Popelin was born in Schaerbeek near Brussels into a middle-class family on 16 September 1846. One of her brothers was a doctor, another an army officer—Marie Popelin was well educated by the standards of the time and place. Along with her sister Louise, she taught in Brussels at an institution run by the leading feminist teacher Isabelle Gatti de Gamond from 1864 to 1875. Disagreements with Gatti led to the sisters moving to Mons to run a new school for girls there, established with Liberal assistance. In 1882, Marie Popelin returned to Brussels to head the middle school in nearby Laeken, but was removed from her post the following year.

=== The "Popelin Affair" ===
At the age of 37, Popelin enrolled at the Free University of Brussels, studying law. Completing her studies as a Doctor of Laws in 1888, Popelin was the first woman to do so in Belgium. She applied for admission to the bar association (barreau) which would allow her to plead cases in the Belgian courts. Her application was refused, although no law or regulation explicitly prevented the admission of women to the bar. Her appeals to the court of appeal in December 1888 and, in November 1889, to the Court of Cassation were unsuccessful, but widely reported in the Belgian and foreign press. The "Popelin affair" (Affaire Popelin) demonstrated to the supporters of female education that simply providing young women with access to higher education was insufficient unless further, legal, changes were also made. The affair contributed to the transition from an educational feminism to a political women's movement in Belgium. Jeanne Chauvin, who obtained a law degree in Paris in 1890, was at first discouraged by the case, but was persuaded by the Belgian lawyer Louis Frank, who represented Popelin before the court, to apply for admission to the bar, and was sworn in after the French law was changed in 1900. In Belgium, women were only permitted to practice as lawyers from 1922.

=== Political activities ===
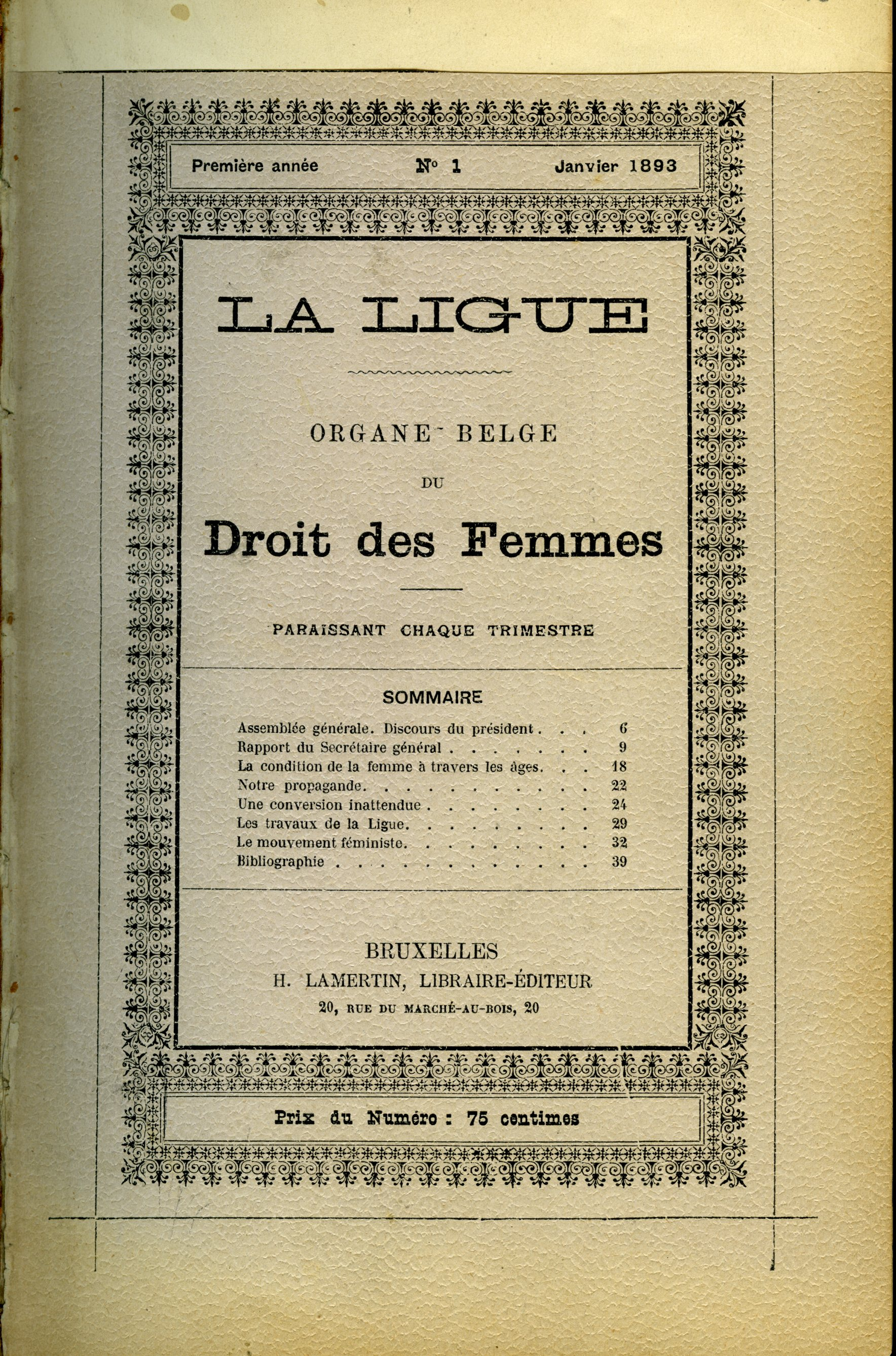
First issue of the review of the Belgian League for the Rights of Women (Ligue belge du droit des femmes), 1893

Marie Popelin participated in two feminist conferences in Paris in 1889, and established the Belgian League for the Rights of Women (Ligue belge du droit des femmes) in 1892 with the assistance of Isala Van Diest and Léonie La Fontaine. Popelin was a friend of American feminist May Wright Sewall, who she had met in Paris in 1889, and with Sewall's encouragement, the Belgian section of the International Council of Women was established from 1893. Popelin's efforts to create an independent feminist movement outside the scope of "pillarization", not linked to the Catholic, Liberal, or Belgian Labour Party, were only a partial success. The National Council of Belgian Women (Conseil national des femmes belges), created in 1905, received only limited support from the women's sections of the political parties.

In spite of this tepid initial reception, many of Popelin objectives were met before her death in 1913. These legislative reforms did not, however, include two of Popelin's most important demands: universal adult suffrage, and equal access to the liberal professions for women. Modern studies acknowledge Marie Popelin's central role in the creation of a Belgian feminist movement.

== Commemoration ==
Popelin has been commemorated in numerous ways within Belgium. She featured on a Belgian postage stamp during the International Women's Year of 1975, and a road in Saint-Josse-ten-Noode was named after her in 2008. In 2011, Popelin, together with the first Belgian female doctor, Van Diest, were depicted on the Belgian two euro commemorative coin for the 1st centenary of the International Women's Day. In De Grootste Belg, a 2005 Flemish television poll to find the greatest Belgian of all time, Marie Popelin was ranked 42nd.

On 16 December 2020, Google celebrated her 174th birthday with a Google Doodle.

== See also ==
- List of first women lawyers and judges in Europe
- List of women's rights activists
- Timeline of women's rights (other than voting)
- Timeline of women's suffrage

== Citations ==
=== References ===
- Albisetti, James C. (2000). "Portia Ante Portas: Women and the Legal Profession in Europe, ca. 1870–1925". Journal of Social History. 33 (4): 825–857. doi:10.1353/jsh.2000.0051. ISSN 0022-4529. S2CID 153728481.
- Carlier, Julie (2010). "Forgotten Transnational Connections and National Contexts: an 'entangled history' of the political transfers that shaped Belgian feminism, 1890–1914". Women's History Review. 19 (4): 503–522. doi:10.1080/09612025.2010.502396. ISSN 0961-2025. S2CID 144522751.
- de Bueger-Van Lierde, F. (1976). "Popelin, Marie". Biographie nationale de Belgique. Vol. 39. Brussels: Académie royale de Belgique. 733-742.
- de Bueger-Van Lierde, Françoise (1972). "A l'origine du mouvement féministe en Belgique. "L'Affaire Popelin"". Revue Belge de Philologie et d'Histoire (in French). 50 (4): 1128–1137. doi:10.3406/rbph.1972.2941.
- Mossman, Mary Jane (2008). "The First Women Lawyers: Gender Equality and Professionalism in Law". Honouring Social Justice. University of Toronto Press. ISBN 978-1-4426-9235-0.
- "New 2-euro commemorative coin on display in the Museum (2011)". National Bank of Belgium Museum.
