= Belgian League for the Rights of Women =

Belgian women's organization

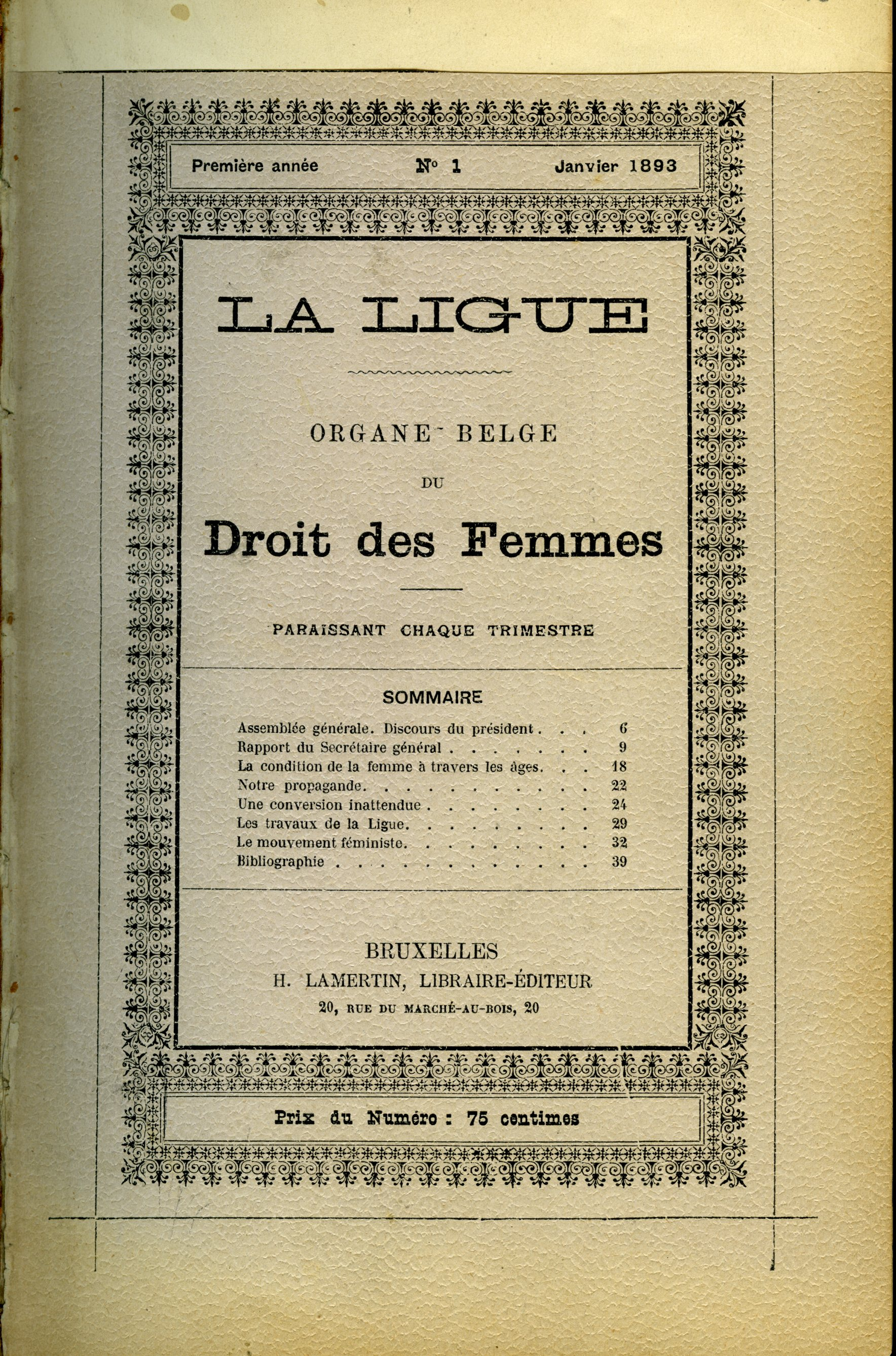
First issue of the journal La Ligue (January 1893)

The Belgian League for the Rights of Women (French: Ligue belge du droit des femmes) was a political association founded in Belgium in 1892. Established by Marie Popelin and her lawyer Louis Frank, it was created in response to the refusal to allow Popelin, a law graduate, to practice at the Bar. Based on the French Ligue française pour le droit des femmes, it immediately attracted 300 members. The organization was initially concerned with equal rights rather than women's suffrage but prioritized voting rights in 1912.

While she was in Europe in 1892 promoting the International Council of Women (ICW), May Wright Sewall contacted the members of the League with a view to inviting Belgian participants to the World's Congress of Representative Women to be held in Chicago in 1893. But it was not until 1905 that the League finally led to the establishment of the Conseil national des femmes belges, the Belgian chapter of the ICW.

From the start, the League published a journal, also titled Ligue belge du droit des femmes. It continued publication until the outbreak of the First World War, keeping Belgians informed of developments in feminism at home and abroad. The League experienced internal difficulties in the late 1890s when Isabelle Gatti encouraged a number of members to give political support to the socialists while Popelin continued to pursue an apolitical approach. Gatti and her friends finally left the League in 1899 when she joined the Belgian Labour Party.

In the early 20th century, the League was successful in obtaining the right for shop assistants to sit down in the absence of clients, in limiting requirements for them to work at night, and in preventing actions inciting them into debauchery and prostitution. Suffrage did not become a priority for the League until fairly late. It was only at the Congrès Féministe International held in Brussels in April 1912 that the League adopted voting rights for women as its top priority. The following year, Jane Brigode, the League's secretary called on all women's organizations to coordinate efforts on women's suffrage.

Efforts to revive the League after the First World War led to a few conferences in the 1920s but little more. By the 1930s, Belgian women increasingly devoted time and effort to their interest in pacifism.
