= Isabelle Gatti de Gamond =

Belgian feminist (1839–1905)

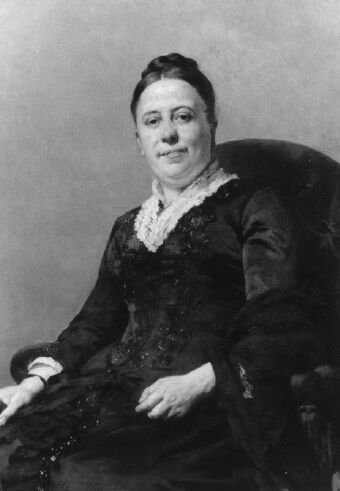
Painting of Gatti de Gamond by Cluysenaar

Isabelle Laure Gatti de Gamond (28 July 1839 – 11 October 1905) was a Belgian educationalist, feminist, and politician.

== Life ==
Isabelle Gatti was the second of four daughters born to Giovanni Gatti, an Italian artist, and feminist writer Zoé de Gamond, of Brussels. Born in Paris, her family moved to Brussels when she was five, having lost their fortune in a failed phalanstère—a utopian community inspired by the writings of utopian socialist Charles Fourier—at Cîteaux.

Her mother, an inspector of girls' schools, died in 1854, and the family's genteel poverty forced Isabelle to seek employment. She found this in Poland, working as a governess with a Polish noble family. During this time, she became an autodidact, teaching herself Ancient Greek, Latin, and philosophy.

She returned to Brussels in 1861 and continued her education by following public courses organised by the city government. Her ideas on education had already been formed, and in 1862 she launched the journal L'Education de la Femme (Women's Education), which championed the cause of schooling for girls.

In 1864, with the financial assistance of the city council, she launched the first systematic courses of secondary female education (Cours d'Éducation pour jeunes filles). Exceptionally for Belgium of the time, this venture was entirely independent of the Roman Catholic Church, and provided the very first organised secular education for women in Belgium.

The Catholic press opposed her work, but the school was a success. Among the teachers were Marie Popelin, Henriette Dachsbeck, and Anna-Augustine Amoré, mother of Marie Janson. The mayor of Brussels Charles Buls was a staunch supporter and assisted in the creation of an advanced, pre-university section in 1891.

Gatti retired from educational work in 1899 and entered politics as an activist for the Belgian Labour Party. Her work towards universal adult suffrage was disappointingly thwarted by the party's leadership, which suspended support for women's right to vote in 1901. They expected women to vote for the Catholic Party.

== Legacy ==
In 2005 polls held by Belgian TV stations to find the greatest Belgians, she was voted 55th in the Dutch-language series De Grootste Belg and 88th in the French-language programme Le plus grand Belge.

She is buried in Uccle, where the street she lived on now bears her name.
