= Eugénie Niboyet =

French writer and feminist (1796–1883)

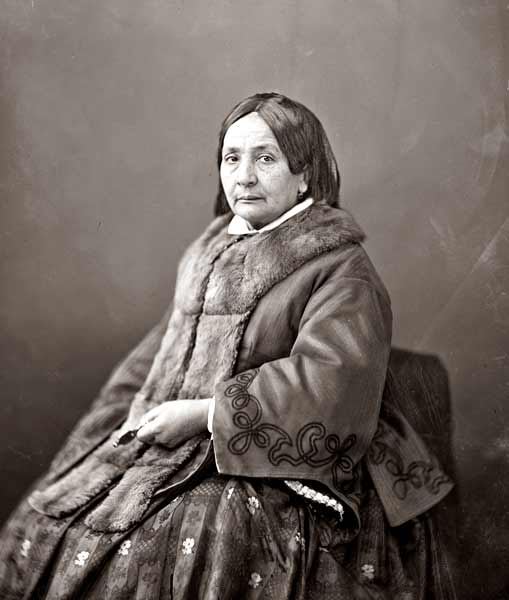
- Eugénie Niboyet by Nadar
- Born: Eugénie Mouchon; 10 September 1796; Montpellier, France
- Died: 6 January 1883 (age 87); Paris, France
- Other name: Eugénie Mouchon-Niboyet
- Occupations: Writer; journalist; translator; political activist
- Spouse: Paul Louis Niboyet
- Children: Jean Alexandre Paulin Niboyet

Eugénie Mouchon-Niboyet (September 10, 1796 – January 6, 1883) was a French writer, journalist and early feminist. She is best known for founding La Voix des Femmes (The Women's Voice), the first feminist daily newspaper in France.

She is a distant direct ancestor of Russian-Franco-American journalist Vladimir Posner.

== Biography ==
=== Youth and family background ===
Eugenie Niboyet, named Eugenie Mouchon at birth, was born on September 10, 1796, in Montpellier, France.(Poujol 2003, p. 243) Eugenie wrote about her own family background in the last part of her literary work, The Real Book of Women (Le vrai livre des femmes): "I come from a literate family with origins from Geneva, Switzerland," she wrote before emphasizing the importance of her grandfather Pierre Mouchon, an erudite pastor in Geneva and contributor to the Encyclopédie of Diderot and d’Alembert. Only afterward did she mention her father, who came to France to study at the Faculty of Medicine of Montpellier, and her mother by simply stating, "He married the daughter of a pastor from Gar," which indicated a Protestant origin. At the beginning of her book, Eugénie emphasized the importance of her family’s origins in Geneva, the importance of her father relative to new ideas from the French Revolution but also relative to moderation, and his "refusal of excess," which led to him having to take refuge in the Cevennes to avoid execution. (Note: Genealogical research conducted by her great-great-granddaughter Claire-Juliette Beale. Eugénie is the granddaughter of Pierre Mouchon via his first marriage to a woman named Jeanne Louise Elizabeth Richard, daughter of a tanner in Geneva. Eugénie's father was a son of Pierre Mouchon and Jeanne Richard. She is not related to Georges-Louis Lesage as she indicates in her biography. Her biographical error can be attributed to the second marriage of Pierre Mouchon to a woman named Marie-Antoinette Marguerite Sage and possible connections between Pierre Mouchon and the physicist.)

Her father raised her three brothers in "the respect and love" of Napoleon Bonaparte. Louis, aide-de-camp to the French General Teste, died in the battle of the Moskwa, Russia. Emile, (Note: Émile Mouchon was a renowned pharmacist from Lyon, author of Dictionnaire de bromatologie végétale exotique (1848).) a health officer, was taken prisoner in Dresden, Germany. During the Bourbon Restoration, the family lived in Lyon. Eugenie was marked for life by the arrest of some of her family members, and by her visits to the prison. That did not stop her from affirming that, "during that time, my religion was The Empire, my idol was Napoleon I."

Eugénie had two sisters, Aline and Elisa, to whom she later wrote: "We do not write for the narrow minds who want to confine women to the household. Women no longer have to buy their freedom, but to exercise it."

=== Marriage and motherhood ===
In her autobiography, Eugénie emphasized the commitment of her family to Napoleon as one reason for the choice of her husband: "As a Child of the Empire, I could not marry anyone but an imperialist." Eugenie was 26 years old at the time of her Protestant marriage to Paul-Louis Niboyet on October 8, 1822. Paul-Louis was a brilliant lawyer aged 30 years, and his father was Jean Niboyet, knighted in 1810 and loyal to Napoleon. The married couple resided in Mâcon, a town in the Burgundy region of France, where Paul-Louis practiced the law profession. On June 22, 1825, their only child, a son named Jean Alexandre Paulin Niboyet, was born.

=== Debut as a writer ===
Arriving in Paris on November 4, 1829, she began to make a living as a writer. In 1830, she participated in a writing contest of la Société de la morale chrétienne (the Society of Christian Morality). She focused on the theme of The blind and their education, her writing received favorable notices, and she ultimately shared the contest prize with M. Duffaut.

=== Society of Christian Morality ===
She joined the Protestant organization called the "Society of Christian Morality" and got involved in many social issues: prison reform; education reform; and the abolition of slavery in French colonies.

=== The Saint-Simonians ===
In 1830, the Society of Christian Morality shared its conference rooms with the Saint-Simonians. Eugénie attended the sermons of the Saint-Simonians and, inspired by their ideas, followed their movement with her husband and son, both of whom she persuaded to join. On July 20, 1830, Barthelemy Prosper Enfantin, one of the founders of Saint-Simonianism, appointed four women members of the college: Aglae Saint-Hilaire, Caroline Simon, Madame Collard and Eugenie Niboyet. They were charged with the responsibility of preaching to the workers but also to bring them aid and education. In 1831, Eugénie and Sebastien Bottiau were in charge of the Saint-Simonian section of the 4th and 5th arrondissements of Paris. (Note: Eugenie Niboyet and Bottiau monitored the industrial development of the 4th and 5th arrondissements of Paris. See the handwritten letter addressed to the "Fathers," dated February 12, 1831.)

The conflict between the two Fathers, Saint-Amand Bazard and Barthelemy Prosper Enfantin, and the desire of the latter to radically change the rules of sexual morality by establishing the community of women, as well as the schism between Bazard and the radically religious positions held by Enfantin, provoked numerous divergences between the two men. Eugénie ultimately distanced herself from the movement, but without disowning its ideas about the economy.

=== Debut of women’s journalism ===
With the Saint-Simonian proletarians, she was part of the group of women who participated in the first periodical written entirely by women: La Femme libre (The free woman), created by Marie-Reine Guindorf and Desiree Veret.

=== Fourierism ===
Like the two founders and participants in the first issues of The Free Woman, she drew closer to the movement of the philosopher Charles Fourier, who presented the treatment of women as the truest measure of social progress. In particular, she went to meet with Flora Tristan.

=== Female publisher and Inventor ===
Back in Lyon in 1833, Eugenie founded the first feminist periodical outside the Paris region with a publication titled The Women's Advisor (Le Conseiller des femmes), a weekly without illustrations printed by Boitel, followed for a few months by The Lyonese Mosaic (La Mosaïque Lyonnaise). Then she participated in the creation of The Athenaeum of Women (L’Athénée des femmes) in 1834. She was Editor in Chief of Peace of the two worlds, echo of peace, commerce, industry, sciences, literature and arts society" (La Paix des deux mondes, écho des sociétés de la paix, du commerce, de l'industrie, des sciences, de la littérature et des arts) from 15 February to 17 October 1844.

In July 1836, back in Paris, Eugénie founded The Gazette of Women (La Gazette des femmes) with the help of friends such as Charles Fredric Herbinot de Mauchamps. A sort of club, bringing together editors and subscribers, met to support and manage the newspaper, but also to discuss particular issues including the struggle for political and civil rights of women. Eugénie gathered many women during these weekly meetings on Thursdays at 27 Rue Lafite. There one could meet Flora Tristan, Hortense Allart, Anais Segalas and many other feminists.

In July 1838 she also obtained a 10 year patent for an indelible ink.

=== Militant feminist politics ===
The revolution of 1848 gave new hope to feminism, including the lifting of restrictions on meetings, thereby allowing the development of groups that advocated for women's rights.

In March 1848, Eugénie Niboyet founded and ran a newspaper dealing only with women’s issues. The Voice of Women (La Voix des femmes), subtitled "a socialist and political newspaper representing all women’s interests," was the first French feminist daily newspaper. Following the model of the club of The Gazette of Women (La Gazette des femmes), The Voice of Women soon joined a political club which included many feminists already involved with small pre-existing publications. Eugénie managed to assemble many women already involved in the feminist struggle such as Jeanne Deroin, Desiree Gay, Suzanne Voilquin, Elisa Lemonnier, and Anais Segalas, but also popular authors such as Gabrielle Soumet, Amelie Prai, and Adèle Esquiros. This movement was no longer reserved only for women as men also contributed, such as Jean Mace and Paulin Niboyet, Eugénie’s son.

The club promoted a very large catalog of reforms favorable to women, as much in the domestic realm as in the political. Extending the right to vote to all men provoked a resounding initiative when, on April 6, The Voice of Women nominated the candidacy of George Sand to the French Constituent Assembly. Sand disavowed this initiative and harshly judged these women whom she claimed not to know. Satirical cartoonists lampooned Eugénie and the journalists of The Voice of Women. The brouhaha created by this matter was overwhelming, such that people turned against the promoters of this initiative, and the government decided to end women's clubs. On June 20, Eugénie Niboyet, discouraged and hurt, ceased publication of The Voice of Women, and the feminists dispersed to avoid repression.

=== End of life ===
Eugenie Niboyet retired from public life and went into exile in Geneva, where she lived with difficulty doing translations of Charles Dickens and children's books published by Lydia Maria Child and Maria Edgeworth. Nevertheless, she took up the pen again after the "Paris Commune" to support requests for pardons of convicts.

In 1860, Eugénie Niboyet returned to France, where she published The True Book of Women (Le Vrai livre des femmes) in 1863. Her letters to Leon Richer, the editor of The Rights of Women (Le Droit des femmes), attest to the fact that she always remained interested in the feminist movement. In 1878, at the age of 82 years, she was honored at the feminist congress in Paris.

Eugénie Niboyet died in Paris on January 6, 1883.

== Publications ==
- De la nécessité d'abolir la peine de mort (The necessity to abolish the death penalty), Paris, Louis Babeuf, 1836. 35 p.
- Des aveugles et de leur éducation (The blind and their education), Paris, P.-H. Krabbe, 1837, 200 p.
- (Article) De la réforme du système pénitentiaire en France (The French penitenciary system reform), Paris, Charpentier, Leclerc, 1838.
- Dieu manifesté par les œuvres de la création (God manifested in the works of creation), Paris, Didier, 1842.
- Lucien, Paris, Langlois et Leclercq, 1845, 1 vol., 144 p.
- (Novel) Catherine II et ses filles d'honneur (Catherine II and her girls of honor), Paris, Dentu, 1847.
- Le Vrai Livre des Femmes (The True Book of Women) by Mrs. Eugenie Niboyet, E. Dentu, Paris, 1863, 245 pages.
- Les Borotin; La chanoinesse. - Une seconde Borgia (The Borotin; The canoness. - A second Borgia), Paris, E. Dentu, 1879, 223 p.

== Tributes ==
She is honoured in the names of:

- Eugenie Niboyet Nursery, 42 rue Joliot Curie, 69100 Villeurbanne, France.
- Allée Eugénie Niboyet, Saint-Nazaire, France.
- Allée Eugènie Niboyet, Lyon, France.

== Appendices ==
See Wikisource: Eugenie Niboyet.

== See also ==
The Role of Women in France in 1848 (Place des femmes en France en 1848)

== Bibliography ==
Chronological List

- F. Rude, "Eugenie Niboyet" article in A Fabulous Destiny, Flora Tristan [Un fabuleux destin, Flora Tristan], submitted by Sebastien Michaud, EUD, 1985, p. 143-143.
- Michèle Riot-Sarcey, History and Autobiography: "The True Book of Women" by Eugenie Niboyet in Images of Self: Autobiography and Self-Portrait in the Nineteenth Century, in the central review of revolutionary and romantic research, Volume 17, No. 56, Clermont-Ferrand, 1987, pp. 59–68 (ISSN 0048-8593).
- Michel Cordillot, An unpublished manuscript from Charles Fourier to Eugenie Niboyet, Cahiers Charles Fourier, No. 2, December 1991, pp. 3–8 Fourier site link.
- Maurice Agulhon, The Nineteenth Century and the French Revolution, Historical Society of the Revolution of 1848 and of Revolutions of the Nineteenth Century (France), University of Paris X: Nanterre, Creaphis Editions, 1992 pp. 207–216, 1992 Google Books link.
- Michèle Riot-Sarcey, Democracy-Resistant Women: Three Figures Critical of the Government, 1830-1848, A. Michel, 1994, (Google Books link).
- Genevieve Poujol, Feminism Under Guardianship: French Protestant Women, 1810-1960, Editions de Paris, 2003 (ISBN 978-2-84621-031-7), Google Books link.
- Flora Tristan, Stephane Michaud, Mario Vargas Llosa, Flora Tristan, The Pariah and Her Dream, 2nd Edition, Presses Sorbonne Nouvelle, 2003, pp. 53, 55, 65, 153, 312, 318, 319 (Google Books link).

== Sources ==
- Barry, D.H. (2005). "Ségalas, Anais née Menard (1819-95)". Encyclopedia of 1848 Revolutions.
- McMillan, James (2002-01-08). France and Women, 1789-1914: Gender, Society and Politics. Routledge. ISBN 978-1-134-58958-6.
- Mouchon, Émile (1848). Dictionnaire de bromatologie végétale exotique ... (in French). J.B. Bailière.
- "MOUCHON, Pierre - Pasteur genevois (1733-1797)" (in French). University of Montreal.
- Niboyet, Eugénie (1863). Le vrai livre des femmes (The True Book of Women) (in French). E. Dentu.
- Poujol, Geneviève (2003). "Eugénie Niboyet (1796-1883)". Un féminisme sous tutelle: les protestantes françaises, 1810-1960 (in French). Editions de Paris. ISBN 978-2-84621-031-7.
- Riot-Sarcey, Michèle (1987). "Histoire et autobiographie : Le Vrai Livre des femmes d'Eugénie Niboyet". Romantisme (in French). 17 (56): 59–68. doi:10.3406/roman.1987.4941.
