= La Femme libre =

French newspaper

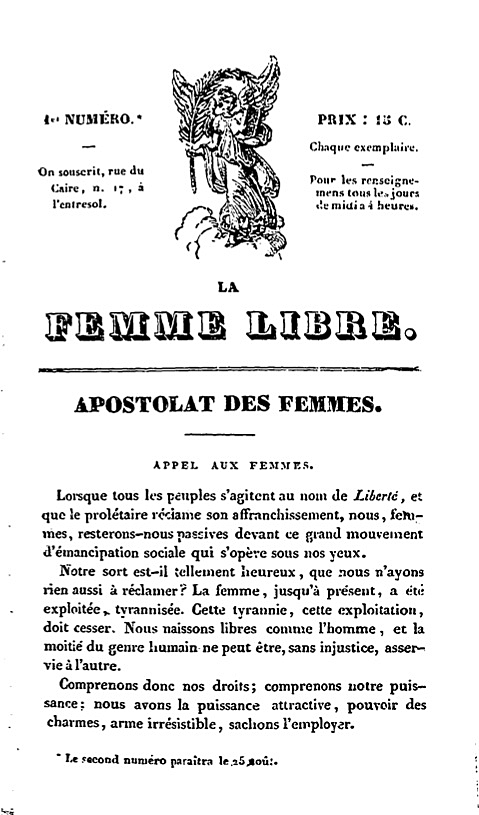
La Femme libre, no. 1, 1832

La Femme libre (The free woman) is the first title of a French newspaper published in 1832 by Marie-Reine Guindorf and Jeanne Desirée Véret Gay. It is the first French feminist periodical publication produced and published solely by women.

== History ==
A brochure, titled La Femme libre, announced a first publication scheduled for August 15, 1832. It underlines the originality of this publication by indicating it will be written and published by women, and by only including the first names of a founder and a director. The first names appearing on this advertising document are attributed to two young women who were recent activists within the Workers' College of the Saint-Simonian movement: the 22-year-old milliner worker Jeanne Desirée Véret Gay and the 20-year-old linen worker Marie-Reine Guindorf.

The first issue titled La Femme libre bore the subtitle Apostolat des femmes (Apostolate of women) but did not include a publication date. It consisted of eight pages, including the cover. There was a single article, titled "Appel aux femmes" (Call to women), organized into three parts, each signed with a first name. The first issue announced a second one to be published on August 25. The first signature, Jeanne-Victoire, is attributed to a linen worker who became a teacher, Jeanne Deroin. After pleading the place of women, she makes a link with the Saint-Simonian movement and Barthélemy-Prosper Enfantin, "Nous sommes libres et égales à l'homme; un homme puissant et juste l'a proclamé, et il est compris de beaucoup qui le suivent" (We are free and equal to man; a mighty and righteous man has proclaimed it, and it is understood by many who follow him.) She ends with an appeal to "Femmes de la classe privilégiée; vous qui êtes jeunes, riches et belles" (Women of the privileged class; you who are young, rich and beautiful) and to "Femmes de toutes les classes, vous avez une action puissante à exercer" (Women of all classes, you have a powerful action to exercise). This is followed by the two founders, Véret and Guindorf. To end this first issue of La Femme Libre, a postscript specifies the exclusively feminine character of the publication by excluding the possibility of an article written by a man.

This small feminist newspaper, a pioneer of the women's press, quickly evolved and continued its publication until 1834. Thirty-one issues were published.

== Titles ==
- La Femme libre (1832-1832) is the only one published with this title.
- La Femme nouvelle
- L'Apostolat des femmes
- La Tribune des femmes

== Notable contributors ==
- Marie-Reine Guindorf
- Jeanne-Désirée Véret
- Jeanne-Victoire Deroin

== Archives ==
Bibliothèque Marguerite Durand holds the publication's issues.

== Bibliography ==
- Ferrando, Stefania & Kolly, Bérengère, "Le premier journal féministe. L'écriture comme pratique politique. La Femme Libre de Jeanne-Désirée et Marie-Reine" (The first feminist newspaper. Writing as a political practice. The Free Woman of Jeanne-Désirée and Marie-Reine), in Thomas Bouchet et al., Quand les socialistes inventaient l’avenir (When socialists invented the future), La Découverte, 2015 (ISBN 9782707185914), pp. 104–12. (in French)
- Riot-Sarcey, Michèle, Histoire du féminisme (History of feminism), La Découverte, collection Repères, Paris, 2002. (in French)
- Voilquin, Suzanne, Souvenirs d'une file du peuple, ou La Saint-simonienne en Égypte (Memories of a People's Line, or The Saint-Simonian in Egypt), 1866. (in French)
- Wallon, Jean Revue critique des journaux : publiés à Paris depuis la Révolution de Février jusqu'à la fin de décembre (Critical review of newspapers: published in Paris from the February Revolution to the end of December), Bureau du Bulletin de Censure, 1849. (in French)
