= Suzanne Voilquin =

French writer, editor

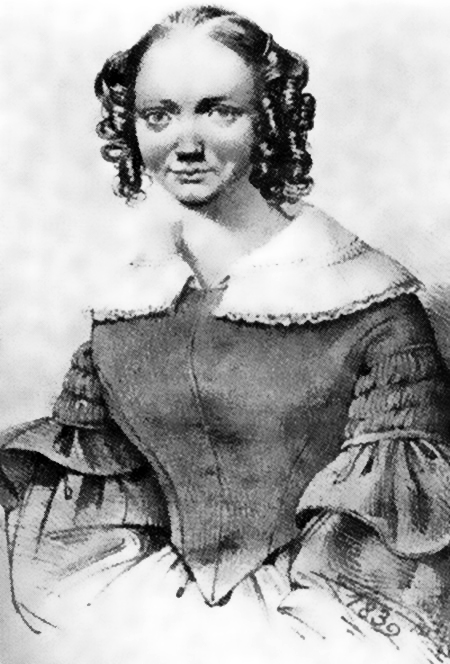
- 1839 portrait
- Born: Suzanne Monnier; 1801; Paris, France
- Died: c. 1876–1877; Saint-Mandé, France
- Occupation(s): feminist, journalist, midwife, traveller and author

Suzanne Monnier Voilquin (1801 – December 1876 or January 1877) was a French feminist, journalist, midwife, traveller and author, best known as editor of Tribune des femmes (fr), the first working-class feminist periodical, and her memoirs, Souvenirs d’une fille du peuple: ou, La saint-simonienne en Égypt.

== Biography ==
=== Early life ===
Voilquin (née Monnier) was born in Paris in 1801 to a working-class family. Her father worked in the hat making trade. She received some convent education, but spent most of her youth nursing her dying mother, raising her little sister and working as an embroiderer.

=== Marriage and Saint-Simonism ===
Voilquin met and married Eugène Voilquin, an architect, in 1825. The couple became supporters of Saint-Simonism, a Utopian Socialist movement that adhered to the philosophy of Comte de Saint-Simon. Its leaders included Barthélemy Prosper Enfantin and Saint-Amand Bazard. Voilquin was particularly attracted to the Movement's call to women and workers, “the poorest and most numerous class.” The Saint-Simonian's popularity and their belief in the liberation of women brought the group into trouble with the French authorities. After a spectacular trial, Enfantin, Charles Duveyrier and Michel Chevalier were jailed in 1832 and the movement dispersed. During this period, Voilquin suffered three miscarriages and her husband confessed to having had syphilis. He had also fell in love with another woman. Voilquin granted Eugène an unofficial “Saint-Simonian” divorce, since divorce was illegal in France, gave him her blessing and he left for Louisiana.

=== Tribune des femmes ===
From 1832 to 1834, Suzanne wrote for and edited The Tribune des femmes, the first known working-class, feminist journal (Its editors rejected the use of last names, as subordinating the women to either their fathers or their husbands). Voilquin and the other writers, including Marie-Reine Guindorf and Désirée Gay (Jeanne Desirée Véret Gay) stressed the need for women's rights to divorce, education and work. Voilquin, in particular, emphasized the need for the protection of mothers. In 1834, Voilquin also published Ma loi d’Avenir by fellow Saint-Simonian Claire Démar after she and her lover, Perret Desessarts, died by suicide.

With Enfantin's release from jail in 1834, Voilquin accepted the Saint-Simonian call to spread the word of the movement throughout the world. She announced in April, 1834 that she would join other Saint-Simonian women such as Clorinde Roge and travel to Egypt to work with the French medical doctors, scientists and engineers, including Ferdinand de Lesseps. Voilquin pledged herself to a “Life of Active Propaganda,” whereby she would support herself in an effort to show other women that they too could be independent.

=== Travels and a life of “Active Propaganda” ===
Work was scarce in Egypt where many people were quarantined due to the plague. Voilquin began assisting a French doctor who taught her medicine in exchange for her tutoring his Egyptian children. She studied Arabic and learned medicine in his clinic and the harems, often wearing Arab male clothing. Voilquin caught the plague, and, although she survived, many of her friends, including the doctor and his family died. After the plans for a woman's hospital fell through, Voilquin returned to France.

In France, Voilquin became certified as a midwife, studied homeopathy, and continued to work on behalf of women, with an unsuccessful attempt to form a Maternal Association to Aid Young Mothers in 1838. Work was again scarce, and, needing to support herself, her ailing father and her brother who was a political prisoner, Voilquin left for Russia in 1839. Life was difficult for her in St. Petersburg, where she found little employment, and the winter's cold affected her health. She returned to France in 1846.

Women's rights again surfaced with the French Revolution of 1848. Voilquin joined other feminists and Saint-Simonian women including Eugénie Niboyet, Pauline Roland, Jeanne Deroin, Desirée Gay and Elisa Lemonnier to organize on behalf of women's employment and education issues and to write for La Voix des Femmes. Voilquin organized wet nurses and founded a Society of United Midwives. With the failure of the Republic, lack of funding, and hostile government action, Voilquin once again left France—this time to Louisiana in 1848. There is little historical record of Voilquin's activities in New Orleans. She joined her sister there, who died in 1849. Voilquin returned to France in 1860. She published her memoirs Souvenirs d’une fille du people: ou la Saint-simonienne en Égypt in 1866.

Voilquin died in Paris in December 1876 or January 1877.

== Writings ==
- Mémoires d’une saints-simonienne en Russie (1839–1846). Edited by Maïté Albistur and Daniel Armogathe. Paris: Éditions des femmes, 1977.
- Souvenirs d’une fille du peuple ou Saint-simonienne en Égypte. Paris: Chez E. Sauzet, 1866.
- Souvenirs d’une fille du peuple ou Saint-simonienne en Égypte. Introduction by Lydia Elhadad. Paris: François Maspero, 1978.
- Tribune des femmes (Paris), 1832–1834, contributor and editor.
