= Adèle Esquiros =

French writer (1819–1886)

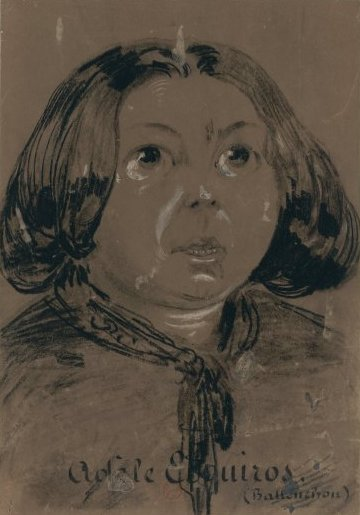
Adèle Esquiros by Nadar.

Adèle Esquiros, née Adèle-Julie Battanchon (12 December 1819 – 22 December 1886) was a French feminist journalist and writer.

== Life ==
Adèle Esquiros was born in Paris, the daughter of Pierre-François Battanchon, a medical student who died in 1860, and Marie-Rose Rouvion, a pensioner who died in 1844 and married in 1822. Esquiros had four brothers - Pierre-François (d. 1864), a music teacher in Libourne and then in Bordeaux; Gabriel-Félix, a professor in Geneva; Edmond, painter in Paris; and Henri, merchant in Buenos Aires. Her sister Émilie (d. 1864) married a certain Dubosc, a landowner at Le Puy. A teacher and poet, she met Alphonse Esquiros, a Romantic writer converted to socialism and republican ideas, with whom she married in Paris on 7 August 1847 and wrote several books: Histoire des amants célèbres and Regrets, souvenir d'enfance, before being abandoned by her husband in 1850.

During the French Second Republic, Esquiros was an active member of the Women's Club founded in April 1848 and the Society for the Mutual Education of Women, founded in August 1848, with Jeanne Deroin, Eugénie Niboyet and Désirée Gay. With Eugénie Niboyet and Louise Colet, she was the founder of two feminist journals, La Voix des Femmes (1848), then L'Opinion des Femmes.

Her most notable work is her response to Jules Michelet, L'Amour (1860).

A member of the Société des gens de lettres, she died in Paris in 1886, blind, paralyzed and in abject poverty, surviving only thanks to a meagre treatment of the Société. When she died, she left an asset of only 1827 francs.

== Works ==
- Le Fil de la Vierge, Paris, V. Bouton, 1845, 70 p.
- Histoire des amants célèbres (with Alphonse Esquiros), Paris, bureau des publications nationales, 1847.
- Regrets. - Souvenirs d'enfance. - Consolation. - Jalousie, (with Alphonse Esquiros), Paris, imprimerie de Bénard, 1849, 2 p.
- Un vieux bas-bleu, in Les Veillées littéraires illustrées, volume II : Choix de romans, nouvelles, poésies, pièces de théâtre etc. etc. des meilleurs écrivains anciens et modernes, Paris, J. Bry aîné, 1849.
- Les Amours étranges, Paris, A. Courcier, 1853, IV-349 p.
- Une vie à deux, by Alphonse Esquiros. La Course aux maris, la Nouvelle Cendrillon, l'Amour d'une jeune fille, l'Échoppe du père Mitou, by Adèle Esquiros, Paris, Lécrivain et Toubon, 1859, 48 p.
- L'Amour, Paris, 1860, 107 p.
- Histoire d'une sous-maîtresse, Paris, E. Pick, 1861, 138 p.
- Les Marchands d'amour, Paris, Pick, 1865, 224 p.
