= Anna Wheeler (author) =

Feminist writer

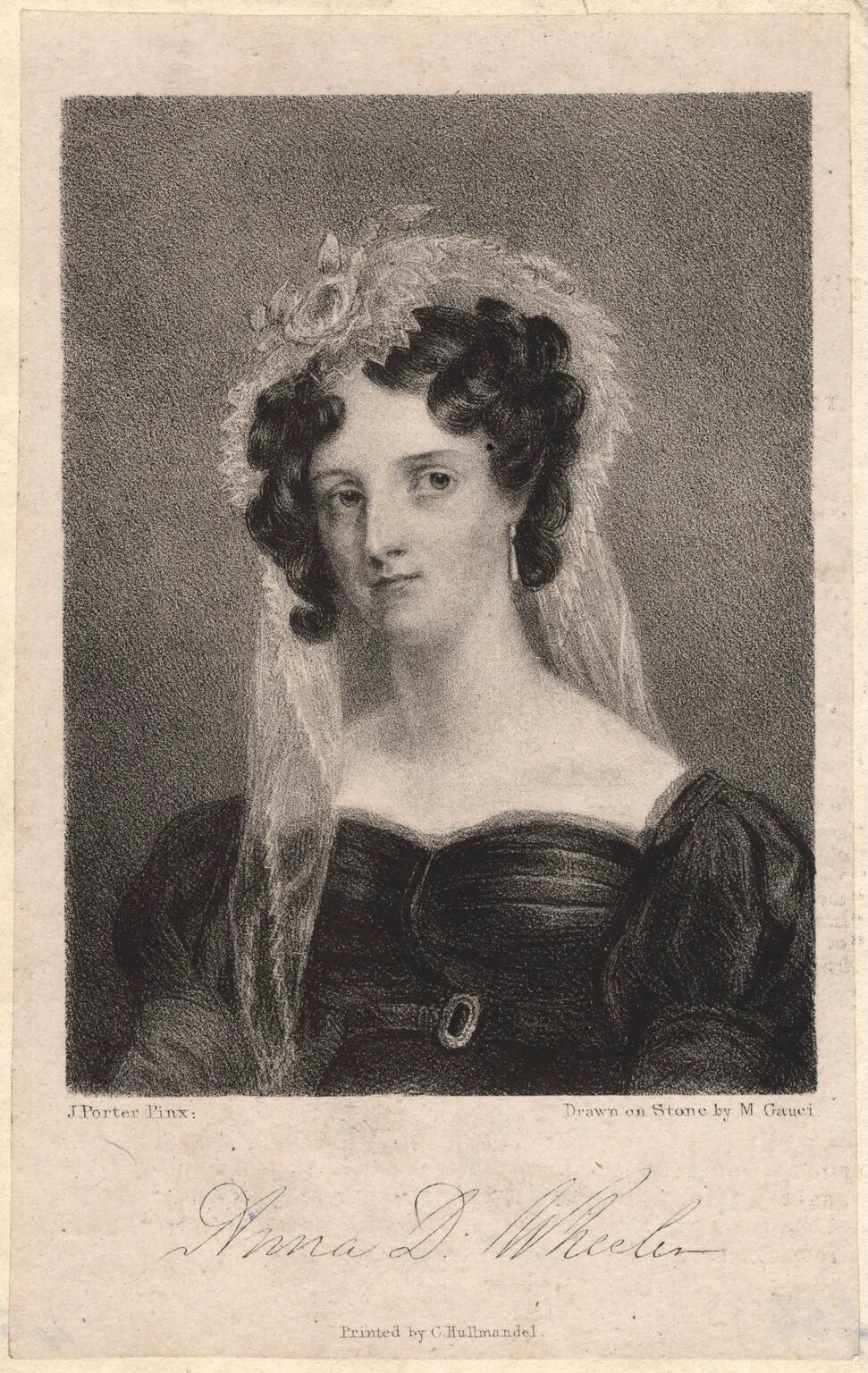
- Born: c. 1780
- Died: 7 May 1848 (aged 67–68); Camden, London, England
- Occupations: Writer and supporter of women's rights
- Spouse: Francis Massey Wheeler (m. 1795; sep. 1807)
- Children: Rosina Bulwer Lytton

Anna Wheeler (c. 1780 – 1848), also known by her maiden name of Anna Doyle, was an Irish writer and advocate of political rights for women and the benefits of contraception. She married Francis Massey Wheeler when she was "about 16" and he was "about 19", although the year is not known. They separated twelve years later. After his death she supplemented her income by translating the works of French philosophers.

She was an acquaintance of Robert Owen, Jeremy Bentham, and Frances Wright. The philosopher William Thompson described his book Appeal of One Half of the Human Race, Women, Against the Pretensions of the Other Half, Men, to Retain them in Political, and Hence in Civil and Domestic, Slavery as the "joint property" of himself and her.

A staunch advocate of political rights for women and equal opportunities in education, she was friendly with French feminists and socialists.

== Early life ==
Anna Doyle was the daughter of the Rev. Nicholas Milley Doyle, a Church of Ireland clergyman, Rector of Newcastle, County Tipperary. She had no formal education, but learned French, geography, reading and writing at home. In 1795, at about the age of fifteen, she married Francis Massey Wheeler, of Lizard Connell, heir to an estate at Ballywire, who proposed to her at a ball. Born in 1776, and a grandson of Hugh Massy, 1st Baron Massy (1700–1788) he was himself only nineteen, and they set up home in County Limerick. According to the autobiography of her daughter Rosina, Wheeler had five daughters, although a more general source says two. Her daughter Rosina Doyle Wheeler, who later wrote that she had been born in 1802, became the novelist Rosina Bulwer Lytton.

Wheeler read widely, taking in both the French Age of Enlightenment thinkers and Mary Wollstonecraft. Her husband was an abusive alcoholic, so she separated from him after twelve years by moving to Guernsey to live with her uncle, General Sir John Doyle then in post as Lieutenant Governor of Guernsey. In 1815 she moved to London, to benefit the education of her daughters. By 1816 she had started journeying through France.

One of her brothers, Sir John Milley Doyle (1781–1856) was a commander of British and Portuguese forces in the Peninsular War and the War of the Two Brothers.

== Later life ==
Wheeler's husband died in 1820 and left her penniless, so she supplemented her income by translating into English the works of Charles Fourier and other French Owenite philosophers. She managed to spend her life travelling, staying with friends and promoting the news and ideas of the feminist movement. She lived principally in London, Dublin, Caen, and Paris.

In London, she met Robert Owen, Jeremy Bentham and Frances Wright, and became close friends with William Thompson. In 1825, provoked by James Mill's dismissal of political representation for women, Thompson wrote Appeal of One Half of the Human Race, Women, Against the Pretensions of the Other Half, Men, to Retain them in Political, and Hence in Civil and Domestic, Slavery. Thompson described the book as the "joint property" of himself and Anna Wheeler. They were both advocates of the benefits of contraception.

Wheeler was one of the first women to campaign for women's rights at public meetings in England. She sometimes spoke at the South Place Chapel, "a radical gathering-place" then under the leadership of the Reverend William Johnson Fox and now better known as Conway Hall. Unitarians, like Quakers, supported female equality, and this chapel, situated on Finsbury Square in central London, gave her the pulpit to speak on "The Rights of Women". In this address of 1829, Wheeler forensically refuted arguments for male superiority and encouraged women to work together to create an organisation "to obtain... the removal of the disabilities of women and the introduction of a national system of equal education for the Infants of both sexes."

A staunch advocate of political rights for women and of equal opportunities in education, Wheeler was a friend of the French feminists and socialists Flora Tristan and Desirée Veret. In the early 1830s. she helped to establish the journal La Tribune des femmes. Her other friends and associates included Henri Saint-Simon and Charles Fourier, Suzanne Voilquin (editor of Tribune des femmes), Marie-Reine Guindorf, and Jeanne Deroin.

In 1833 William Thompson died, leaving Wheeler an annuity of £100, which was then enough to maintain a modest household.

== Publications ==
- William Thompson, Appeal of One Half of the Human Race, Women, Against the Pretensions of the Other, Men (1825); Thompson credited Wheeler with many of the ideas in this tract.
- Anna Wheeler, The Rights of Women (1830), published in The British Co-operator.
- Anna Wheeler, Letter from Vlasta (1833)

== Death and descendants ==
Wheeler was forced to withdraw from public life in the 1840s due to ill health, and she died on 7 May 1848 in Camden, London, having refused invitations to take part in the revolution in France of that year.

Wheeler's daughter Rosina Bulwer Lytton was a novelist and outspoken public speaker. Her grandson Robert Bulwer-Lytton, 1st Earl of Lytton, served as Viceroy of India from 1876 to 1880, and two of her great-grandsons became the second and third Earls of Lytton.

One of Wheeler's great-granddaughters was the sister-in-law of the Prime Minister Gerald Balfour, while another, Lady Constance Lytton, followed Anna's role model and became a leading suffragette protester, hunger striker and writer, and a third, Lady Emily Bulwer-Lytton, dismayed her parents by successfully proposing to the architect Edwin Landseer Lutyens and later became a Theosophist. The biographers Mary Lutyens and Jane Ridley (born 1953) are descendants of that marriage.

== See also ==
- History of feminism
