= Sheffield Female Political Association =

Earliest women's suffrage organisation in the UK

The Sheffield Female Political Association was the first women's suffrage organisation in the United Kingdom.

The reason as to why this group was formed was due to the 1832 Reform Act explicitly banning women from voting, as it defined a voter as a male person.

The group was founded in February 1851 by several Sheffield women who were also active in the Chartist movement, led by Anne Kent and Anne Knight. It also gained the support of Isaac Ironside's local Central Democratic Association.

The association passed a resolution written by Abiah Higginbotham in support of the suffrage of adult women, and persuaded George Howard, 7th Earl of Carlisle to submit this as a petition to the House of Lords. This probably inspired Harriet Taylor Mill to write The Enfranchisement of Women.

Later in 1851, feminist activists Jeanne Deroin and Pauline Roland wrote to the group for support while imprisoned in France.
