= Gustave d'Eichthal =

French writer, publicist and Hellenist

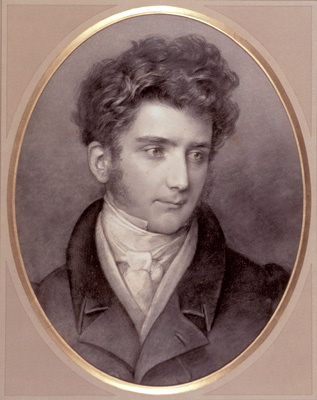
Gustave d'Eichthal

Gustave Séligmann d'Eichthal (3 March 1804, Nancy, Meurthe-et-Moselle - 9 April 1886, Paris) was a French writer, publicist, and Hellenist.

== Life ==
At the age of thirteen he became a convert to Roman Catholicism from Judaism, and when he left the Lycée Henri IV in 1822, he became a disciple of Auguste Comte, who initiated him into the doctrines of Saint-Simon (and later Barthélemy Prosper Enfantin), to the propagation of which he devoted a part of his fortune.

In 1832 d'Eichthal went to Greece, and on his return to Paris in 1836 published "Les Deux Mondes," containing his reflections on the Orient. He now began to advocate the use of Greek as a universal language, and published many works, among which were: "Les Trois Grands Peuples Méditerranéens et le Christianisme," Paris, 1864; "Origines Bouddhiques de la Civilisation Américaine," in the "Revue Archéologique," Sept., 1864, and April, 1865; and "Texte Primitif du Premier Récit de la Création," Paris, 1875; reprinted after his death under the title "Mélanges de Critique Biblique."

D'Eichthal was one of the chief founders (1881) of L'Association pour l'Encouragement des Etudes Grecques. After his death his son published his "La Langue Grecque," Paris, 1887.

Jane Welsh Carlyle, wife of Thomas Carlyle, described him as "a gentle soul, trustful, and earnest-looking, ready to do and suffer all for his faith".

He had two sons, Eugène Séligmann d'Eichthal, born 3 November 1844 in Paris, died 28 February 1936 in Paris; and Georges Séligmann d'Eichthal, as well as a daughter whose married name was Mme. Paul Le Bret. She had been a friend of Rosa Bonheur when they were both children, as their fathers had both lived briefly at the Saint-Simonian monastery at Ménilmontant.

== Writings ==
- Histoire et origine des Foulahs ou Fellans. Études sur l'histoire primitive des races océaniennes et américaines (1841)
- Les Évangiles (2 volumes, 1863) Text on line 1 2
- Mélanges de critique biblique (1886)
- Gustave d'Eichthal. La Langue grecque, mémoires et notices, 1864-1884, précédé d'une notice sur les services rendus par Gustave d'Eichthal à la Grèce et aux études grecques, par le marquis de Queux de Saint-Hilaire (1887)

Opuscules, mémoires et varia

- Lettres à MM. les députés composant la commission du budget, sur la permanence du système de crédit public et sur la nécessité de renoncer à toute espèce de remboursement des créances sur l'État (1829)
- À un catholique, sur la vie et le caractère de Saint-Simon (1830) Text on line
- Religion saint-simonienne. Rapports adressés aux Pères suprêmes sur la situation et les travaux de la famille, avec Stéphane Flachat et Henri Fournel (1831) Text on line
- Religion saint-simonienne. La Prophétie. Ménilmontant, le 1er juin 1832, textes du Père Enfantin, de Charles Duveyrier, Gustave d'Eichthal et Michel Chevalier (1832)
- Observations sur l'opération du remboursement au pair (1838)
- Lettres sur la race noire et la race blanche, avec Ismayl Urbain (1839)
- De l'Unité européenne (1840)
- Étude sur la philosophie de la justice. Platon (1863)
- De l'Usage pratique de la langue grecque. De l'Avenir du peuple grec et de la langue grecque (1864)
- Les Trois grands peuples méditerranéens et le christianisme (1865)
- Étude sur les origines bouddhiques de la civilisation américaine (1865)
- Mémoire sur le texte primitif du 1^{er} récit de la création (Genèse, ch. I-II, 4), suivi du texte du 2^{e} récit (1875)
- Notice sur la fondation et le développement de l'Association pour l'encouragement des études grecques en France (avril 1867-avril 1877), lue à la séance du 5 juillet 1877 (1877)
- Socrate et notre temps : théologie de Socrate, dogme de la Providence (1881) Text on line
- Correspondance inédite de Stuart Mill avec Gustave d'Eichthal, translation and preface by Eugène d'Eichthal (1898)
- Condition de la classe ouvrière en Angleterre (1828), travel notes of Gustave d'Eichthal, published by Eugène d'Eichthal (1902)

== Jewish Encyclopedia bibliography ==
- La Grande Encyclopédie, s.v.;
- Larousse, Dict. s.v.S. V. E.
