= Floresca Guépin =

French feminist and teacher (1813–1889)

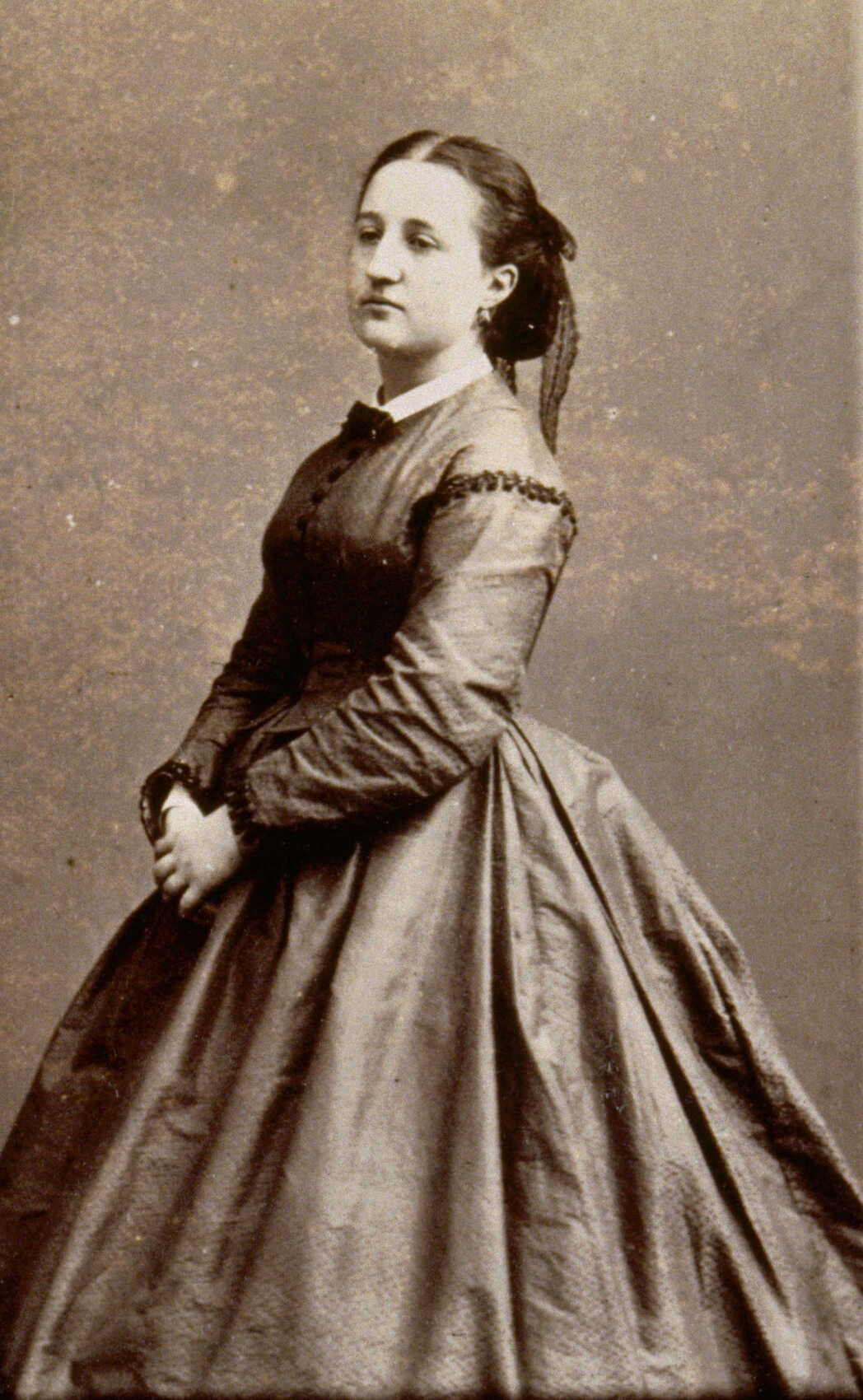
- Born: Floresca Clémentine Leconte; 26 March 1813; Sézanne, Marne, France
- Died: 11 November 1889 (aged 76); Nantes, France
- Occupations: feminist; teacher
- Spouse: Ange Marie François Guépin (m. 1854; died 1873)

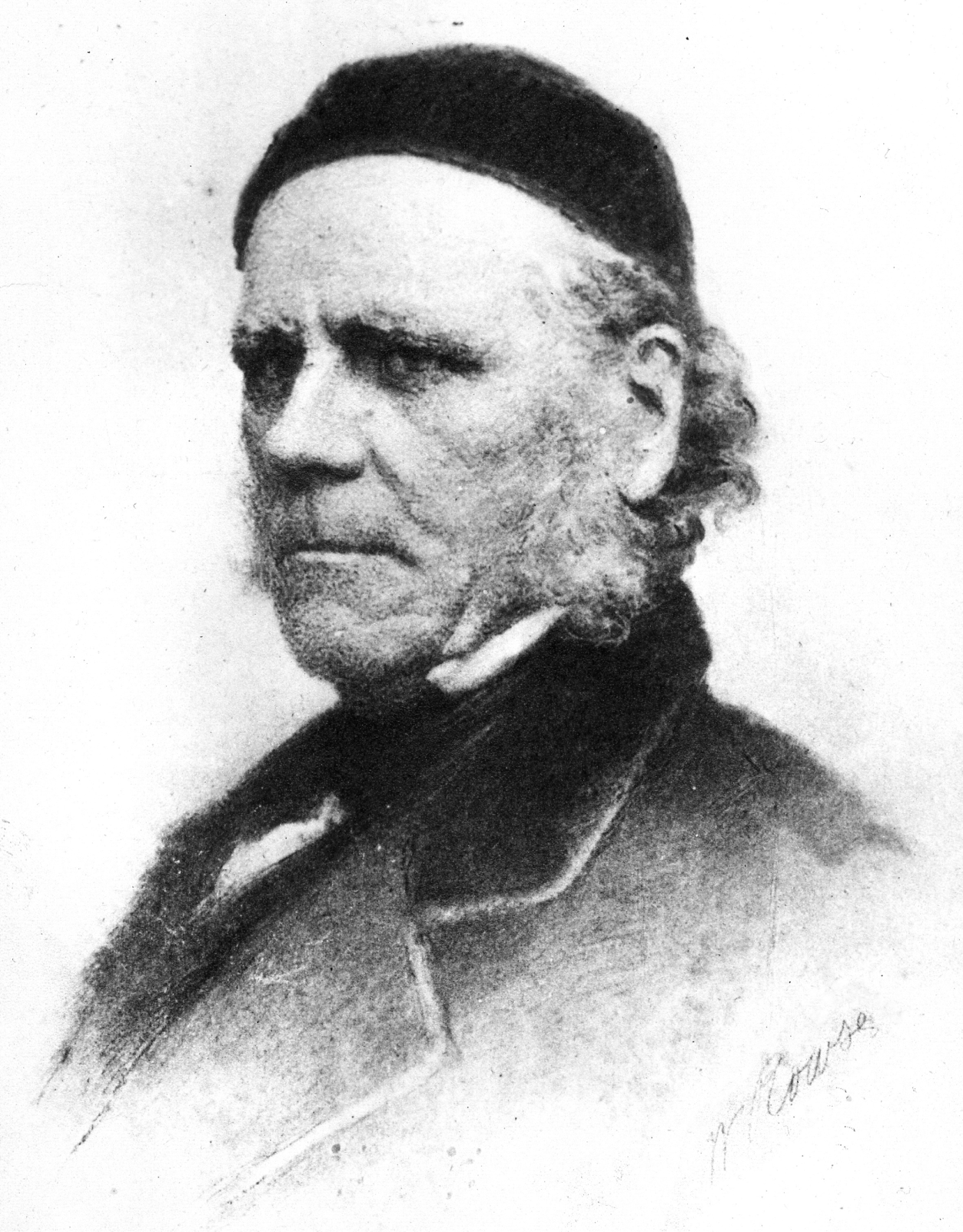
Ange Guépin

Floresca Guépin (née, Leconte; 26 March 1813 – 11 November 1889) was a French feminist and teacher. She co-founded the "Société Nantaise pour l'Enseignement Professionnel des Jeunes Filles" (The Nantes Society for the Vocational Education of Young Girls). "Médiathèque Floresca-Guépin", the media library in the Bottière-Chénaie district of Nantes, is named in her honor. Guépin died in 1889.

== Biography ==
Floresca Clémentine Leconte was born 26 March 1813, in Sézanne, Marne.

She met Doctor Ange Marie François Guépin (1805-1873) in a Saint-Simonian circle of friends in Paris. Floresca spoke English well and was in touch with several American families, including the Lowell-Putnams of Boston. During the summer of 1853, Floresca, Ange Guépin, and the Lowell-Putnams traveled to Brittany, including Nantes, the Lowell-Putnams having an interest in the history of Nantes, in particular the period of the Reign of Terror. There, they met Jules Michelet who was then in exile.

On 1 December 1854, Floresca married Ange Guépin, and became step-mother to his children, Ange Victor (b. 1831) and Marie (b. 1838). From 1858, they lived at L'Oisillière near Savenay. Floresca Guépin, a friend of André Léo, a feminist militant and future communarde, introduced him to Grégoire Bordillon. In these years, she influenced those around her to support abolitionism.

In January 1870, with her husband and Prosper Vial, a metals trader, Guépin co-founded the "Société Nantaise pour l'Enseignement Professionnel des Jeunes Filles", which ran first two and later three secular workshop schools, modeled on the school established by their friend, Élisa Lemonnier, in 1862, in Paris. After she was widowed in 1873, Guépin directed the workshop schools for several years. These workshop schools were behind the future Vial et Guépin technical school in Nantes.

== Death and legacy ==
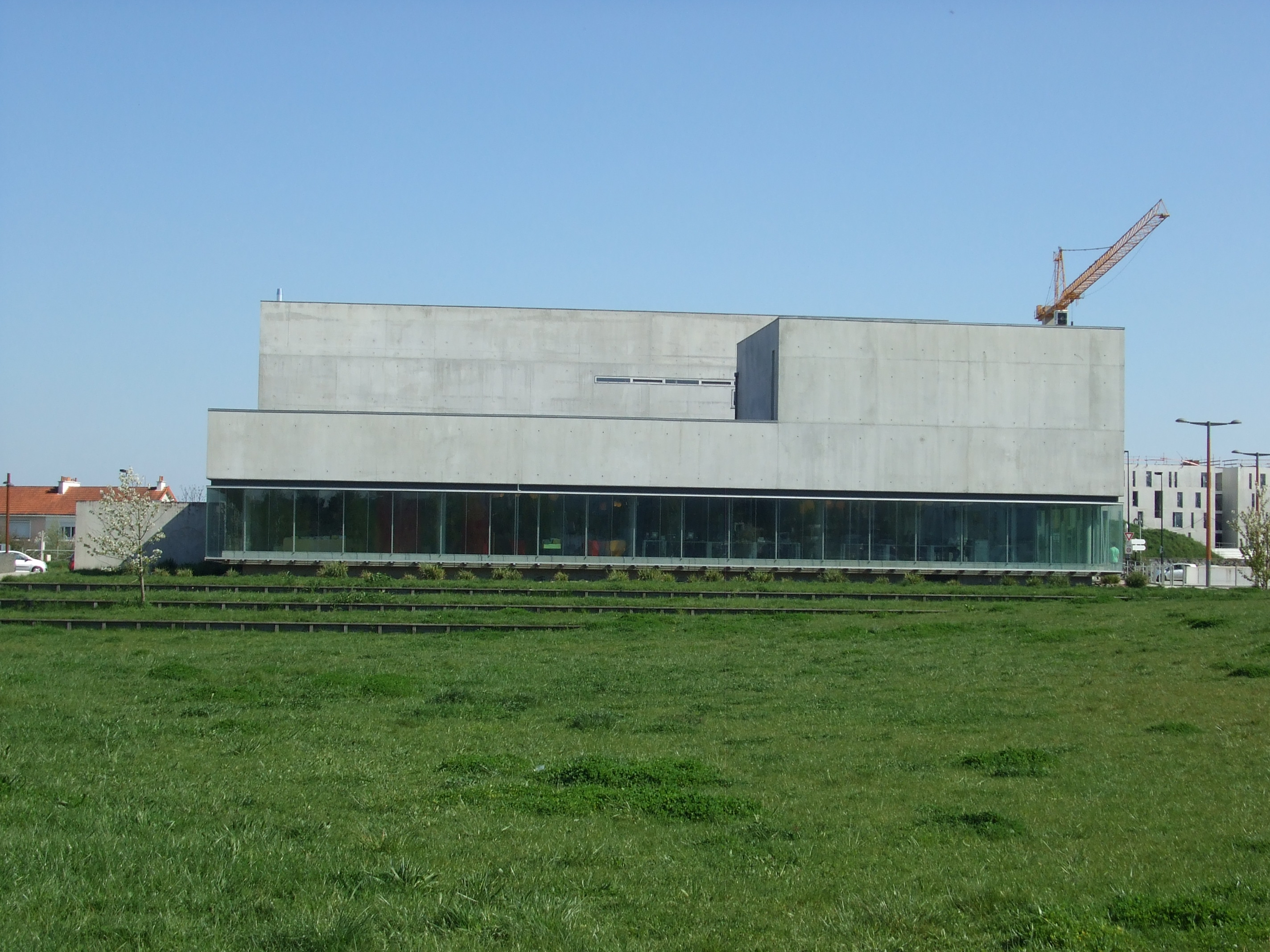
Médiathèque Floresca-Guépin

Floresca Guépin died 11 November 1889, in Nantes. The media library of the Bottière-Chénaie district in Nantes, opened in June 2007, is named in her honor.
