= La Voix des Femmes =

La Voix des Femmes may refer to:

- La Voix des Femmes (France, 1848), feminist periodical
- La Voix des femmes (France, 1917), feminist periodical
