= Anna Wheeler =

Anna Wheeler may refer to:

- Anna Wheeler (author) (1780–1848), previously Anna Doyle, Anglo-Irish writer and supporter of women's rights
- Anna Johnson Pell Wheeler (1883–1966), American mathematician
