= Claire Démar =

French feminist writer (1799–1833)

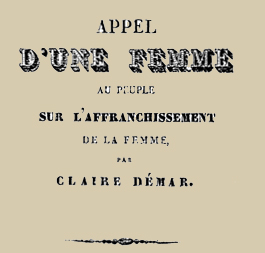
Her book, Appeal of a woman to the people on the enfranchisement of women

Claire Démar (1799–1833), was a feminist, journalist and writer, member of the Saint-Simonian movement. The avant-garde nature of her writings has led to her current recognition.

Her biography remains obscure. Her name according to some sources is Émilie d'Eymard: she signed her first letters as Émilie d'Eymard but her first publications as Claire Démar. Her birth date of 1799 is also uncertain, She died in 1833. Her father may have been the pianist and composer of German origins Sebastian Demar, with her mother being Elisabeth Riesam, also of German origin . They had settled in Orléans in 1791, but apparently no birth was recorded in that city's vital statistics for the year 1799 (Year VII-Year VIII, nor in the corresponding decennial table). The couple's daughter named Demar Theresia (Thérèse), harpist and composer (who was her elder sister) was born in Gernsbach, (Germany) in 1786.

Démar was one of the most combative women of Saint-Simonian movement. She used the Saint-Simonian movement to go further and express findings and claims that were rejected by a majority of her contemporaries, but became accepted by feminists during following years. Shortly before her death, she published a Appel d'une femme au peuple sur l'affranchissement de la femme ("Appeal of a woman to the people on the enfranchisement of women") which calls for the application to women of the Declaration of the Rights of Man and of the Citizen. She also describes marriage as legalized prostitution.

During the last years of her short life, Claire Demar participated in feminist journals created during the opportunity offered by the revolution of 1830, She became associated with the feminist journalist Suzanne Voilquin in her publications La femme nouvelle, L'Apostolat des femmes, et La Tribune des femmes.

Démar was preparing to publish a second book, she committed suicide in Paris with her lover Perret Desessarts. They were found on the same bed with two letters and a roll of paper, which she had asked to be read in the Saint-Simonian society of Paris and then given to Barthélemy Prosper Enfantin, who sent the papers to Suzanne Voilquin who published them in La Tribune des femmes.

== Reading of James Henry Lawrence ==
Démar's last text, Ma loi d'avenir ("My law of the future"), was written in response to the reservations expressed by Suzanne Voilquin about the English writer James Henry Lawrence, author of the utopian novel The Empire of the Nairs, which imagines a society without marriage or fatherhood, in which name, descent and inheritance pass through mothers. In "Considérations sur les idées religieuses du siècle", published in La Femme nouvelle in 1833, Voilquin held that such a system, resting on the secrecy of conception, would lead to "a coarse and disgusting jumble", and set against it publicity and trust as the foundations of the new morality. Démar, who had until then refused to write for a journal she considered too moderate, declared herself "painfully, grievously affected" that the editor should "let disapproval fall upon a word of emancipation"; she announced a reply, which soon grew into a pamphlet.

In it she openly defended "M. James de Laurence", the name under which Lawrence signed his French publications. Turning the argument of publicity against its author, she showed that publicity already reigned everywhere — in the publication of banns, in the marriage ceremony, in the police register of prostitutes, in judicial proceedings — and declared herself convinced of the need for "a liberty without rules or limits ... resting on mystery", which she made "the basis of the new morality, even were it to lead us to the jumble" that Voilquin found coarse and disgusting. Taking up Lawrence's critique of marriage, she denounced after him its criminogenic potential and refused to see in the love match any remedy for the marriage of convenience. Citing him again on the "beneficent mystery" that should surround conception, a condition of "the independence of women against the pretensions of men", she borrowed from him the idea of replacing paternal inheritance with "umbilical succession", but at once departed from him by demanding the abolition of all inheritance, in the name of "rank according to capacity, and capacity according to works".

From this discussion came the most original proposal of Ma loi d'avenir. If a woman was to owe "her existence, her social position, to her capacity and her works" alone, she could not be condemned to absorb part of her life in raising her children: Démar therefore proposed entrusting the newborn "to the arms of the social mother, of the nurse-functionary". She thus professionalised parental work that Lawrence had left to the women who bore the children.

Lawrence was aware both of Démar's writings and of her admiration for him. In the preface to the last French edition of his novel, Plus de Maris ! Plus de Pères ! ou Le Paradis des Enfans de Dieu (1837), he saluted the Saint-Simonian women who "discussed my system with marvellous talent", but called it "a triumph mingled with bitterness, for it was then that the unfortunate Claire Demar, as witty as Héloïse and more enlightened than Lucretia, perished a victim of her enthusiasm and of the false organisation of society". He closed the preface by quoting at length the passage of Ma loi d'avenir that invokes him, holding it to be the most forceful thing "ever to have come from the pen of a woman". There is no evidence that he ever met her: he spelled her name "Demar", without the accent, as it appeared on the cover of her book, and described her companion as her "lover", a characterisation Voilquin firmly denied.

== Publications ==
- Claire Demar Appel d'une femme au peuple sur l'affranchissement de la femme,1833, Valentin Pelosse, 2001. (ISBN 2226125817)
- Claire Demar, Ma Loi d'avenir posthumously in La Tribune des femmes, Suzanne Voilquin, Paris, 1834.
- Claire Demar (and Perret Desessarts), letters to Charles Lambert (3 August 1833), autographs stored at the Arsenal, Mss 7714, farewell letters written some hours before the suicide of the two lovers.

== Bibliography ==
- Revue de Paris 1834, p. 6 et 7
- Suzanne Voilquin, Souvenirs d'une fille du peuple, ou La Saint-simonienne en égypte, 1866, Maspero, Paris, 1978.
- Ghenia Avril de Sainte-Croix, Le Féminisme, Paris, Giard & Brière, 1907.
- Laure Adler, À l'aube du féminisme, les premières journalistes : 1830-1850, Paris, Payot, 1979.
- Carole Bitoun, La Révolte au féminin. De 1789 à nos jours, Hugo & Cie, 2007.
- Anne Verjus, Abolir le patriarcat. L'utopie féministe de James Henry Lawrence (1773-1840), Saint-Étienne, Presses universitaires de Saint-Étienne, 2025. (ISBN 978-2-86272-793-6)
