= Saint-Simonianism =

French political, religious and social movement

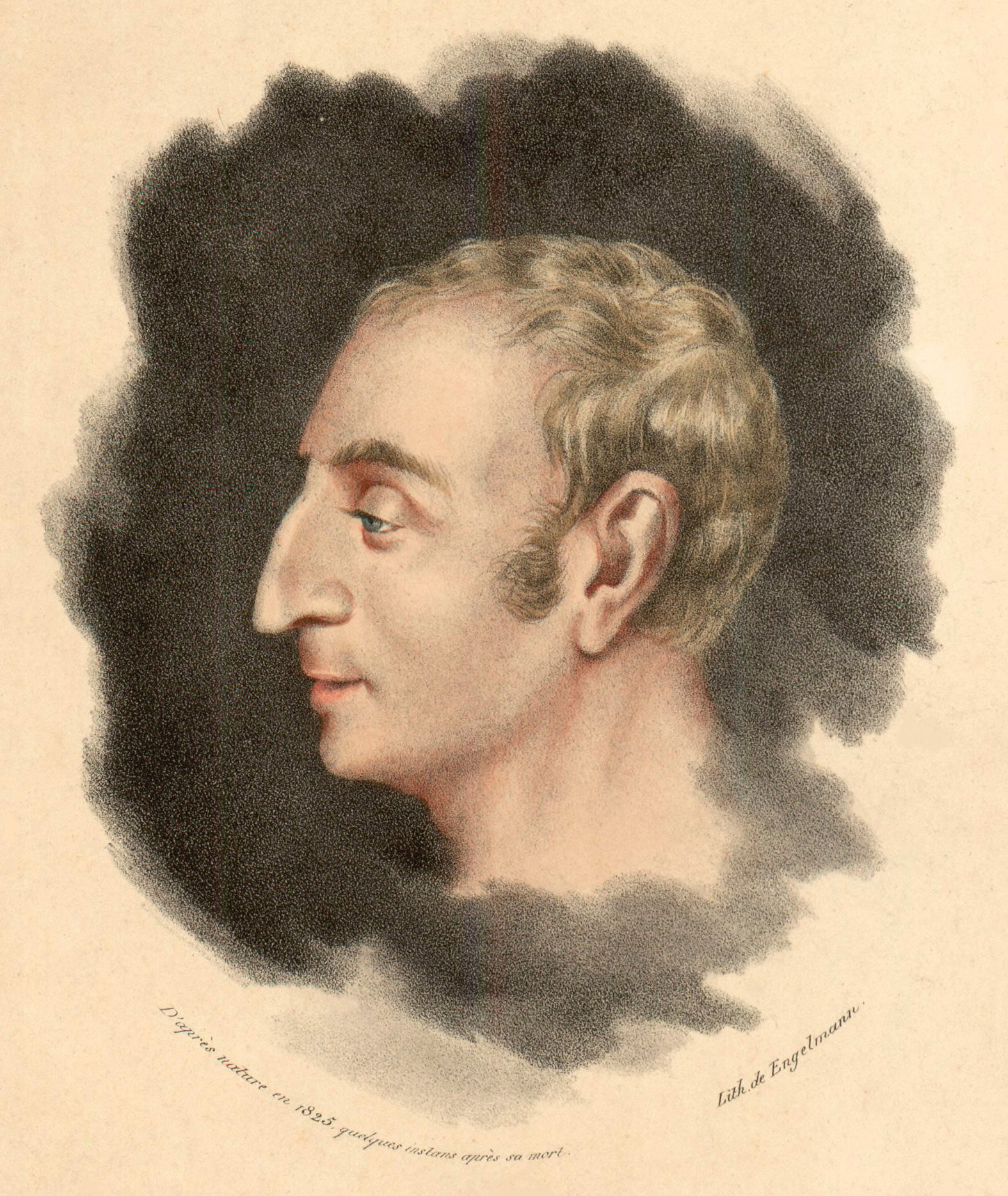
Claude Henri de Rouvroy, comte de Saint-Simon. Portrait by Godefroy Engelmann

Saint-Simonianism (/sænsiːˈmɒni.ənɪzəm/) was a French political, religious and social movement of the first half of the 19th century, inspired by the ideas of Claude Henri de Rouvroy, comte de Saint-Simon.

His ideas focused on the perception that growth in industrialization and scientific discovery would cause profound changes in society. He believed that society would restructure itself by abandoning traditional ideas of temporal and spiritual power. An evolution that would lead, inevitably, to a productive society based on and benefiting from, a "... union of men engaged in useful work", the basis of "true equality".

Saint-Simon discussed these ideas in a succession of journals such as l'Industrie (1816), La politique (1818) and L'Organisateur (1819–20).

== Saint-Simon's writings ==
Saint-Simon's earliest publications, such as his Introduction aux travaux scientifiques du XIXe siècle (Introduction to scientific discoveries of the 19th century (1803) and his Mémoire sur la science de l'homme (Notes on the study of man) (1813), (the latter of which is a eulogy to Napoleon), demonstrate his faith in science as a means to regenerate society. In his 1814 essay De la réorganisation de la société européenne (On the reorganisation of European society), written in collaboration with his then secretary Augustin Thierry, Saint-Simon seems to have foreseen the European Union, expecting however that England would take the lead in forming a continent sharing the same laws and institutions.

For his last decade, Saint-Simon concentrated on themes of political economy. Together with Auguste Comte (then only a teenager), Saint-Simon projected a society bypassing the changes of the French Revolution, in which science and industry would take the moral and temporal power of medieval theocracy. In his last work however, Le Nouveau Christianisme (The New Christianity) (1825), Saint-Simon reverted to more traditional ideas of renewing society through Christian brotherly love. He died shortly after its publication.

== The arts ==
In his last years and in the period after his death, Saint-Simon's ideas, which gave prominence to art as a prized aspect of work, interested numerous artists and musicians, amongst them Hector Berlioz, Félicien David (who wrote a number of hymns for the movement) and Franz Liszt.

== The movement after Saint-Simon's death ==
Following Saint-Simon's death in 1825, his followers began to differ as to how to promulgate his ideas.

In 1831 Barthélemy Prosper Enfantin and Amand Bazard purchased the newspaper Le Globe as the official organ for their revolutionary fraternity Friends of the Truth. Initially both men were supposed to be co-leaders naming themselves Supreme Fathers. However Bazard left the group as it became increasingly ritualistic and religiously minded with Enfantin founding a community at Ménilmontant where he decried marriage as tyranny, promoted free love, declared himself "chosen by God", and began predicting that a "female Messiah" would soon save humanity.

In 1832 the group led by charismatic Enfantin was brought to trial by the July Monarchy on charges of public indecency specifically in regards to Enfantin's beliefs and practices associated with free love. The group was later banned by the authorities in 1832 although it had already been suffering severe internal disputes. Following this some of Enfantin's followers visited Constantinople and then Egypt and influenced the creation of the Suez Canal in search of Messianic revelations, and the formal Saint-Simonian movement expired.

However, others who had been associated with the group and were not followers of Enfantin, (such as Olinde Rodrigues and Gustave d'Eichthal) developed Saint-Simonian notions practically and involved themselves in the development of the French economy, founding a number of leading concerns including the Suez Canal Company and the bank Crédit Mobilier. It has also been noted that Saint-Simonian ideas exerted a significant influence on new religious movements such as Spiritualism and Occultism since the 1850s. Karl Marx considered the Saint-Simonians to be the "patriarchs of socialism."

== People associated with the Saint-Simonian movement ==
- Amand Bazard (1791–1832), socialist
- Philippe Buchez (1796–1865), historian, sociologist, and politician
- Michel Chevalier (1806–1878), statesman, economist
- Auguste Comte (1798–1857), first philosopher of positive science
- Félicien David (1810–1876), composer
- Claire Demar (1799–1833), author, feminist
- Jeanne Deroin (1805–1894), author, journalist, feminist, seamstress, social reformer
- Gustave d'Eichthal (1804–1886), writer and publicist
- Barthélemy Prosper Enfantin (1796–1864), social reformer
- Simon Ganneau (1805–1851), sculptor, socialist, feminist, mystic
- Désirée Gay (1810–1891), publisher, feminist, seamstress, social reformer
- Henri Germain (1824–1905), businessman and founder of Crédit Lyonnais
- Floresca Guépin (1813–1889), feminist, teacher, school founder
- Charles Joseph Bay, explorer and engineer
- Suzanne Voilquin (1801–1876), author, editor, midwife, feminist
- Rosa Bonheur (1822–1899), painter

== Sources ==
- Butler, Eliza Marian. The Saint-Simonian Religion in Germany; A Study of the Young German Movement, New York: H. Fertig, 1968.
- Carlisle, Robert B. The Proffered Crown: Saint-Simonianism and the Doctrine of Hope, Baltimore: Johns Hopkins Univ. Press, 1987. ISBN 0801835127
- Durkheim, Emile.Socialism and Saint-Simon (Le Socialisme), Ed. and with Intro by Alvin W. Gouldner. Charlotte Sattler (Translator). Yellow Springs, OH: Antioch Press, 1958.
- Gerits, Anton. Additions and Corrections to Jean Walch Bibliographie du Saint-Simonisme, Amsterdam: A. Gerits, 1986. ISBN 9070775026
- Goyau, G. Saint-Simon and Saint-Simonism in the Catholic Encyclopedia, New York, 1912.
- Hewett, Caspar, Henri de Saint-Simon, the Great Synthesizer, 2008.
- Leopold, David, Saint-Simon, Claude-Henri de Rouvroy in E. Craig (ed.). Routledge Encyclopaedia of Philosophy, London, 1998.
- Osama W. Abi-Mershed. Apostles of Modernity: Saint-Simonians and the Civilizing Mission in Algeria. Palo Alto: Stanford UP, 2010.
- Pankhurst, Richard K. P. The Saint Simonians, Mill and Carlyle: A Preface to Modern Though, Norwood, PA: Norwood Editions, 1976. ISBN 0848220927
- St-Simon, "Letters from an Inhabitant of Geneva to His Contemporaries" at the Marxist Internet Archive.
- Shine, Hill.Carlyle and the Saint-Simonians: The Concept of Historical Periodiciy, New York: Octagon Books, 1971.
- Strube, Julian. Socialist Religion and the Emergence of Occultism: A Genealogical Approach to Socialism and Secularization in 19th-Century France. Religion, 2016.
