= La Voix des Femmes (France, 1848) =

French feminist newspaper and organization

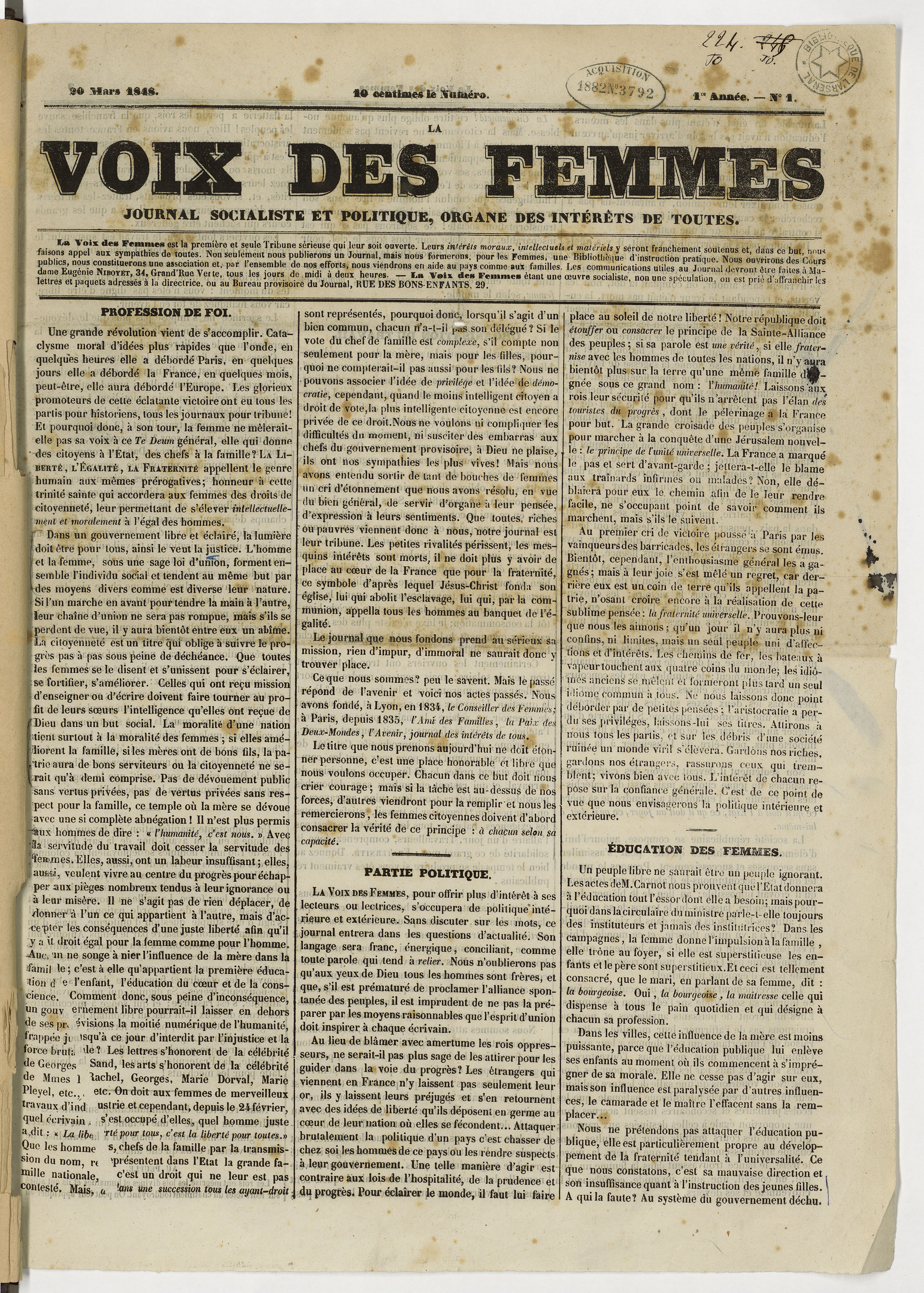
Front cover of the first issue on March 20, 1848

La Voix des Femmes (French pronunciation: [la vwa de fam], lit. 'The Women's Voice') was a French socialist feminist newspaper, founded by Eugénie Niboyet in 1848. It was the first female-led paper to be published daily in France, and grew to encompass an entire organization known as the Société de la Voix des Femmes. Some of its members included Jeanne Deroin, Suzanne Voilquin, Desirée Gay, and Amélie Pray.

La Voix des Femmes became the focal point for the Women’s Movement in 1848 as its issues, first published March 19 of that year, highlighted the struggles of all French women. The paper focused on both domestic and international women’s rights issues, including suffrage, labor rights, education, and personal autonomy. La Voix des Femmes ultimately ended in June 1848 due to disappointments with the government, as French workers and women suffered under its new repressive measures. Although the paper was founded to serve the demands of women, the atmosphere of 1848 and events following the February Revolution made publication too risky. Writers and members of La Voix des Femmes increasingly faced political persecution, and ultimately the publication was unable to endure past the June Days uprising.

== February Revolution ==
La Voix des Femmes was published three weeks after the February Revolution of 1848 as a response to the Provisional Government’s failure in upholding social promises and rights for women.

During the February Revolution, women of different ages and social backgrounds played a principal role; they were involved in the barricades and supported the Provisional Government. French women and men participated in the revolution and declared universal suffrage. The revolutionaries argued that the universal right to vote would end injustices and provide new jobs. Through their activism, women believed the new government would grant them the rights of citizenship. However, after the February Revolution concluded and the Second Republic was founded, it became evident that universal suffrage did not apply to women. French women were still excluded from participation in the Provisional Government. Many French women were surprised by this dismissal, as they were direct participants in facilitating the Second Republic. Eugénie Niboyet, along with other French women, were genuinely shocked that women were not granted enfranchisement in the republic’s new suffrage contracts.

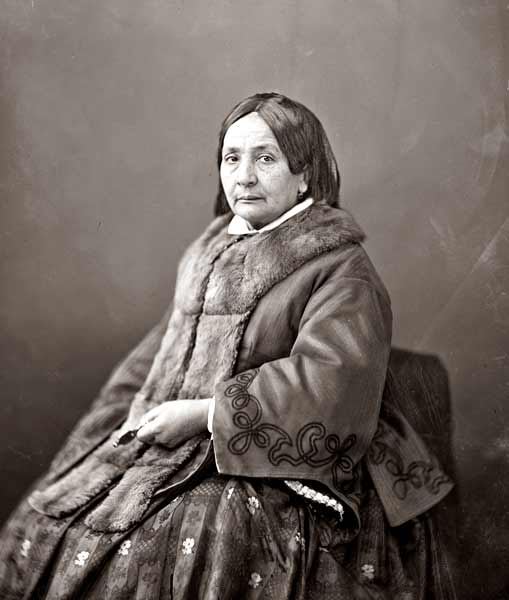
Eugénie Niboyet, founder of La Voix des Femmes.

Facing the disillusioned results of the revolution, women mobilized together in Paris. Led by Niboyet, women dispersed letters, petitions, and articles across France, to widen the definition of what constituted a French citizen and call attention to the issues they faced as women. Women launched their own campaigns focusing primarily on women's rights to education, divorce, vote, and work. French women demanded the Provisional Government to include women as delegates and called for the formation of workshops in Paris to provide unemployed women opportunities to learn new skills and gain employment. Through the women’s constant petitions, the Provisional Government’s Commission agreed to the demands weeks later and opened a national workshop. This workshop was located in the 2nd arrondissement and was led by women who would all later intersect with La Voix des Femmes. Notable women included Eugénie Niboyet, Pauline Roland, Désirée Gay, and Jeanne Deroin.

One significant result of the February Revolution was the Second Republic’s removal of earlier censorship rules. In both March and April 1848, hundreds of clubs and newspapers were able to open in Paris. Despite the new freedom of the press, attending clubs was risky for women. Debates within were extremely restrictive, and discussing women’s rights was interpreted as a daring topic. Eugénie Niboyet, Désirée Gay, and Jeanne Deroin saw this as further cause of separating women from participating in public debates. They, along with their friends, all possessed previous editor experience for working on earlier women’s journals, and discussed these social exclusions. It was through these discussions that La Voix des Femmes was founded as a publication to provide an outlet for women who were silenced in French society.

Women spent the spring months of 1848 through La Voix des Femmes demanding the Provisional Government and Republican men to recognize women’s autonomy. Many of the French women participating were earlier republicans and socialists in the movements of the 1830s, and were experienced in lobbying against the state for rights. In fact, the majority of feminist and social projects headed by women during the Second Republic were created without the support of the French State. La Voix des Femmes is a principal example in this case.

== History ==
=== Founding the journal ===
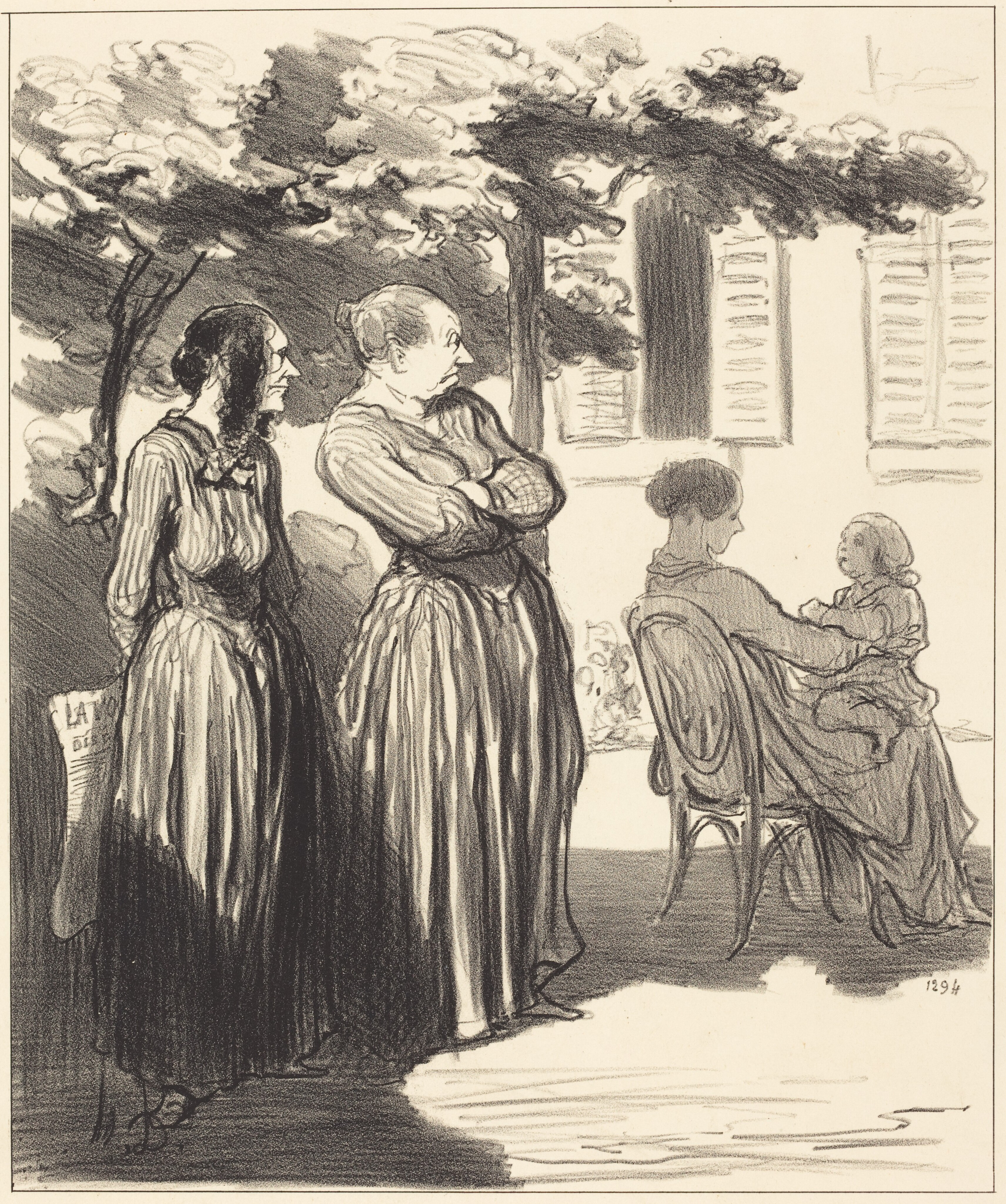
This political cartoon by Honoré Daumier depicts how men viewed the advocacy of La Voix des Femmes. The two women in the foreground, modeled on Eugénie Niboyet and Jeanne Deroin, are holding a copy of the newspaper and scowling at a young mother and her child. Daumier depicts Niboyet and Deroin in an unflattering light as a critique of their political views.

Significant social transformation took place during the year 1848, and in this context, La Voix des Femmes emerged as a beacon for women’s rights. The newspaper’s aim was to promote feminist ideas, and its writers collaborated with women all over the world, such as the English anti-slavery proponent Anne Knight. This relationship represented the larger theme of international correspondences between feminists in the United States, France, Great Britain, and the Germanies. Eugénie Niboyet, who presided over La Voix des Femmes in its beginning stages, argued that people could no longer sideline women’s calls for suffrage and education in the midst of creating the Second Republic. The first edition, published in mid-March, included a discussion on women’s education, a message to the organization of work, letters from the people, critique on prison work, announcements, stories of women, and rights for laundresses, who were notoriously overworked.

March was a pivotal month as the new freedom of the press caused many other newspapers to be promoted around this time as well, yet most of these newspapers were unable to continue past the first or second issues. La Voix des Femmes, however, obtained high rates of readership and significant praises as readers called for its publication daily. Its success was so great that it even surpassed the original writers’ aspirations. La Voix’s accomplishments were very significant to Niboyet and early editors, as it encouraged them to print additional issues of the newspaper and expand their advocacy to additional feminist issues. The editors actively resisted male dominance through the establishment and continued publication of La Voix des Femmes. Specifically, they formed La Voix des Femmes to combat the Provisional Government and its press, which would not circulate women’s writings. They also continued publishing in order to counteract omnipresent male influence by providing women’s voices in the public sphere, and further, to advance female power.

In founding La Voix des Femmes, the three main editors tried to uplift the voices and other disadvantaged groups in French society through the paper and the organization, which went by the same name. The articles published in the paper were revolutionary, and challenged the notion that women were only meant to serve within the home. Furthermore, these women offered up personal spaces to advance their cause and promote women’s rights. Exemplifying this notion, Niboyet’s home became the primary headquarters for the editorial association. Members used it for debates, proposals, and discussions about workshops. This editorial association was known as Association Fraternelle des Femmes, or the Women's Fraternal Association, before they officially chose the appellation of the Club des Femmes. La Voix des Femmes, therefore, was no longer solely a newspaper, but soon grew to encompass a society and an entire organization.

=== Promoting the journal ===
To promote the newspaper, people sold La Voix des Femmes subscriptions on the streets. However, these female hawkers often faced abuse due to their gender and the journal's messages, so it became difficult to promote their cause. Readers assisted with the newspaper’s success, as their support fueled its financial growth. For example, if ten readers agreed to a group subscription, they would also receive a free magazine of La Voix des Femmes. Society membership cost up to three francs, with the lowest as fifty centimes, which brought additional income to help provide for printing and financing the workshops. As providing for unemployed women was a primary goal, Niboyet and others worked to create a collection that would aid working class people. They utilized meetings as a place to raise funds for their “sisters,” and subsequently gave the collected money to working class women for food and other necessities.

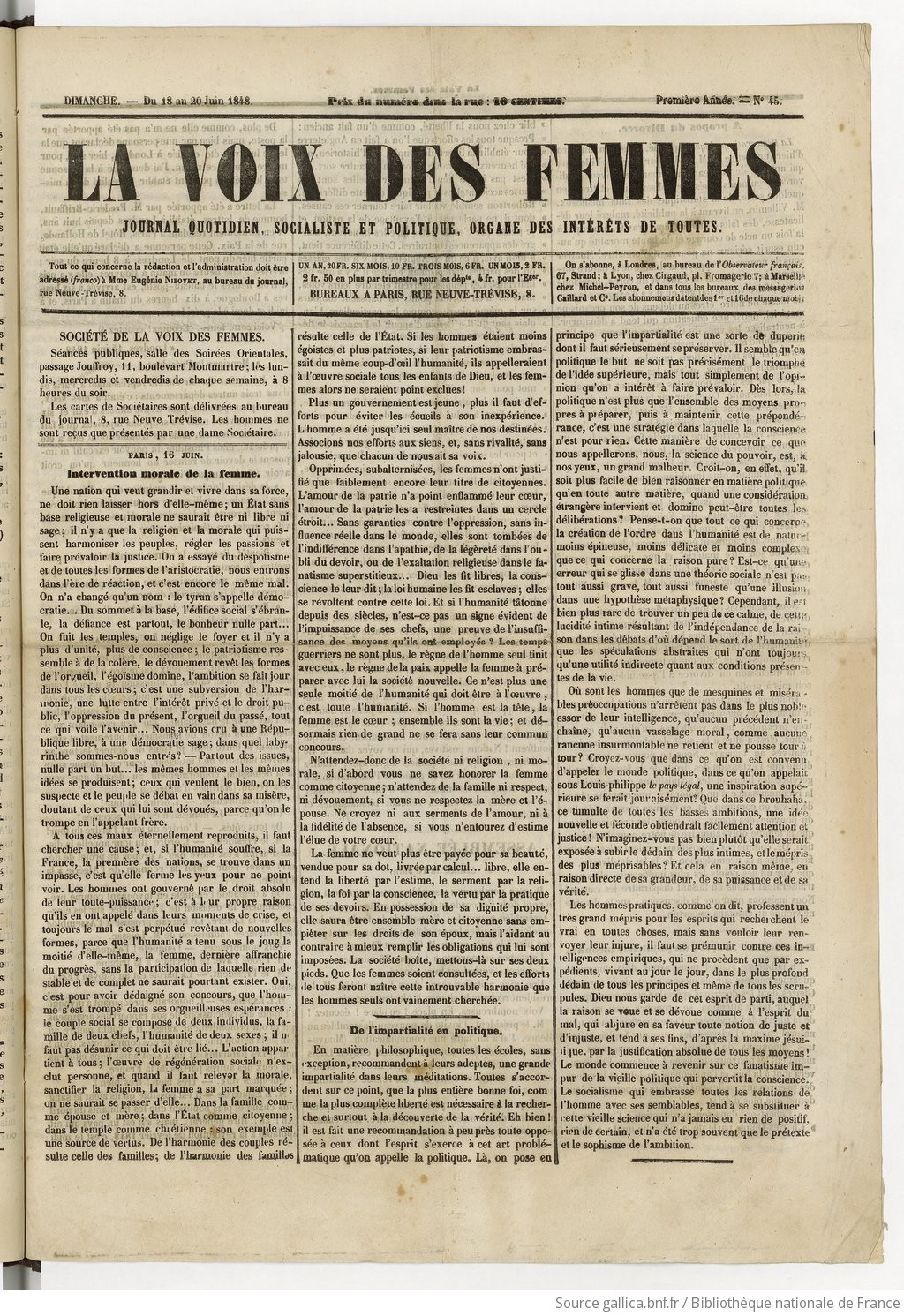
This is the last recorded publication of La Voix des Femmes dated from June 18th, 1848 from the archives of Bibliothèque nationale de France (the National Library of France).

=== Final issue ===
After receiving great success from March to summer, La Voix des Femmes printed its last publication between June 15 and 20, 1848. The closure of the paper and its organization came in the wake of the June Days uprising, during which the French government silenced many socialist political clubs. La Voix des Femmes' writers also had their reputations attacked by government repression and anti-feminist journals. The last issue of La Voix des Femmes continued to discuss matters of divorce and disproved the Republic of 1848, declaring it to be archaic and mistreating of working people. Niboyet, participants in the society, writers, and readers of the publication used the political tensions of 1848 and the aftermath of the French Revolution to their benefit, demanding equal political rights, protection, reforms for laws through divorce, access to education, and protection of the poor.

== Significant coverage and contributors ==
=== Women's suffrage ===
As La Voix des Femmes was established in the wake of the February Revolution and universal male suffrage, much of their coverage advocated for granting women the same rights. In the first issues of the paper, principal editor Eugénie Niboyet criticized the hypocrisy of France’s so-called “universal right to vote”:

“We cannot conceive of the idea of privilege being associated with the idea of democracy, yet meanwhile, when the least intelligent citoyen [male citizen] has the right to vote, the most intelligent citoyenne [female citizen] is still deprived of this right.”

However, following the April elections for the Constituent Assembly, the paper soon qualified their demands for universal female suffrage as they specified only single women should be granted the right to vote. Despite the fact that this concession was meant to soothe conservative sensibilities, La Voix des Femmes continued to receive resistance from the general public, ultimately resulting in the shuttering of their workshops and in-person meetings.

=== Labor rights ===
Stemming from their Saint-Simonian roots, women’s labor rights were a common focus of the paper. In early issues, writers spoke out against the exclusion of predominantly female professions, like garment workers, from government acknowledgment. For instance, La Voix des Femmes supported Eugénie Foa's efforts to organize a national workshop that provided work for these women. The paper also spoke out in defense of one of its main contributors, Désirée Gay, after she advocated for the representation of seamstresses in the Luxembourg Committee.

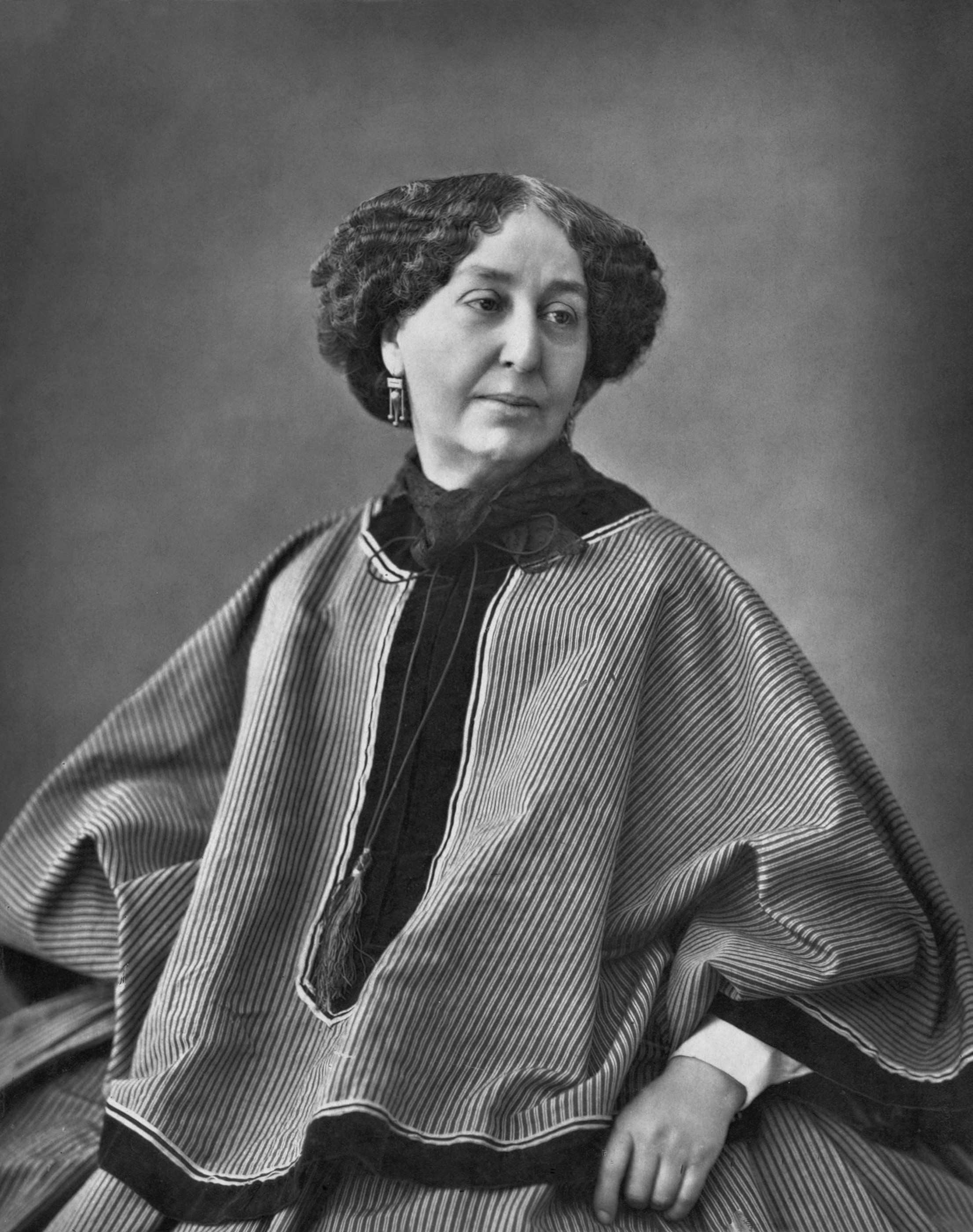
George Sand, a prominent French novelist, who had a public dispute with La Voix des Femmes.

=== George Sand dispute ===
The newspaper is also known for its public dispute with writer George Sand, a prominent feminist and activist during the revolution. Niboyet, in La Voix des Femmes, suggested Sand for nomination to the National Assembly in April 1848 as Sand was one of the most prominent feminists of the time. Niboyet believed in the right to vote for women and their ability to hold office. Sand wrote to republican newspapers to announce her disapproval of this nomination. This was a major break among the feminists of the 1848 Revolution. La Voix des Femmes was supportive of political equality, whereas Sand was more concerned with the equality of women in the private sphere, denouncing her nomination through a public letter. Additionally, Sand tacitly addressed this dispute in her 1848 novel La Petite Fadette, which examines social and gendered hierarchy.

=== Other contributors ===
Many other women contributed to the daily writings of La Voix des Femmes. Though these women came from different backgrounds, they generally had been involved in previous organizational and political efforts, especially Saint-Simonianism. Often, these women wrote under a pseudonym with multiple women using one name, allowing for non-professional women to contribute without fear of public backlash. Generally, these women were known as Vesuviennes (the women of Vesuvius) for their passion and commitment to revolutionary change. Some notable and named contributors include Louise Crouzat, Hortense Wild, Anne Knight, Bettina von Arnim, Marie-Noémi Constant, Adèle Esquiros, Widow Mourey, Eugénie Foa, P.G. Ouvrière, and Gabrielle Soumet.

== Legacy ==
Although the February Revolution of 1848 did not grant women the right to vote, both the revolution and La Voix des Femmes went on to inspire women’s movements. After the final publication of La Voix des Femmes in June 1848, Jeanne Deroin established a new newspaper to advocate for working class people and women, known as La Politique des femmes. This journal, which ended in August 1848 due to censorship, emulated La Voix des Femmes' techniques to call for the enfranchisement of women.

The revolutionary movements are thought to have inspired the Seneca Falls Convention of the same year. Women heard enough about the protests and demands of French women that they too followed their lead and demanded similar rights to those espoused by the newspaper. The revolutions became a point of contention within the United States, similar to the French Revolution of 1789. The socialist nature of this newspaper, along with being revolutionary, proved to be influential on feminists of the latter part of the 19th century, including Charlotte Gilman, Frances Willard, and Elizabeth Cady Stanton.
