= Pierre Mouchon =

Genevan pastor and author (1733-1797)

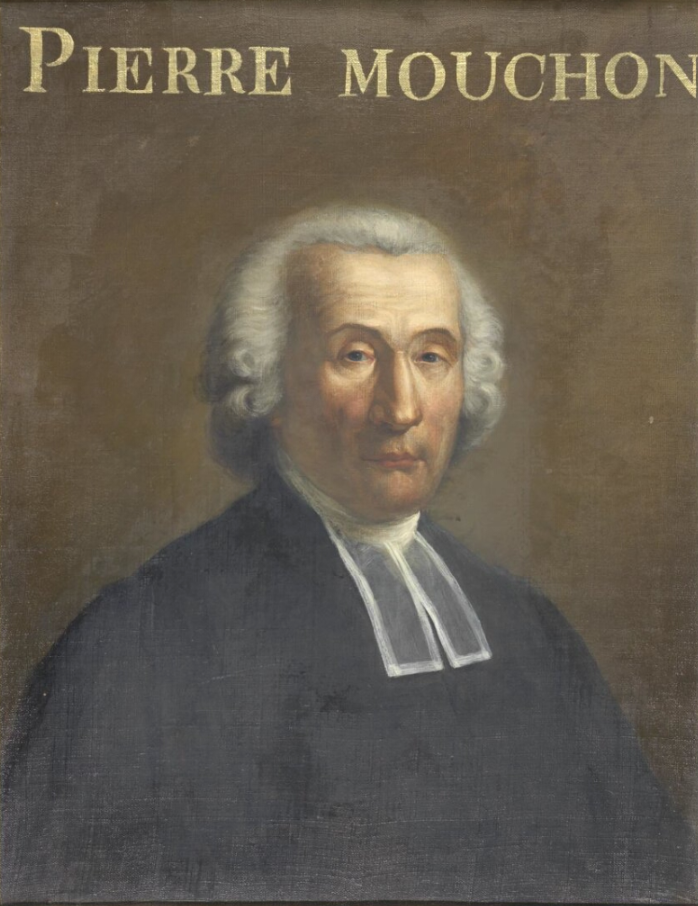
Portrait by François Ferrière, c. 1780

Pierre Mouchon (French pronunciation: [pjɛʁ muʃɔ̃]; 30 July 1733 – 20 August 1797) was an 18th-century Genevan pastor, best remembered for being the author of the Table analytique et raisonnée... (index) of the Encyclopédie by Diderot and D'Alembert.

== Biography ==
Mouchon was born on 30 July 1733 in Geneva, Republic of Geneva, the son of Etienne Mouchon, a watchmaker, and Jacquemine De Thou. He studied theology in Geneva from 1754 to 1758. Mouchon served as regent (1759–1766) and principal (1791–1797) of the Collège de Genève, and was secretary of the Company of Pastors from 1788 to 1789. He was the pastor of the French Church of Basel from 1766 until his return to Geneva in 1778, where he ministered until his death. Keen on mathematics and astronomy, known to Jean-Jacques Rousseau, Mouchon undertook from 1774 to 1775, the development of what would become the Table analytique et raisonnée des matières contenues dans les XXXIII volumes in-folio du Dictionnaire des sciences, des arts et des métiers published in two volumes in 1780, in Paris by Charles-Joseph Panckoucke and in Amsterdam, by Marc-Michel Rey, the two co publishers of the Supplément à l'Encyclopédie.

Nicknamed "Mouchon table", it consists of an analytical and summary index of the entire corpus of the Encyclopédie, supplements included, and contains thematic knowledge tree views. The warning also points out l'on peut regarder cette Table comme un Abrégé du fameux Dictionnaire [et] peut même le remplacer en bien des occasions ("this Table may be looked at as an Abstract of the famous Dictionary [and] may even replace it on many occasions". What this warning fails to say is that Mouchon did ignore the anti-Christian passages (related to materialism) that dot here and there the Dictionary...

According to Jean Senebier, Mouchon received for this work, which probably required him paring all 33 volumes, the lump sum of 4,800 livres; the manuscript was then typeset in particular by the famous De Tournes family.

Eugénie Niboyet (1796–1883), a French author, journalist and early feminist, was a granddaughter of Pierre Mouchon.

== See also ==
- Figurative system of human knowledge
