= Gabrielle Soumet =

French dramatist, poet, and feminist writer

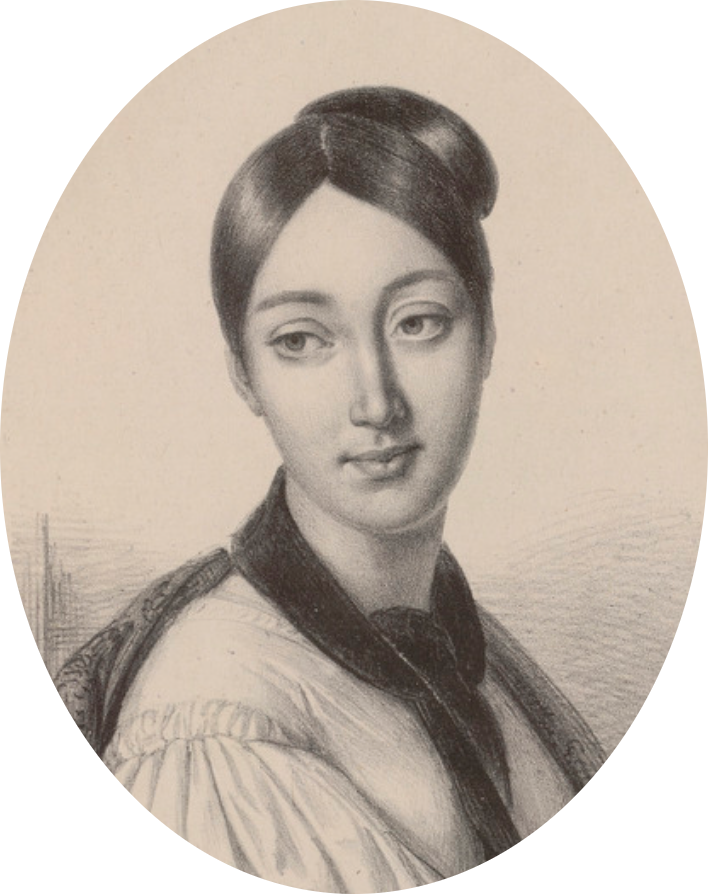
Gabrielle Soumet in 1836

Gabrielle Soumet (after marriage, Gabrielle d'Altenheim; pen name, G.S.; March 17, 1814 – May 16, 1886) was a French dramatist, poet, and feminist writer.

== Biography ==
Gabrielle Soumet was born on March 17, 1814, in Paris. Her father was Alexandre Soumet, a poet and playwright well known in the 19th century. She showed a great inclination for poetry from an early age.

In 1834, she married Beuvain d'Altenheim, who was born in Altenheim.

== Career ==
In 1838, she wrote Les nouvelles succursales (Nouvelles subsidiaries), which she had almost all written as a young girl, and which she signed Gabrielle d'Altenheim, the name by which she is exclusively known.

On April 24, 1841, she had the Gladiateur : tragédie en 5 actes (Gladiator : tragedy in 5 acts) performed at the Comédie-Française; it was written by her in collaboration with her father. It was performed the same evening as Le Chêne du Roi (The King's Oak), a historical comedy in one act by the latter. These two plays had the same critical success and were printed under the title: Une soirée au théâtre français (An evening at the French theater). In 1844, she wrote Jane Grey: tragédie en cinq actes et en vers (Jane Grey, a tragedy in five acts and in verse) with her father which was presented at the Odéon-Théâtre de l'Europe on March 5, 1844. Subsequently, she mainly wrote collections of poems. After 1844, Soumet wrote nothing more for the theatre.

She published a certain number of works among which are included: "Berthe Bertha", poem, 1843; Récits de l'histoire d'Angleterre depuis Jules-César jusqu'à nos jours première (Stories of the history of England from Julius Caesar to the present day), first edition 1856, 4th, 1879; Récits de l'histoire de Rome payenne (Stories of the history of pagan Rome), 1856; les Marguerites de France (The Marguerites of France), 1858; les Deux frères (The Two Brothers), 1858; les Quatre siècles littéraires (The Four Literary Centuries), 1859, 4th ed. 1869; and Anecdotes édifiantes (Edifying Anecdotes), 1875. She kept in her portfolio, in addition to several pieces by her father and herself, a translation into verse of Nuits d'Young (Young's Nights), and a study on the Jacquerie.

Committed to the feminist newspaper La voix des femmes, she signed with the initials "G.S.", which drew criticism for wanting to usurp George Sand's fame. She was a member of the Women's Club created by Eugénie Niboyet.

== Selected works ==
- Les Filiales, collection of poems, 1836
- Le Gladiateur, tragedy, with Alexandre Soumet, 1841
- Le Clône du roi, with Alexandre Soumet, 1841
- Jane Grey, tragedy, with Alexandre Soumet, 1844
- Berthe Bertha, poem, 1843
- Le siècle de Lamartine, 1848
- Récits de l'Histoire d'Angleterre, 1856
- Les Marguerite de France
- La Croix et la Lyre, 1858
- Les Quatre Siècles littéraires, 1859
- Récits de l'Histoire d'Espagne, 1865
- Dieu pardonne, 1871
- Journal des jeunes personnes
