= Amand Bazard =

French socialist

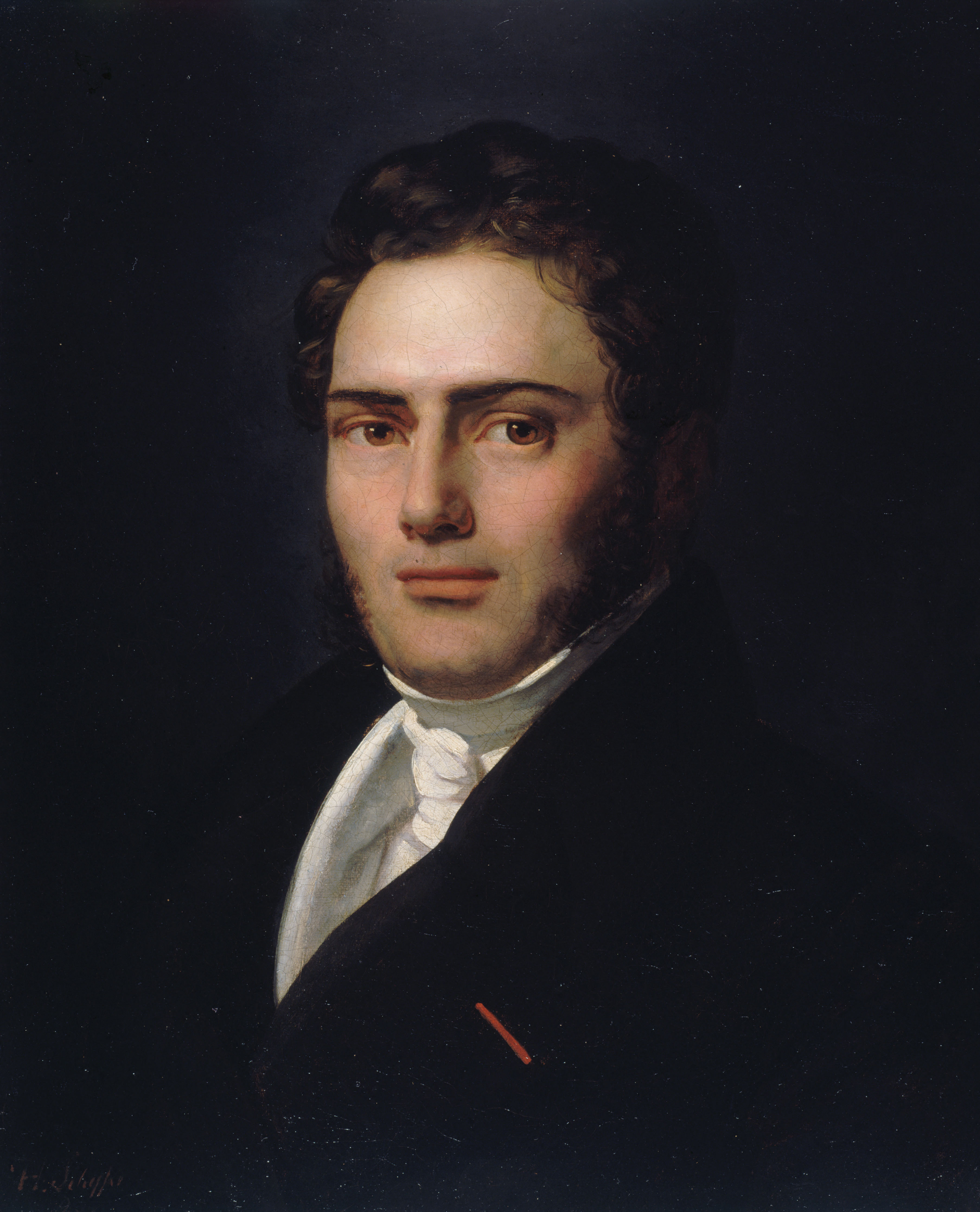
- Born: 18 September 1791; Paris
- Died: 29 July 1832 (aged 40); Courtry
- Awards: Legion of Honour

Saint-Amand Bazard (18 September 1791 – 29 July 1832) was a French socialist, the founder of a secret society in France corresponding to the Carbonari of Italy.

== Biography ==
He was born in Paris. He took part in the defence of Paris in 1815, and afterwards occupied a subordinate situation in the prefecture of the Seine département. At 25 years of age, he was appointed a knight of the Legion of Honor. About 1820, he united some of his patriotic friends into a society called Amis de la vérité (literally "Friends of the truth"). From this, a complete system of Carbonarism developed, whose peculiar principles were introduced from Italy by two of Bazard's friends. Bazard himself was at the head of the central body, and, while taking a general lead, contributed extensively to the Carbonarist journal, L'Aristarque. An unsuccessful outbreak at Belfort ruined the society, and the leaders were compelled to conceal themselves. Bazard, after remaining for some time in obscurity in Paris, came to the conclusion that the ends of those who wished well to the people would be most easily attained, not through political agitation, but by effecting a radical change in their social condition.

This train of thinking naturally drew him towards the socialist philosophers of the school of Saint-Simon, whom he joined, he contributed to their journal, Le Producteur; and in 1828 began to give public lectures on the principles of the school. His opposition to the emancipation of women brought about a quarrel with Enfantin in 1831, and Bazard found himself almost deserted by the members of the society. He attacked Enfantin violently, and, in a heated argument among them, he was struck down by apoplexy. After lingering for a few months, he died in Courtry.
