= Élisa Lemonnier =

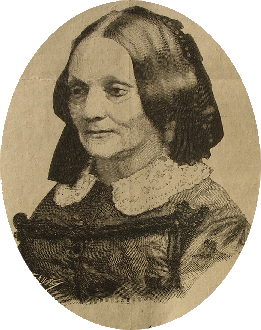
- Élisa Lemonnier
- Born: Marie-Juliette Élisa Grimailh; 24 March 1805; Sorèze, France
- Died: 5 June 1865 (aged 60); Paris, France
- Occupation: Educationalist
- Known for: Founder of women's professional education

Élisa Lemonnier (24 March 1805 – 5 June 1865) was a French educationist considered the founder of vocational education for women in France.

== Early years ==
Marie-Juliette Élisa Grimailh, known as Élisa by her family, was born in Sorèze, Tarn on 24 March 1805, the third of five children. Her father was Jean Grimailh, from an old Sorèze family, and her mother was Étiennette-Rosalie Aldebert, descended from the noble family of Barrau de Muratel through her mother. Her maternal grand-uncle was David Maurice Champouliès de Barrau de Muratel, who commanded the first infantry line at the Battle of Valmy (20 September 1792). Both of her parents were Protestants. Her father died when she was young, and she was raised by her mother and grandmother, and by her cousin Mme Saint-Cyr de Barrau de Muratel. Élisa Grimailh was a beauty, intelligent, imaginative and generous.

Élisa Grimailh participated in the discussion of ideas generated by the directors of the College of Sorèze, she met Charles Lemonnier, a young professor of philosophy, whom she married on 22 April 1831. The couple became followers of the school of Saint-Simon, and devoted everything they owned to the propagation of the ideas of this school, but it soon broke up. Charles Lemonnier joined the Bar of Bordeaux. While remaining interested in the ideas that had attracted her to Saint-Simonianism, Élisa Lemonnier found herself confined to her small household and duties as a mother.

== Paris ==
After ten years in Bordeaux, Charles Lemonnier was named General Council of the French Northern Railway (Compagnie des chemins de fer du Nord) in Paris. Soon afterwards, the Revolutions of 1848 erupted. Élisa Lemonnier was moved by the misery she witnessed and, with the help of some friends organized a work room which she ran for over two months. The workers' lack of skills gave her the idea of founding vocational education for women.

After various attempts, Élisa Lemonnier managed to create the Société de protection maternelle ("League of maternal protection"), which on 9 May 1862 became the Société pour l'enseignement professionnel des femmes ("Society for Vocational Education of Women"). A building was rented in Élisa Lemonnier's name at 9, rue de la Perle, and on 1 October 1862, the first vocational school for girls was opened. The rapid success of this first school led to the opening of a second at 72 rue Rochechouart. However, exhausted by her work, Élisa Lemonnier died at 60 on 5 June 1865 after an illness lasting a few days.

== Legacy ==
Caroline de Barrau became interested in educational issues and won the respect of Élisa Lemonnier while raising her own children. She gathered children of both sexes around her daughter and two sons, and chose teachers to work under her direction. She went on to pioneer women's preparation for university entrance, until then closed to women, and succeeded in having her daughter and other young women "intellectually prepared for work of university grade" admitted to study medicine at the University of Paris.

The new form of education was so suitable to the needs of contemporary society that the example was soon followed abroad, first in Switzerland, Belgium and Italy. Several of the large French provincial cities opened vocational schools for girls. The Élisa Lemonnier schools won a gold medal at the Universal Exposition of 1878. On 11 December 1880 a law on the organization of this new type of school was issued. The municipality of Paris opened its first vocational school for girls along the lines set down by Élisa Lemonnier in 1882. The two schools in Paris were assigned to the City of Paris on 1 October 1906, and one still bears the name of Élisa Lemonnier. The École Duperré now specializes in commercial art. A street in Paris is named after Élisa Lemonnier.

== Sources ==
- DuBois, Ellen Carol (1999-10-01). Harriot Stanton Blatch and the Winning of Woman Suffrage. Yale University Press. ISBN 978-0-300-08068-1.
- Kergomard, Pauline (2014). "Barrau (Madame de)" (in French). Institute Français de l'éducation.
- Lemonnier, Charles (1874). Élisa Lemonnier, fondatrice de la Société pour l'enseignement professionnel des femmes (in French). Cusset et Ce. p. 7.
- Toussaint, Julie (1911). Ferdinand Buisson (ed.). Lemonnier (madame Elisa). Nouveau Dictionnaire de pédagogie... (in French). Paris: Librairie Hachette.
