= Pauline Roland =

French feminist activist (1805–1852)

- Born: Marie Désirée Pauline Roland; 6 June 1805; Falaise
- Died: 15 December 1852 (aged 47); 2nd arrondissement of Lyon
- Known for: Feminism and socialism

Pauline Roland (1805, Falaise, Calvados – 15 December 1852) was a French feminist and socialist.

Upon her mother's insistence, Roland received a good education and was introduced to the ideas of Claude Henri de Rouvroy, Comte de Saint-Simon, the founder of French socialism, by one of her teachers. She became an enthusiastic supporter of his philosophy. Following her arrival in Paris in 1832, Roland began writing for early feminist papers and compiled a series of remarkable histories of France (1845), England (1838), and England, Scotland and Ireland (1845).

Roland was a close associate of Pierre Leroux and George Sand and she joined Leroux's community at Boussac (Indre) in 1847, where she worked in the school and wrote for l'Eclaireur de l'Indre. Roland lived for twelve years until 1845 in a "free union" with Jean Aicard, insisting that their two children, and a son whose father was Adolphe Guérolt, bear her name and be brought up by her. On Flora Tristan's death in 1844, she also undertook the care of her daughter Aline (later to be the mother of Paul Gauguin).

On Roland's return to Paris in December, she became active in feminist and socialist agitation and publications (the Voix des Femmes), notably with Jeanne Deroin and Desirée Gay. With Deroin and Gustave Lefrançais she established the Association of Socialist Teachers stressing the importance of equality of the sexes in an education program spanning the first eighteen years of life and of women staying in the work force. Roland then played a key role in convening the Union of Workers Associations.

In October 1849 delegates of over 100 trades elected Roland to the central committee. This attempt to resuscitate the cooperative movement in 1848 was suppressed by the government in April 1850, and Roland was one of fifty people arrested the following month. At her subsequent trial for her socialism, feminism and "debauchery," she was attacked vitriolically and then imprisoned for seven months, until July 1851. Undaunted, Roland was active in the Parisian resistance to the coup d'état of December and subsequently imprisoned in Algeria. She owed her early release to the intercession of Pierre-Jean de Béranger and George Sand however, on the way home to rejoin her children, she became ill owing to the harsh conditions she had endured in prison and died in Lyon on 15 December 1852.
