= David Maurice Champouliès de Barrau de Muratel =

General in the French army

- Born: 14 February 1742
- Died: 5 February 1827 (aged 84)
- Occupation: Soldier

David Maurice Champouliès de Barrau de Muratel (14 February 1742 – 5 February 1827) was a general in the French army during the French Revolution.

== Life ==
The Barrau family became seigneurs of Muratel in 1557, taking the name "Barrau de Muratel". David Maurice Champouliès de Barrau de Muratel was the best known of this family. He was born on 14 February 1742. He joined the army, and was made lieutenant on 30 April 1757, cornet in the Orléans Dragoons on 19 April 1760, captain in the regiment of the King's Dragoons on 12 April 1762, captain-commander in 1777, lieutenant-colonel of the Royal Dragoons on 29 October 1786. He was made a knight of the Order of Saint Louis on 15 September 1781, and was decorated on 30 April 1782.

Muratel was appointed colonel of the Royal Dragoons on 21 October 1791. He distinguished himself at the head of his regiment on 29 July 1792 in the engagement near Landau, and on 3 August 1792 at Arnhem. His nephew David-Maurice-Joseph Mathieu de la Redorte fought under him at Arnhem. On the 10 August 1792 Kellermann therefore asked for his promotion to field marshal (maréchal de camp), which had been granted by the minister of war two days earlier. Muratel commanded the first line of infantry at the Battle of Valmy (20 September 1792).

Muratel was no longer employed after 15 May 1793 and was decommissioned on 5 August 1794. He died on 5 February 1827. He was buried in the garden of the Chateau of Muratel.

== Sources ==
- Broughton, Tony (2014). "French Dragoons and the Colonels Who Led Them 1792-1815". Napoleon Series.
- Carnot, Lazare (1892). Correspondance générale de Carnot: Août 1792-mars 1793. Imprimerie nationale. p. 82.
- Courcelles, Jean-Baptiste-Pierre (1826). Histoire généalogique et héraldique des pairs de France, des grands dignitaires de la couronne, des principales familles nobles du royaume, et des maisons princières de l'Europe... l'auteur. p. 283.
- Cros, Philippe; Mointron, Philippe (1999). Châteaux, manoirs et logis. Ed. Patrimoine & Médias. ISBN 978-2-910137-44-1.
- Lemonnier, Charles (1874). Élisa Lemonnier, fondatrice de la Société pour l'enseignement professionnel des femmes (in French). Cusset et Ce. p. 7.
- Mazas, Alexandre; Anne, Théodore (1860). Histoire de L'ordre royal et militaire de Saint-Louis ... jusqu'en 1830, terminée per T. Anne.
