= Marie-Reine Guindorf =

French writer and activist

Marie-Reine Guindorf (1812–1837) was a French feminist and socialist writer. She was co-editor of the first feminist newspaper, La Femme Libre, written and produced by women.

== Activism ==
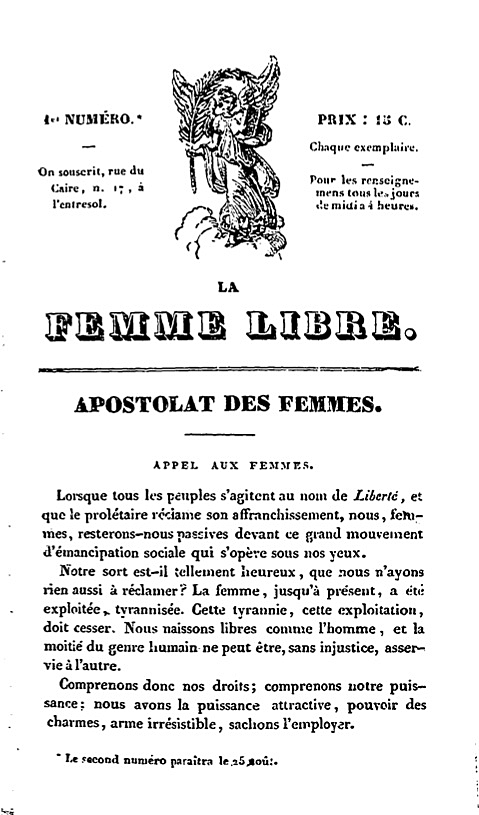
Cover of issue number 1 of the first newspaper produced and written by women for women in the 19th century

Marie-Reine Guindorf was a young laundry worker when she joined Saint-Simonism. She joined the activists around Claire Bazard. In August 1832, together with Désirée Véret, she founded La Femme libre in response to Barthélemy Prosper Enfantin's exclusion of women from decision-making among the Saint-Simonists. With the second issue, the journal was renamed L'Apostolat des femmes.

This publication is not a speculation, but a work of faith in the freedom and community of women, after having deeply felt the slavery and inferiority that weigh on our sex. We raise our voices to call on women to come with us and claim the place we should have in the church, the state and the family. Our goal is to unite. Women, who until now have not had an organization that allowed them to dedicate themselves to something big, could only deal with small individual matters that left them in isolation. [...] We are Saint-Simonians, and that is precisely why we do not have an exclusionary attitude that rejects everything that one does not consider right for oneself.

— Marie-Reine, La Femme libre, no. 1 (Note: like all articles in the magazine, the article is signed with the first name only)

Other women joined them, such as Suzanne Voilquin, who became co-editor from No. 6 onwards. The women's group that supported the publication formed an association called La Femme Nouvelle. Guindorf, who became increasingly involved with Fourierism, eventually left the newspaper. Voilquin took over management of the publication and changed the title to La Tribune des femmes.

== Personal life ==
Marie-Reine married the young Saint-Simonist Flichi after returning from a mission to the Mediterranean led by Émile Barrault. In 1835, she gave birth to a boy who was placed with a wet nurse. The couple were able to live in an apartment thanks to the generosity of Flichi's parents, who have received an unexpected inheritance. At the end of 1836, Suzanne Voilquin lived in the young couple's apartment in the Rue Montmorency in Paris for six weeks, until January 8, 1837.
