= Désirée Gay =

French socialist feminist

Desirée Gay
- Born: Jeanne Desirée Véret; 16 July 1810; Paris, France
- Died: 1891; Brussels, Belgium
- Occupations: Women's rights activist, delegate, publisher, seamstress
- Political party: International Workingmen's Association
- Spouse: Jules Gay

Jeanne Desirée Véret Gay (French: [deziʁe ɡɛ]; born Desirée Véret (French: [deziʁe veʁɛ]; 4 April 1810 – c. 1891) was a French socialist feminist.

== Life and career ==
Born in Paris, she worked as a seamstress before, in 1831, joining the followers of utopian socialist Henri de Saint-Simon. The following year, with Marie Reine Guindorff, she founded the Tribune des femmes, edited by Suzanne Voilquin, in reaction to the exclusion of women from decision making among the Saint-Simonites. She vowed to pursue the "liberty of women" above all other concerns.

In 1833, Gay moved to work in England. While there, she made contact with the supporters of socialist Robert Owen, including Jules Gay and Anna Wheeler. During this period, she acted as an intermediary between the Owenites, the Saint-Simonites and Charles Fourier. She also had a brief affair with Victor Considerant, which had ended by 1837, when she married Gay, thereafter usually being known as Desirée Gay.

In 1840, the Gays tried to found a school in Châtillon-sous-Bagneux which aimed to educate children from birth, but this failed, probably due to lack of capital.

After the February Revolution of 1848, Gay again rose to prominence. She drafted a proposal that the French government set up workshops, nationalized restaurants and laundries to allow women to be financially independent. Gay was unanimously elected as the women's delegate to represent the second district to the French government. National workshops were set up by the Luxembourg Commission, and Gay was appointed as the head of the division of the National Workshop of Cour des Fontaines, but the workshops were only for female textile workers and paid starvation wages. She was discharged from her post, and instead worked with Jeanne Deroin and Eugenie Niboyet in publishing Voix des Femmes. The group was soon forced to close, but Gay worked with Deroin to found the Association Mutuelle des Femmes and Politique des Femmes newspaper. While the two were able to obtain 12,000 francs from the National Assembly to form an association of women seamstresses making ladies' underwear, Gay chose not to take part in establishing the organisation. She withdrew from activism during 1849, and by the following year was working as a dressmaker.

Money from old friends enabled Gay to start a fabric shop in the rue de la Paix, and her work won a prize at the Exposition universelle de Paris of 1855. Her husband worked as a bookseller and printer, but the controversial material he worked with forced the two into exile in Brussels in 1864, becoming active in the International Workingmen's Association, Desirée acting as the President of the Women's Section in 1866. In 1869 they moved to Geneva, then to Turin, before finally returning to Brussels.

Gay lost her sight during 1890, and with her husband deceased, took the opportunity to renew her correspondence with Considerant. This ceased in mid-1891, and this may mark her death; a visit by Considerant to Brussels in November did not lead to a meeting with her, and may have represented his attendance at her funeral.
