= Luxembourg Commission =

1848 French revolutionary body

The Government Commission for Workers (French: Commission du gouvernement pour les travailleurs), best known as the Labour Commission (Commission du travail) or the Luxembourg Commission (Commission du Luxembourg), was a commission formed in France on 28 February 1848, as part of the provisional government which took over after the February Revolution and the proclamation of the Second Republic. It met at the palais du Luxembourg, the former seat of the upper chamber of the legislature in Paris.

The commission, an assembly of workers' delegates headed by Louis Blanc, was charged with the task of surveying social problems and suggesting solutions. It was abolished on 16 May.

== Sources ==
- Hayat, Samuel (2014). Quand la République était révolutionnaire. Citoyenneté et représentation en 1848 (in French). Paris: Seuil. pp. 89–96, 141–155, 233–236. ISBN 978-2-02-113639-5.
