= Jeanne Deroin =

French socialist feminist (1805–1894)

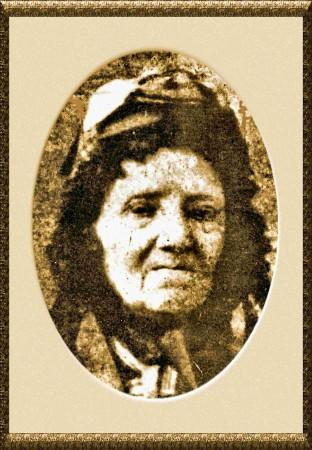
Jeanne Deroin in 1890.

Jeanne Deroin (pseudonym, Jeanne Victoire; 31 December 1805 – 2 April 1894) was a French socialist feminist. She spent the latter half of her life in exile in London, where she continued her organising activities.

== Early life ==
Born in Paris, Deroin became a seamstress. In 1831, she joined the followers of utopian socialist Henri de Saint-Simon. For her required statement of her belief in their principles, she wrote a 44-page essay, in part inspired by Olympe de Gouges' 1791 Declaration of the Rights of Woman and of the Female Citizen, in which Deroin argued against the idea that women were inferior to men, and likened marriage to slavery. Despite this, in 1832, she married Antoine Ulysse Desroches, a fellow Saint-Simonite, but refused to take his surname and insisted on taking a vow of equality in a civil ceremony.

Later in 1832, Deroin was part of a group of working women who, in protest at the Saint-Simonites hierarchical and religious nature left the group, and became supporters of the socialist Charles Fourier. They began publishing La Femme libre, the first newspaper for women in France, for which she wrote under the pseudonym "Jeanne Victoire".

During this period, Deroin qualified as a schoolteacher. From 1834, she focused on this work, and on bringing up her children and those of Flora Tristan.

== 1848 Revolution ==
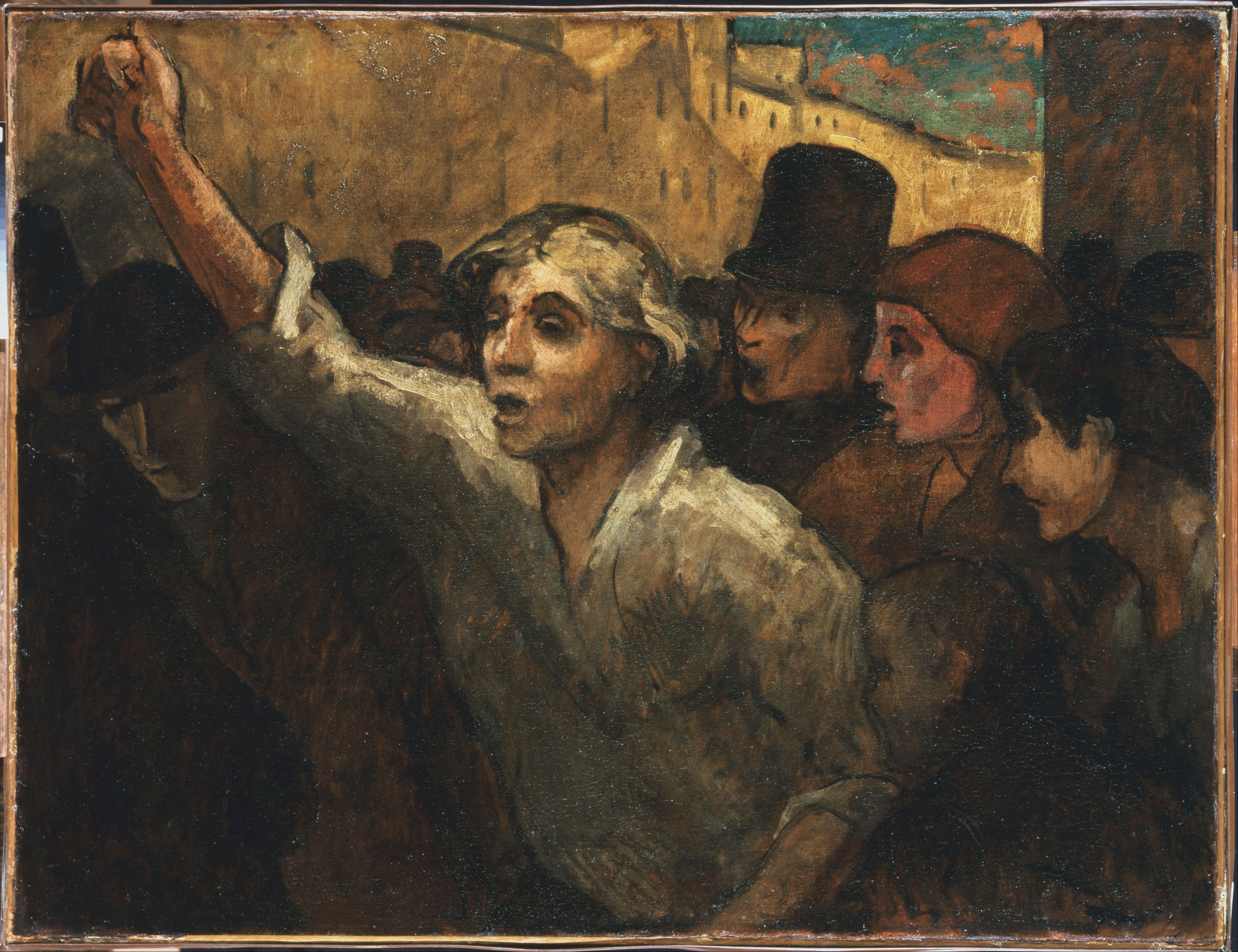
Deroin features as the central character in The Uprising (L'Emeute) by Honoré Daumier.

Deroin was a prominent figure during the Revolutions of 1848, campaigning on the rights of women and against the exploitation of children and harsh treatment of convicts. With other Fourierist women such as Pauline Roland, Eugenie Niboyet and Desirée Gay, she launched a socialist feminist newspaper and club, the Voix des Femmes. She led calls for women's suffrage. The group was soon forced to close, but Deroin worked with Gay to found the Association Mutuelle des Femmes and Politique des Femmes newspaper. The organisation gave free courses to working women. Politique des Femmes soon found itself unable to raise a 5,000 franc security bond required by the government. Deroin replaced it with Opinion des Femmes, but this lasted only one issue.

In January 1849, Deroin relaunched Opinion des Femmes. She continued her campaigns, and in particular argued against the anarchist philosopher Pierre-Joseph Proudhon. Deroin stood in the Department of the Seine at the 1849 French legislative election, becoming the first woman in France to stand in a national election. She stood for the Comité Démocrate Sociale, but received only fifteen votes, in part because she would not have been permitted to take a seat. She then became the Deputy President of the Société Populaire pour le Progression et la Réalisation de la Science Sociale, which campaigned for a peaceful social revolution.

In Opinion des Femmes's last issue, of August 1849, Deroin called for the formation of the Association Fraternelle et Solidaire de Toutes les Associations, seeing it as a chance to transform the loose co-operative movement into a revolutionary general union which could organise work through its affiliated associations, eliminate wages and control the economy.

The National Assembly gave her and Gay 12,000 francs to form an association of women seamstresses making ladies' underwear, and a fraternal association along a watered-down version of her proposal was initially able to link together more than one hundred existing organisations. Deroin was elected to its Central Committee, alongside Roland. However, the Association was gradually repressed by the Government, and in May 1850, its offices were raided, 46 members being arrested.

== Imprisonment and exile ==
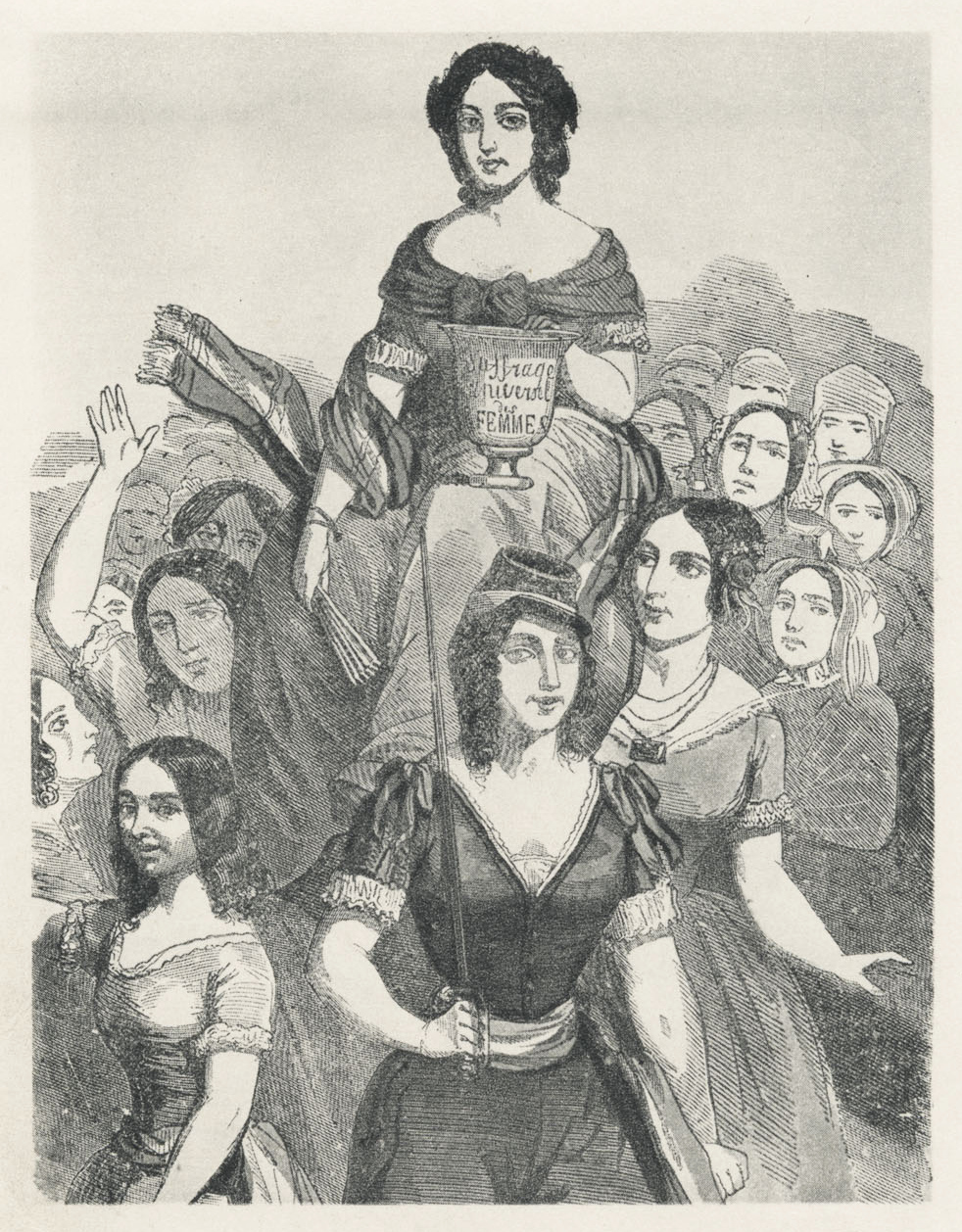
Jeanne Deroin lifted on the shoulders of women of different classes, holding a chalice that reads, “Suffrage Universal des Femmes” (“Universal Women’s Suffrage”)

Deroin was imprisoned until June 1851, using this time to campaign further on women's rights. She wrote to groups including the National Women's Rights Convention in Massachusetts and the Sheffield Female Political Association, giving advice on tactics. On her release, she returned to teaching, but in 1852, fearing re-arrest, she travelled to London with her two youngest children. She lived in Shepherd's Bush, where she worked teaching and embroidering. She also published three women's almanacs and remained active in supporting workers' co-operatives.

In 1862, Deroin founded a boarding school for children of French exiles, aiming to admit even the poorest children, but the project did not prove financially viable. In 1871, she was granted a small pension by the new Government of France. Although she remained in London, she kept up a correspondence with socialist feminists and women's suffrage campaigners in France, such as Léon Richer, Madame Arnaud and Hubertine Auclert.

In the 1880s, Deroin joined the Socialist League, and its founder William Morris delivered the oration at her funeral.
