= Barthélemy-Prosper Enfantin =

French social reformer

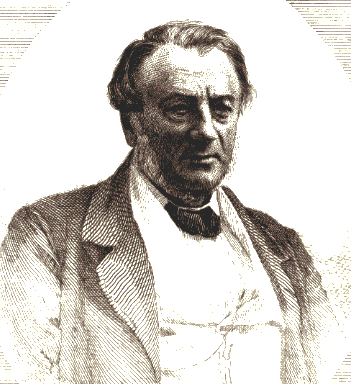
- Born: 8 February 1796; Paris, France
- Died: 1 September 1864 (aged 68); Paris, Second French Empire
- Citizenship: France
- Education: École Polytechnique
- Occupations: Explorer, Engineer, Socio-Economic Movement Founder
- Known for: Suez Canal Proponent, Saint-Simonism Founder

Barthélemy-Prosper Enfantin (8 February 1796 – 1 September 1864) was a French social reformer, one of the founders of Saint-Simonianism. He was also a proponent of a Suez Canal. Sometimes called Père Enfantin, he was an economist and political theorist. He became director of the new Lyon Railroad Company and continued his work in the railroad industry while still publishing his writings until his death in Paris.

== Early life ==
Enfantin was born in Paris, the son of a banker of Dauphiné. After receiving his early education at a lyceum, he was sent in 1813 to the École polytechnique. In March 1814 he was one of the band of students who, on the heights of Montmartre and Saint-Chaumont, attempted resistance to the armies of the Sixth Coalition which had engaged in the invasion of Paris. In consequence of this outbreak of patriotic enthusiasm, the school was soon after closed by Louis XVIII, and the young student was compelled to seek another career.

Initially, he began working for a country wine merchant, travelling to Germany, Russia and the United Kingdom of the Netherlands. In 1821 he entered a banking-house newly established at Saint Petersburg, but returned two years later to Paris, where he was appointed cashier to the Caisse Hypothécaire. At the same time, he became a member of the secret society of the Carbonari.

In 1825 a new turn was given to his thoughts and his life by the friendship which he formed with Olinde Rodriguez, who introduced him to the Comte de Saint-Simon. He affiliated to Saint-Simon's version of utopian socialism, and, by 1829, he had become one of the acknowledged heads of the movement.

== Preaching and politics ==
After the July Revolution of 1830 Enfantin resigned his office of cashier, and devoted all his energy to the cause. Besides contributing to Le Globe, he made appeals to the people by systematic preaching, and organized centres of action in some of the main cities of France.

The headquarters in Paris were moved from the modest rooms in the Rue Taranne to the large halls near the Boulevard des Italiens. Enfantin and Amand Bazard were proclaimed Pères Suprêmes ("Supreme Fathers") – a union which was, however, only nominal, as a divergence was already manifest. Bazard, who concentrated on organizing the group, had devoted himself to political reform, while Enfantin, who favoured teaching and preaching, dedicated his time to social and moral change. The antagonism was widened by Enfantin's announcement of his theory of the relation of man and woman, which would substitute for the "tyranny of marriage" a system of "free love".

Bazard and his disciples broke with Enfantin's group. The latter became sole "father", leading a chiefly religiously-oriented movement, joined by new converts (according to Enfantin's estimate, the total number of followers would have reached 40,000). He wore on his breast a badge with his title of Père, was referred to by his preachers as "the living law", declared himself to be the chosen of God, and sent out emissaries in a quest of a woman predestined to be the "female Messiah," and the mother of a new Saviour (the latter quest was very costly and altogether fruitless).

== Success and repression ==
Meanwhile, the new religion gathered believers in all parts of Europe. His extravagances and success at length brought him to the attention of authorities, who argued that he was endangering public morality - Enfantin had announced that the gulf between the sexes was too wide and this social inequality would impede rapid growth of society. Enfantin called for the abolition of prostitution and for the ability for women to divorce and obtain legal rights. This was considered radical for the time. In May 1832 the halls of the new sect were closed by the government, and the Père, with some of his followers, appeared before the tribunals. He then retired to his estate at Menilmontant, near Paris, where with forty disciples, all of them men, he continued to carry out his socialist views. In August of the same year he was again arrested, and on his appearance in court he desired his defence to be undertaken by two women who were with him, alleging that the matter was of special concern to women; the request was promptly refused. The trial occupied two days and resulted in a verdict of guilty, and a sentence of imprisonment for a year with a small fine.

This prosecution discredited the new society. Enfantin was released in a few months.

== Turkey and Egypt ==
Then, accompanied by twenty of his followers, many of whom were also engineers from the Ecole Polytechnique, including Charles Joseph Lambert, also known as Lambert-Bey, and some women, he went first to Istanbul. Enfantin had declared 1833 the Year of the Mother, and upon arrival in Istanbul the group began to strongly preach their views about gender relations and New Christianity. The Ottoman Empire told them to leave to avoid prison.

Enfantin and his group then arrived in Egypt, where he planned to penetrate the feminine Orient with the masculine Occident in a consummation of progression - build a canal connecting the Mediterranean Sea with the Red Sea. In Egypt at that time, Muhammad Ali, the Egyptian Viceroy, was at odds with the Ottoman Sultan in Constantinople, and also practiced public-private contracts known as concessions with mostly European companies to build cheap infrastructure. Ali did not agree to a project linking the two seas because he did not want to cut out the duties he collected from overland trade in Egypt, but did allow Enfantin's group to work on the Delta Barrage - a type of dam - north of Cairo - with unpaid laborers - that would act to limit Nile flooding and create predictable crop yields. During his time in Egypt, Enfantine also established technical schools based on the Ecole Polytechnique model with Ali's blessing. Also in Egypt he encountered and influenced Ferdinand de Lesseps. Enfantine returned to France in 1836, lacking the patience to finish the Nile barrage project that was encountering delays.

== Return to France ==
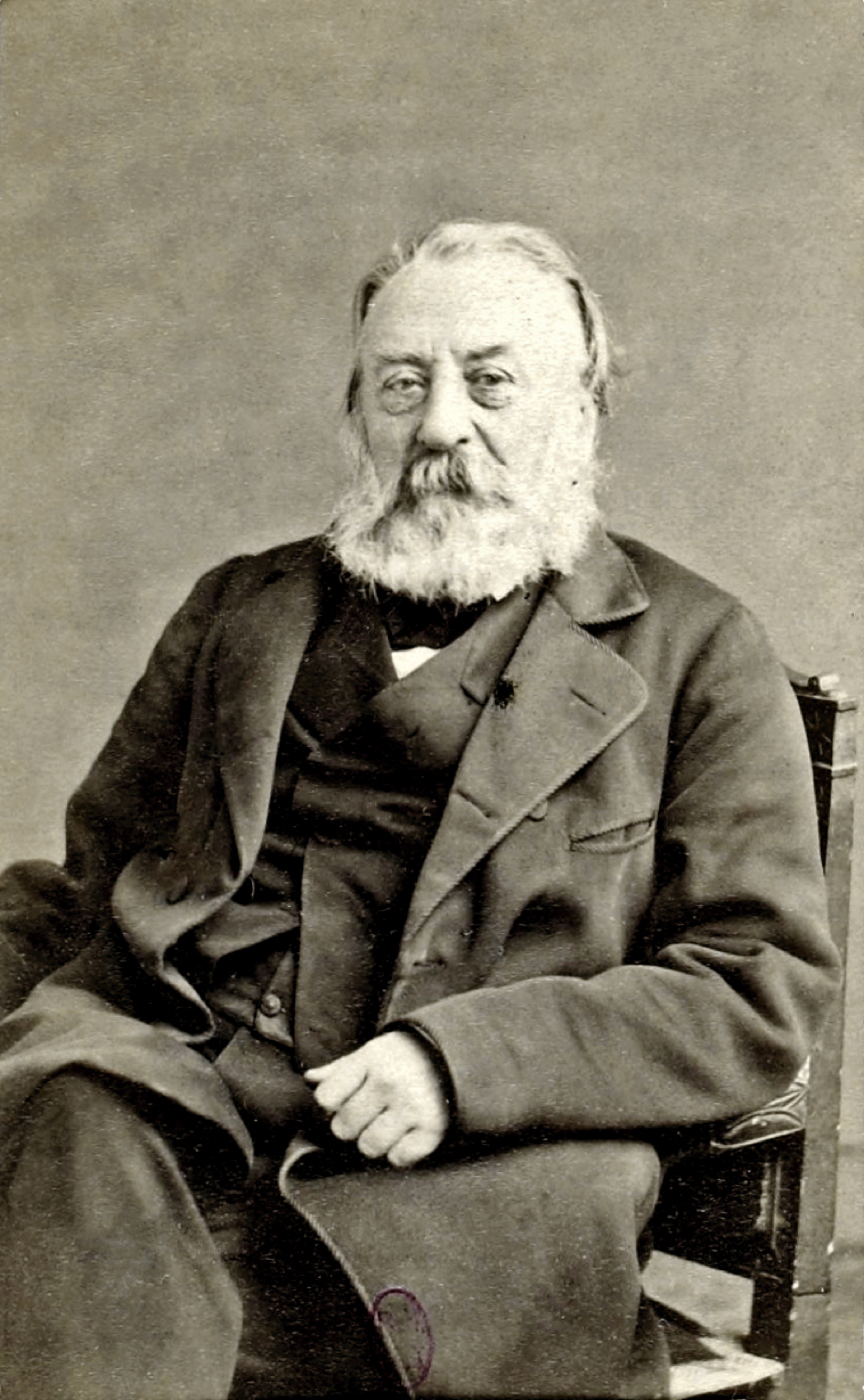

On his return to France, he occupied minor offices. He became first a postmaster near Lyon, and in 1841 was appointed, through the influence of some of his friends who had risen to posts of power, member of a scientific commission on Algeria, which led him to engage in researches concerning North Africa and colonization in general.

In 1845 he was appointed a director of the Paris & Lyons railway. Three years later he established, in conjunction with Duveyrier, a daily journal, entitled Le Credit, which was discontinued in 1850. He was afterwards attached to the administration of the railway from Lyons to the Mediterranean.

== Société d'Études du Canal de Suez ==
Father Enfantin held fast by his ideal to the end, but he had renounced the hope of giving it a local habitation and a name in the degenerate obstinate world. His personal influence over those who associated with him was immense. "He was a man of a noble presence, with finely formed and expressive features. He was gentle and insinuating in manner, and possessed a calm, graceful and winning delivery" (Gent. M . Jan. 1865). His evident sincerity, his genuine enthusiasm, gave him his marvellous ascendancy. The Société d'Études du Canal de Suez was established by Enfantin in 1846 to continue study of the Suez Canal. Its members included Arlès-Dufour, Jules, Lon and Paulin Talabot, the British Robert Stephenson and Edward Starbuck, the Austrian Alois Negrelli, inspector of the Emperor Ferdinand Northern Railway, and Feronce and Sellier of Leipzig as representatives of the German interest.

The Société sent surveying teams to Egypt, developed engineering plans, determined that the elevation difference between the Red Sea and the Mediterranean Sea was negligible, but Muhammad Ali was still reticent to the idea of a canal. Upon his death in 1848, the activities of the Société were minimized until his successor was assassinated in 1854 and Ferdinand de Lesseps took up the initiative to build a canal. Lessups had corresponded at least once with the Société in the intervening years and had known the new Egyptian viceroy, Sa'id, when he was a young man. Enfantin was listed by Lessups as a founder of the Suez Canal Company.

Not a few of his disciples ranked afterwards amongst the most distinguished men of France. Enfantin died suddenly in Paris on September 1, 1864.

== Literary works ==
Amongst his works are: Doctrine de Saint-Simon (written in conjunction with several of his followers), published in 1830, and several times republished; Economie politique et politique Saint-Simonienne (1831); Correspondance politique (1835–1840); Corresp. philos. et religieuse (1843–1845); and La Vie eternelle passee, presente, future (1861). A large number of articles by his hand appeared in Le Producteur, L'Organisateur, Le Globe, and other periodicals. He also wrote in 1832 Le Livre nouveau, intended as a substitute for the Christian Scriptures, but it was not published.

== See also ==
- Saint-Simonianism
