= Crédit Lyonnais =

Former French bank

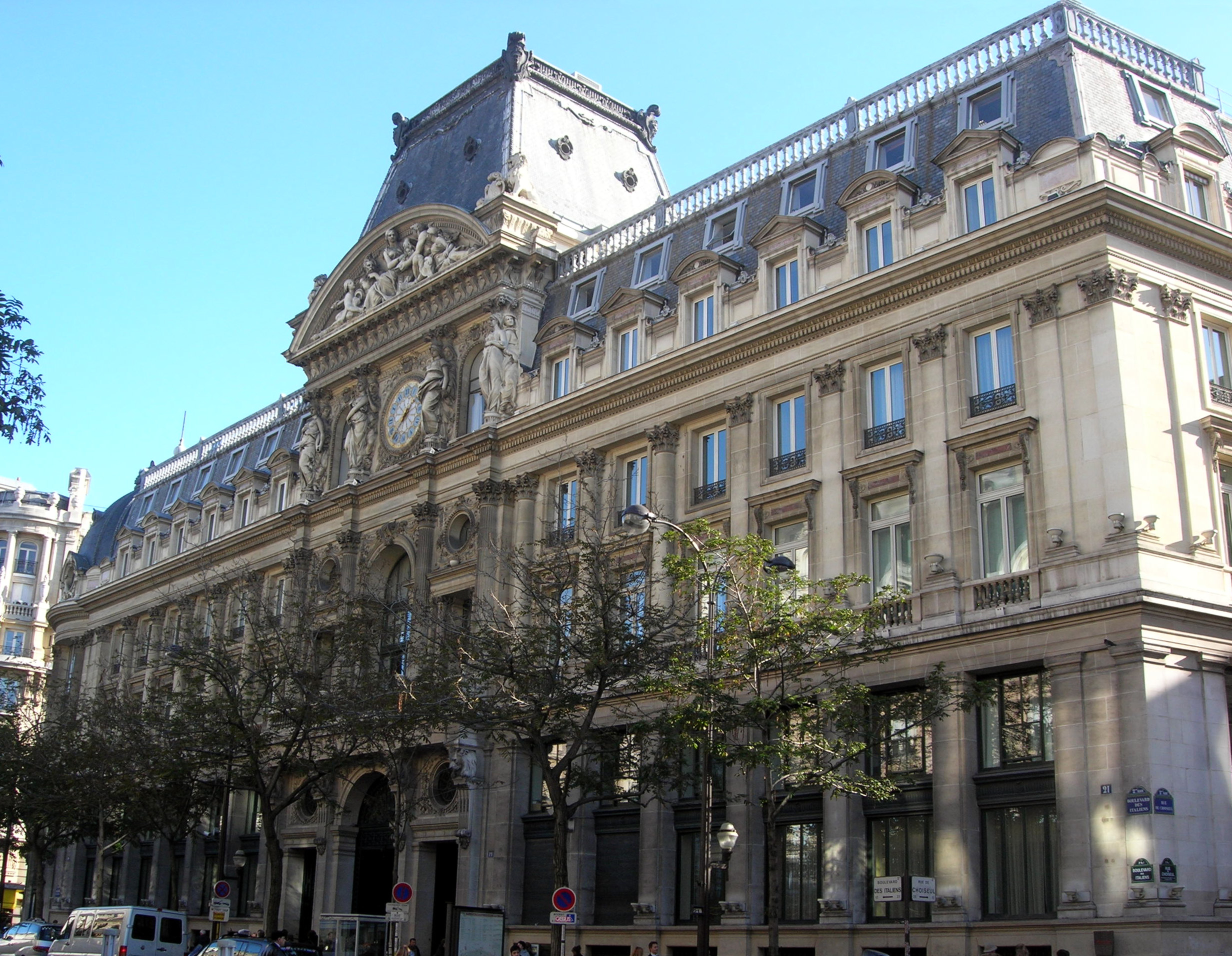
- Former Crédit Lyonnais headquarters from 1882 to 2010 at 17-23, boulevard des Italiens in Paris
- Industry: Bank
- Founded: 6 July 1863; 163 years ago in Lyon, France
- Founder: Henri Germain
- Defunct: 2003; 23 years ago
- Fate: Acquired and absorbed by Crédit Agricole
- Successor: LCL S.A.; Crédit Agricole CIB
- Headquarters: Paris, France
- Number of employees: 16,400
- Website: creditlyonnais.fr at the Wayback Machine (archive index)

Crédit Lyonnais (French: [kʁedi ljɔnɛ], lit. 'Credit [Bank] of Lyon') was a major French bank, created in 1863 and absorbed by former rival Crédit Agricole in 2003. Its head office was initially in Lyon but moved to Paris in 1882. In the early years of the 20th century, it was the world's largest bank by total assets.

Its former French retail network survives as LCL S.A., a fully owned subsidiary of Crédit Agricole, under the brand LCL adopted in 2005 with reference to "Le Crédit Lyonnais".

== History ==
=== 19th century ===
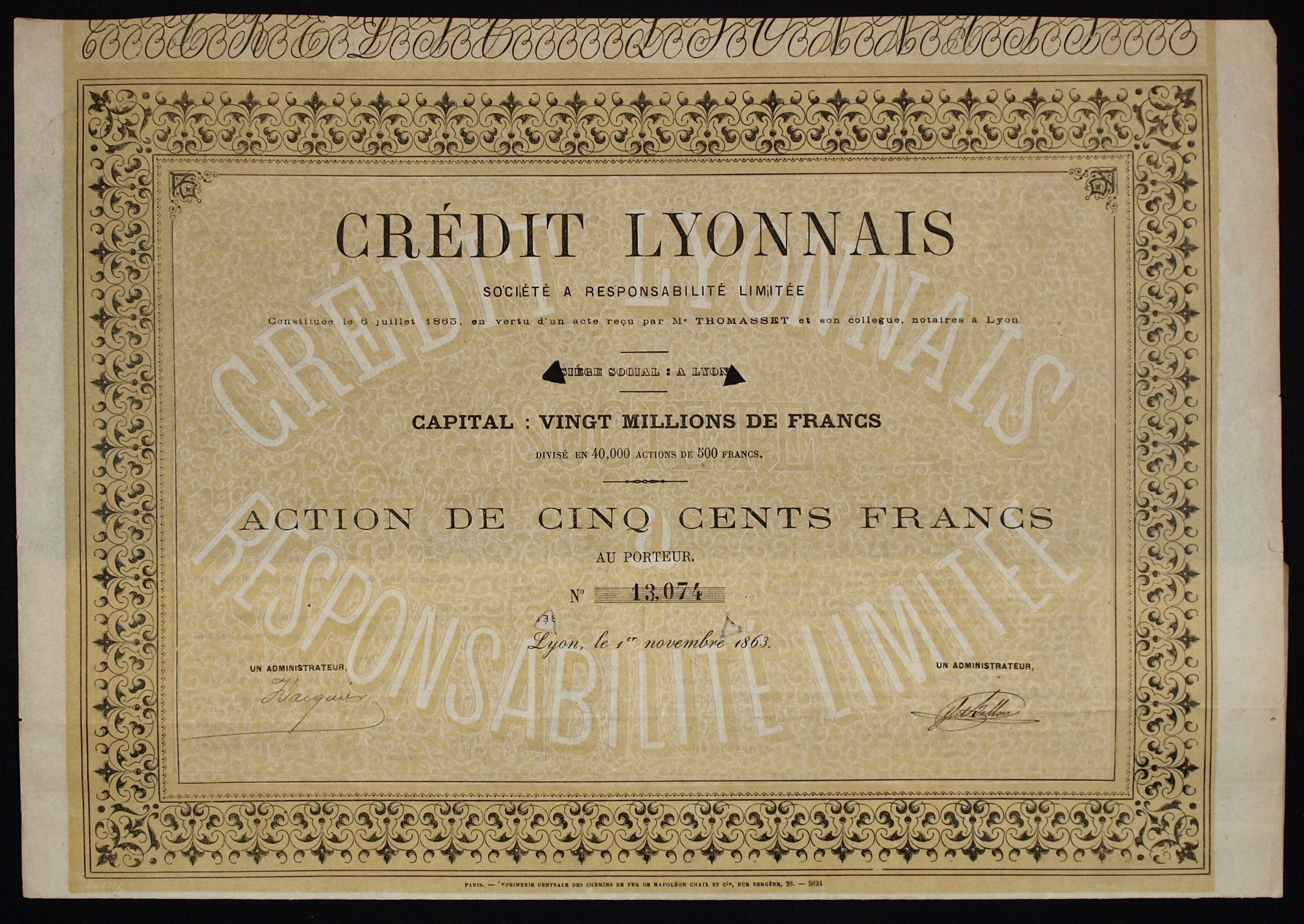
Share of the Crédit Lyonnais, issued 1 November 1863

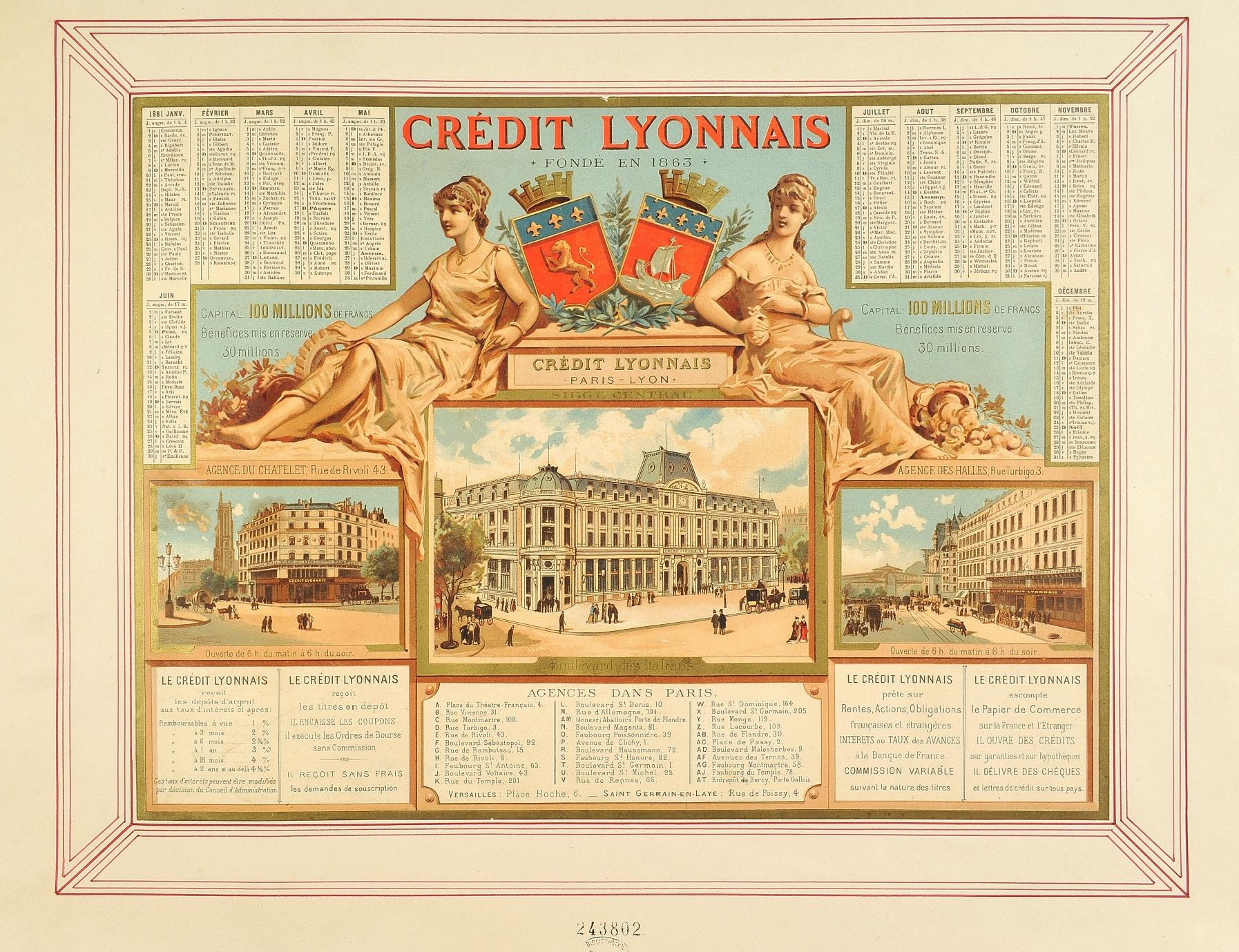
1881 Calendar advertising the Crédit Lyonnais, including the new Paris head office (center) and branches at rue de Rivoli (left) and Les Halles (right)

The creation of Crédit Lyonnais was favored by French legislation of 23 May 1863 that liberalized the creation of joint-stock companies without prior government authorization. The bank was chartered on 6 July 1863 by Henri Germain, who was the largest shareholder with 5.4 percent of equity capital and became its first chairman. Prominent promoters of Saint-Simonianism initially participated in the venture, namely François Barthélemy Arlès-Dufour who was instrumental in convincing Germain to initiate the project, Paulin Talabot, and Barthélemy Enfantin, as well as industrialists such as Eugène Schneider. Crédit Lyonnais then started its operations on July 26, initially in the recently opened Palais du Commerce of Lyon.

The bank initially served local businesses in Lyon, but opened branches in Paris and Marseille as early as 1865. Furthermore, Germain married into a Parisian family and entered national politics in 1869. During the Franco-Prussian War in 1870, he moved some of the bank's funds to London for safety and thus created Crédit Lyonnais's first foreign branch there. He also participated in the negotiation of the financial clauses of the Treaty of Frankfurt that ended the war in 1871.

From 1876, Germain directed the building of an ostentatious headquarters building in Paris, with architectural details modeled on the Louvre Palace. The first phase of that Parisian Crédit Lyonnais headquarters was completed in 1883, but it kept expanding until occupying the entire city block in 1913 after Germain's death. The bank branch located there opened as early as 21 March 1878, inaugurated in the presence of Léon Gambetta. In 1882, the bank's head office was formally transferred from Lyon to the new building, even though it remained legally registered in Lyon. Beyond the prestige head office, in the late 1870s the Crédit Lyonnais aggressively developed its network of Parisian locations, opening 23 in 1879 alone.

After London in 1870, Crédit Lyonnais soon embarked in an ambitious drive of international expansion, opening branches in Alexandria (1874), Constantinople and Cairo (1875), Geneva, Madrid and Port Said (1876), Vienna (1877), Saint Petersburg (1878, initially under an individual name due to restrictive regulations that were lifted the next year), New York City (1879, but closed in 1882 after facing punitive taxation), Barcelona, Brussels, and Smyrna (1888), Moscow (1891), Jerusalem and Odesa (1892), Lisbon (1893), Bombay and Calcutta (1895, closed the next year), Porto and Valencia (1897), Seville and San Sebastián (1900). In Asia, other than its two short-lived Indian branches in 1895–1896, Crédit Lyonnais participated in collective endeavors through its shareholding in the Banque de l'Indochine from 1896 and later participation in the China Consortium. Overall, Crédit Lyonnais became a major player in the placement of foreign government bonds, not least of the Russian Empire, thus participating in directing the large savings of French households to destinations abroad, which resulted in the then widespread perception of France as the "banker of the world".

=== 20th century ===
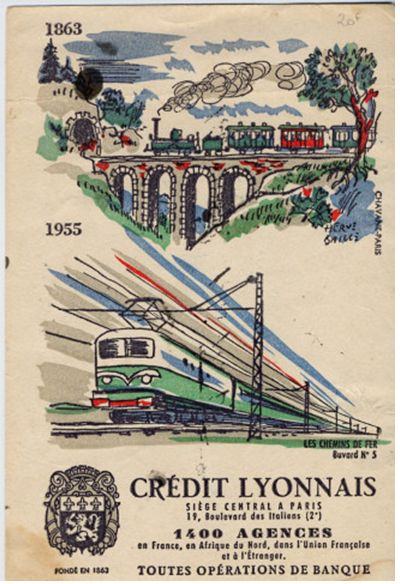
1955 advertising poster

In 1900, Crédit Lyonnais overtook Lloyds Bank and Deutsche Bank to become the world's largest bank by total assets, a position it retained until overtaken by Société Générale in 1920.

Crédit Lyonnais's franchise was negatively impacted by Russia's repeal of its debt obligations following the October Revolution of 1917, and was otherwise disrupted by World War I. In the spring of 1918, it evacuated some of its funds and records from Paris to protect them from a possible German advance. In the postwar years, it faced social unrest with a major employee strike in mid-1925. In the interwar period, it exited from Smyrna and Jerusalem in 1927, and from Istanbul in 1933.

Crédit Lyonnais was nationalized on 1 January 1946 together with the three other major French depository banks, namely Banque Nationale pour le Commerce et l'Industrie, Comptoir National d'Escompte de Paris, and Société Générale. It kept expanding abroad in the new context of decolonization. By 1974, it had 1,905 branches and 47,000 employees. It re-established a presence in Moscow in 1972, the first Western bank to do so.

In 1980, Crédit Lyonnais acquired half of Slavenburg's Bank of Rotterdam, then facing decline amid corruption allegations. By 1983, CL took full control and renamed it Crédit Lyonnais Bank Nederland (CLBN).

In 1987, the bank strengthened its investment banking operation under the semi-autonomous brand Clinvest. Then under Jean-Yves Haberer, appointed chairman in 1988, the bank embarked on a highly aggressive expansion strategy both domestically and internationally, including by providing favorable terms of financing to politically connected projects, companies and entrepreneurs. In 1989 it created Crédit Lyonnais Europe, a wholly owned subsidiary that was intended to embody its leading position in what was expected to be a forthcoming European banking market consolidation. In 1992, it acquired Bank für Gemeinwirtschaft in Germany as part of a European development strategy that also entailed the purchase of smaller banks in Italy and Spain. Bad loans started mounting in 1992, however, and the bank had to disclose a large loss for its calendar year 1993.

In the course of that expansion, Crédit Lyonnais became the leading lender to Hollywood studios in the late 1980s, led by Frans Afman, head of entertainment loans at CLBN; Afman had previously begun his dealings with film studios and producers in the 1970s at Slavenburg's, which transferred to CLBN in 1983. Clients included independent film studios Castle Rock Entertainment, Weintraub Entertainment Group, Nelson Entertainment, Vestron Pictures, and Carolco Pictures. Many of these companies underwent financial difficulties.

It also financed Giancarlo Parretti's takeover of Metro-Goldwyn-Mayer in 1990 for $1.25 billion (having previously financed his takeover of another CLBN client, The Cannon Group). However, Parretti started looting the company, fired most of the accounting staff, appointed his then 21-year-old daughter to a senior financial post, and used company money to buy lavish gifts for several girlfriends. By June 1991, CL's upper management, fearing that Parretti's continued ownership would bring MGM to rack and ruin, took action; under the terms of an April agreement that gave it control of Parretti's MGM stock, it fired Parretti and began a lawsuit against him. However, CL soon faced intense scrutiny for its dealings with Parretti. Overall, CL lost $5 billion from its Hollywood deals. Afman left the employ of CLBN entirely during this period.

The bank underwent harsh restructuring under new chairman Jean Peyrelevade, appointed in November 1993, and general manager Pascal Lamy, appointed a year later, and was recapitalized by the French government. In April 1995, the government formed a "bad bank", the Consortium de réalisation, to which it transferred the Crédit Lyonnais's non-core assets. Among other transactions, the CDR notably agreed to pay US$525 million to the California Department of Insurance in order to head off a lawsuit over the Executive Life insurance scandal.

The CDR also ended up with the various film libraries from now defunct film production companies that defaulted on their loans. The library was known as the Epic film library. The Loeb & Loeb law firm spent 4 years determining the full extent of the film assets. In late 1997, PolyGram Filmed Entertainment outbid Disney, Metro-Goldwyn-Mayer, Live Entertainment and several other companies, for the Epic library at $225 million. Despite losing the bid, MGM would acquire the Epic library and the rest of PolyGram's pre-1996 library in 1999. To allow the bailout, the European Commission imposed severe limitations, principally on the bank's international activities, and the bank was forced to sell many entities in the following years (the assets of the infamous CLBN, for instance, were sold to Generale Bank of Belgium in August 1995). In total, it cost French taxpayers nearly €15 billion.

To cap the sequence of misfortune, the Crédit Lyonnais's storied Parisian headquarters was partly destroyed by fire on 5 May 1996. The bank returned to profit in 1997. In 1999, Crédit Lyonnais's shares were successfully floated on the Paris Bourse, thus partly reversing the nationalization of 1946. (There had only been a limited opening of capital to employees between 1973 and 1982.)

=== 21st century ===
In November 2002, the government conducted an auction for its residual ten-percent stake, which was won by BNP Paribas, but Crédit Agricole subsequently launched a successful friendly takeover bid and took full ownership of Crédit Lyonnais in July 2003.

Crédit Agricole merged its own investment banking arm, Banque Indosuez, with Crédit Lyonnais's and renamed the merged entity Calyon (for Crédit Agricole Lyonnais) in 2004, but that brand was changed in 2010 to Crédit Agricole CIB (for Commercial and Investment Bank), reflecting the gradual phasing out of the Crédit Lyonnais identity. Also in 2010, the bank's staff eventually moved out of the historic headquarters on the boulevard des Italiens, relocating to the Parisian suburb of Montrouge. Meanwhile, in 2005, the Crédit Lyonnais brand, perceived as tainted by the 1990s turmoil, had been replaced in the French retail network with the blander LCL (introduced as "Crédit Lyonnais, just more dynamic and better performing"), and the number of LCL branches was gradually decreased in subsequent years.

=== Gallery ===
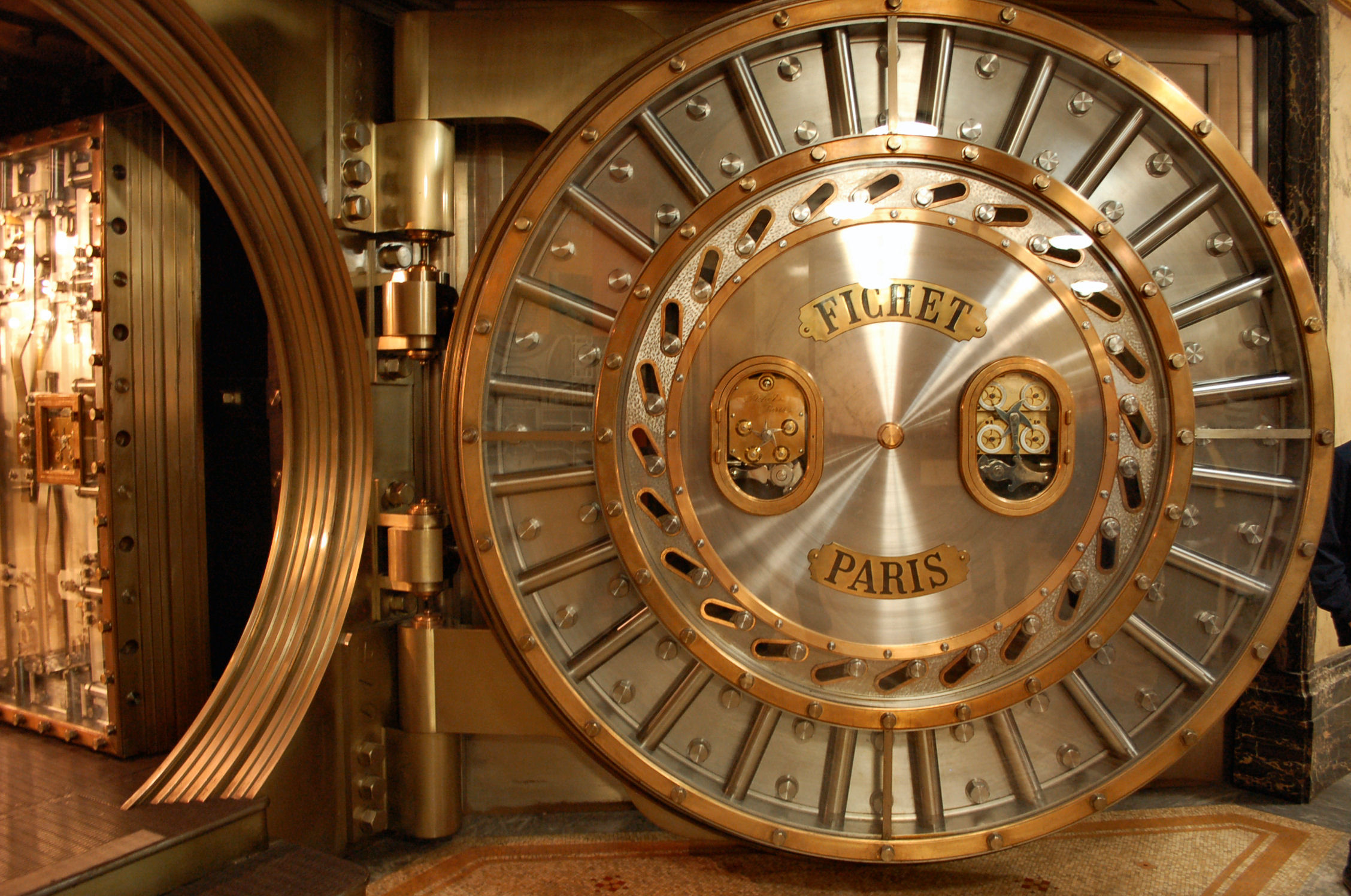
Safe door in the Paris head office

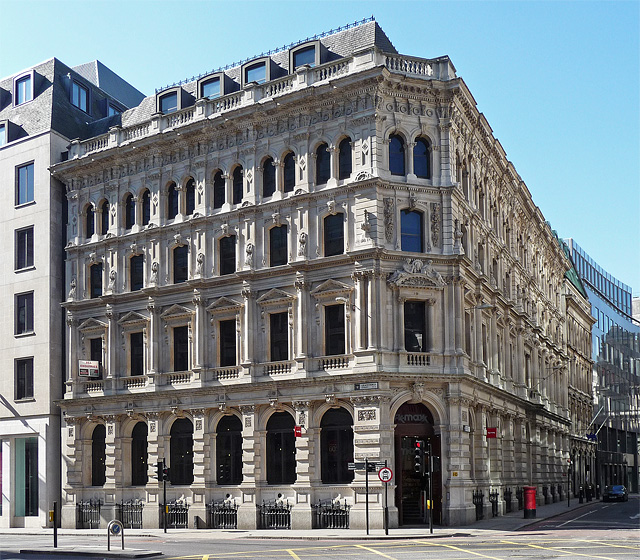
39-40 Lombard Street, London, Crédit Lyonnais branch office in London from the 1880s to the 1970s

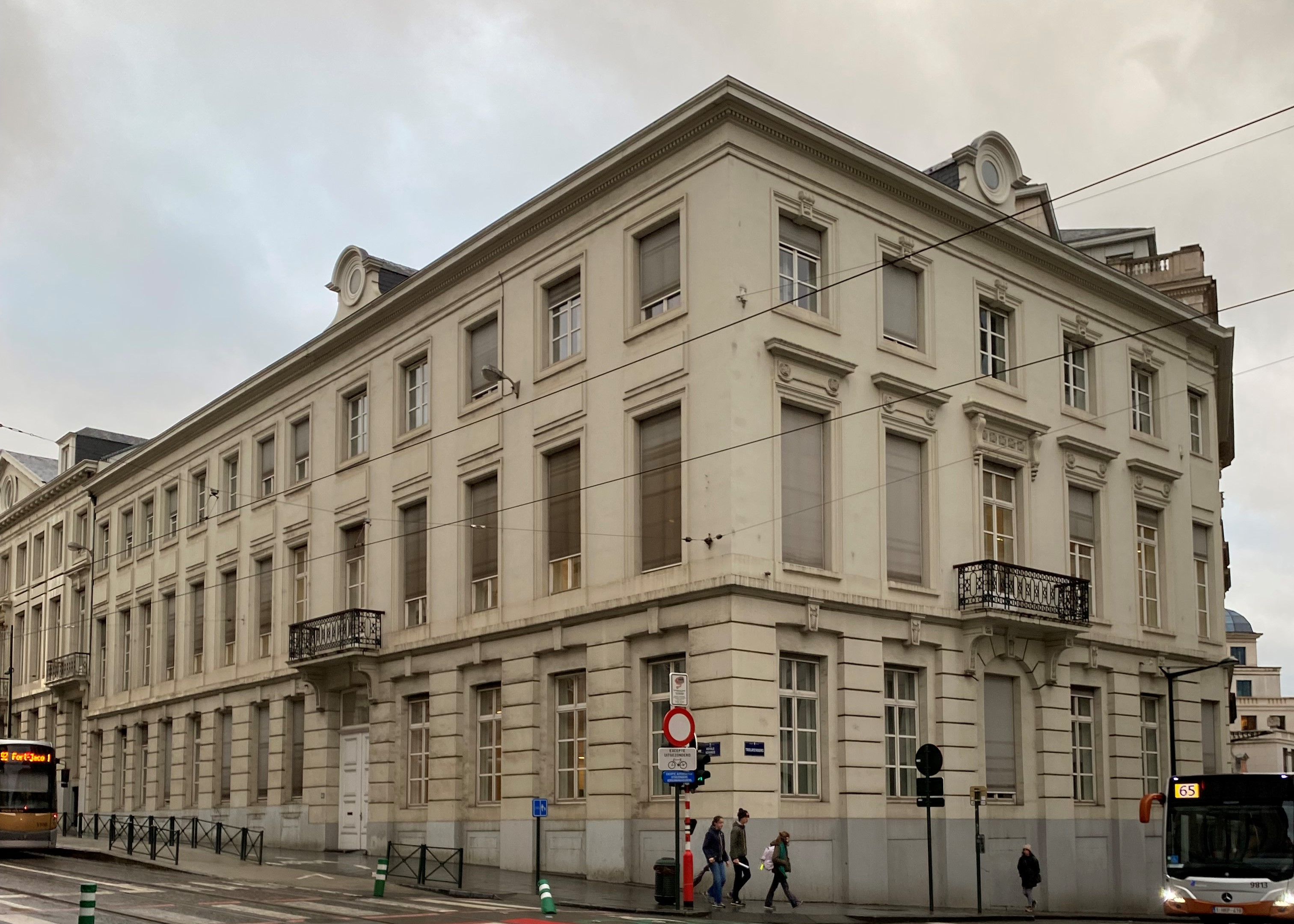
Building at Rue Royale 80 in Brussels, branch office of Crédit Lyonnais from 1888 to the late 20th century

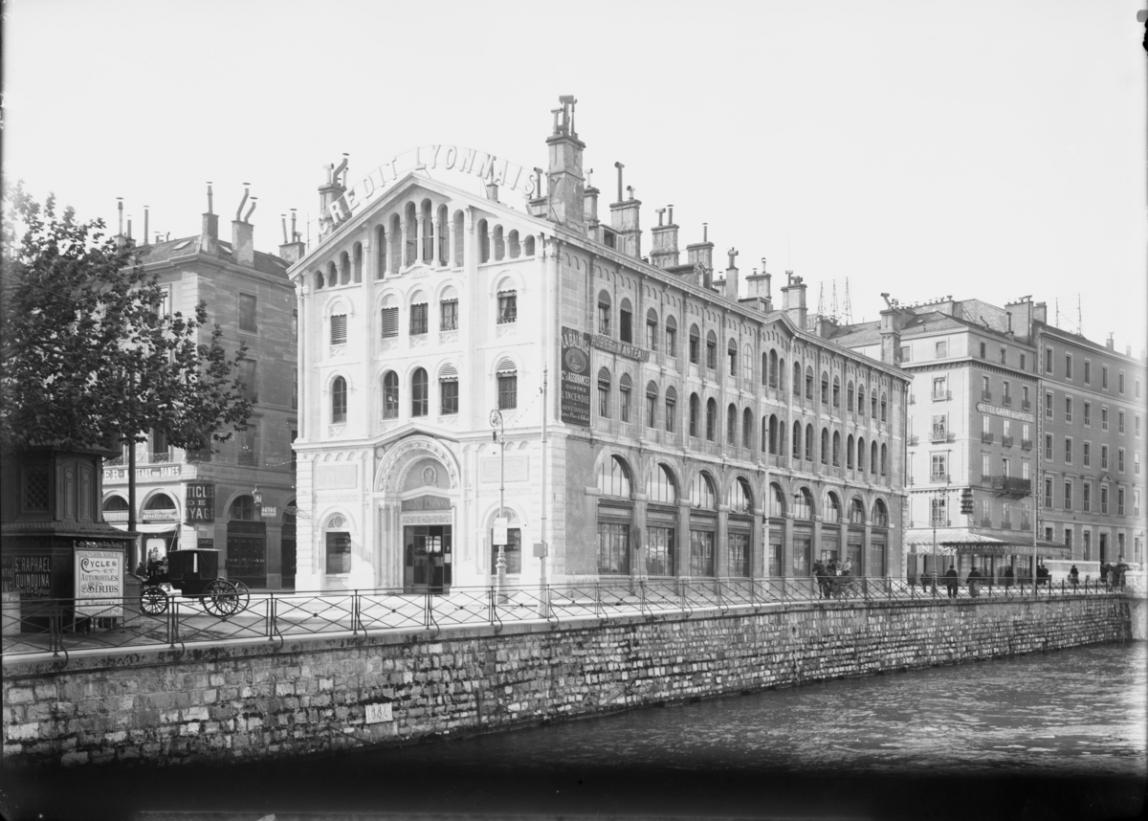
Branch office in Geneva, ca. 1900

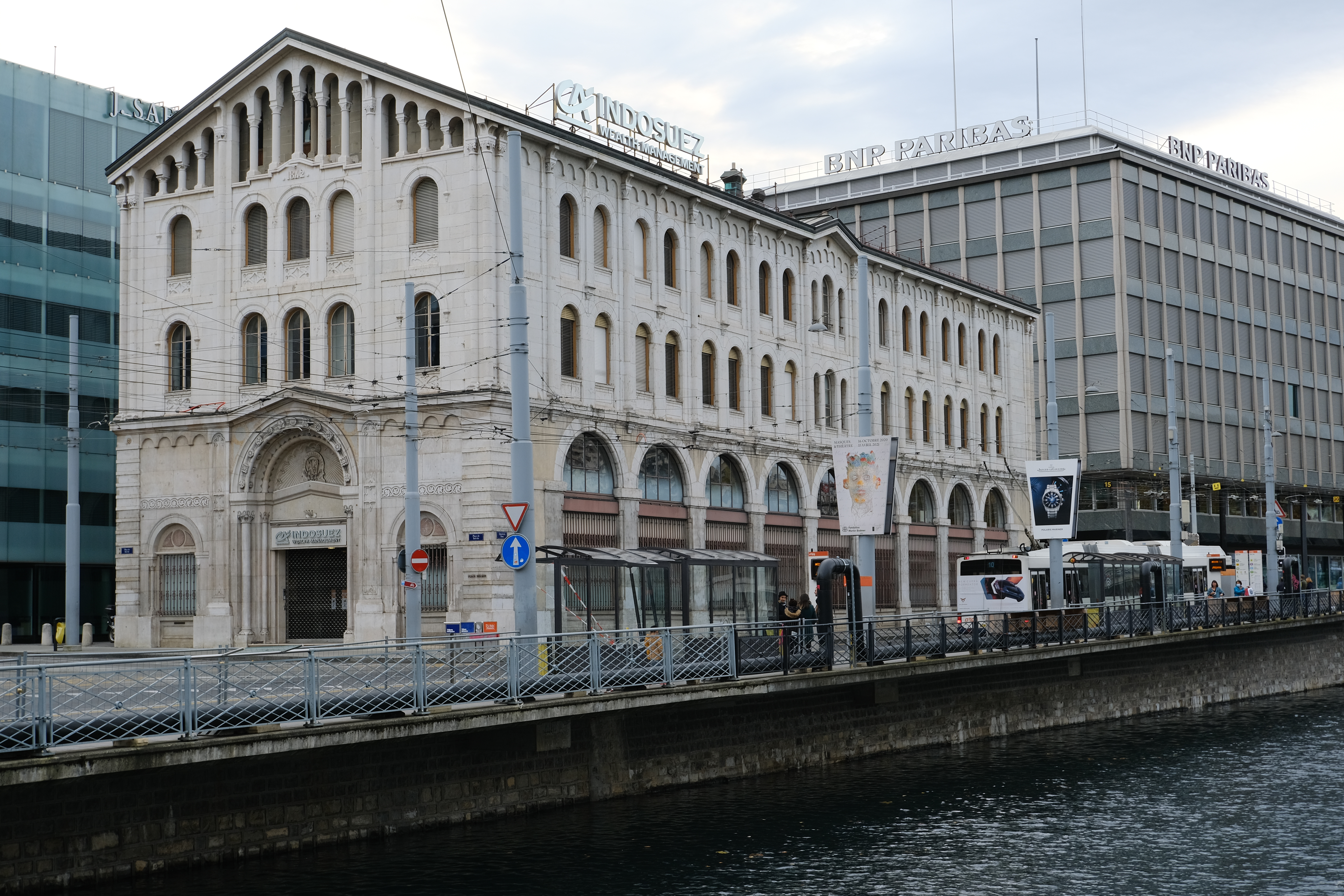
The same building in 2020, main local office of Indosuez Wealth Management

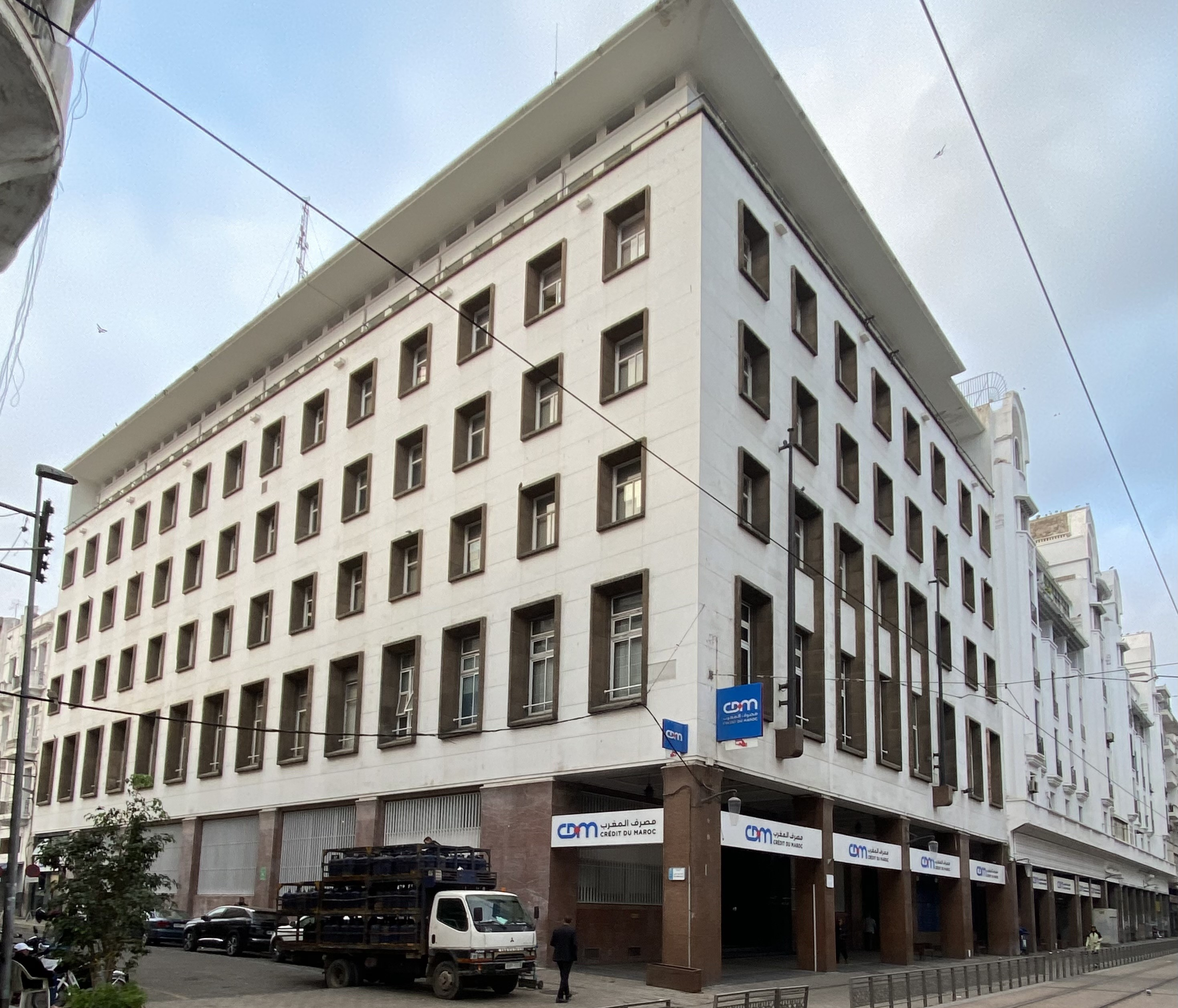
Former branch building in Casablanca, later part of the head office complex of Crédit du Maroc

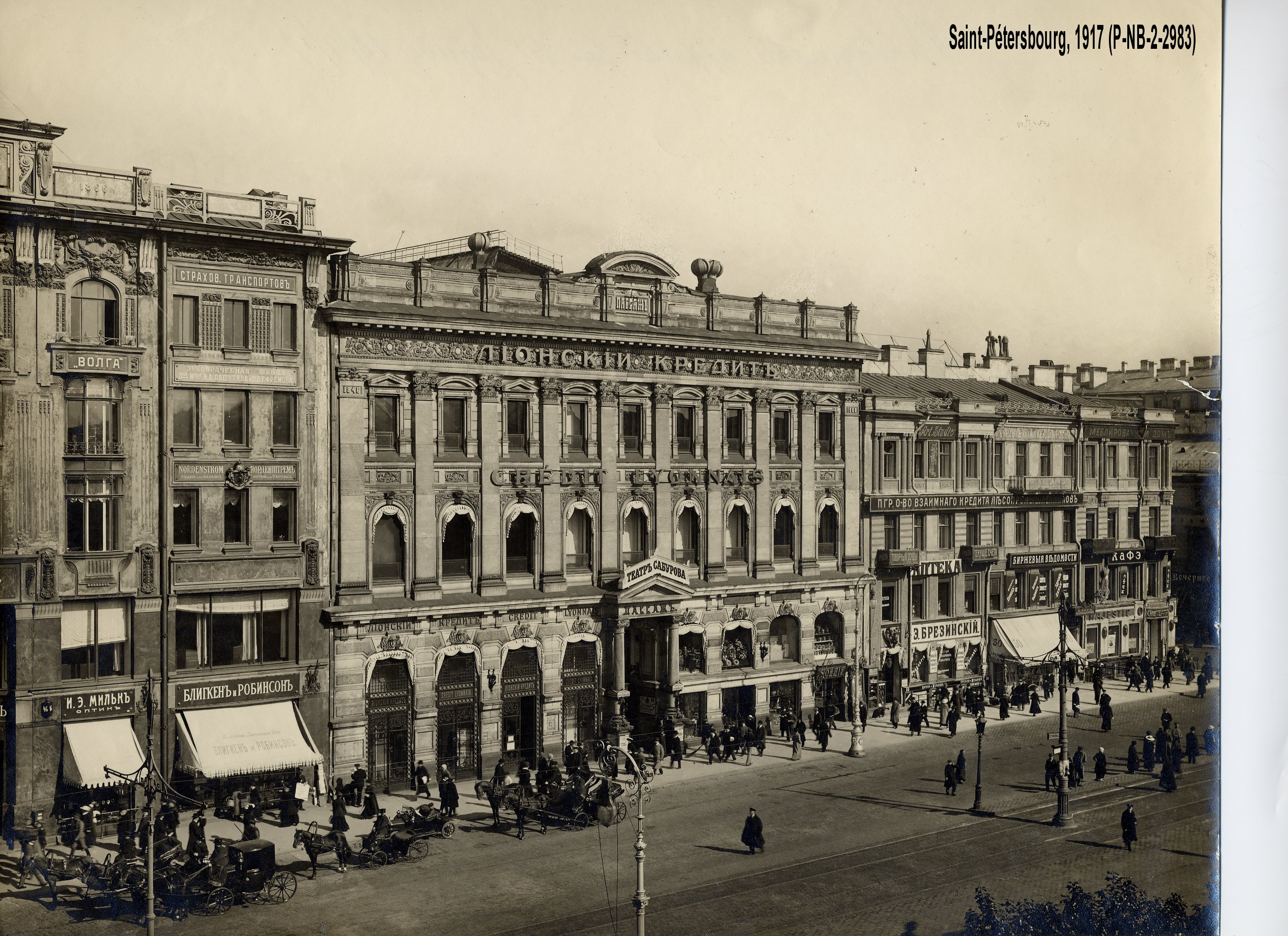
Branch office in Saint Petersburg, 1917

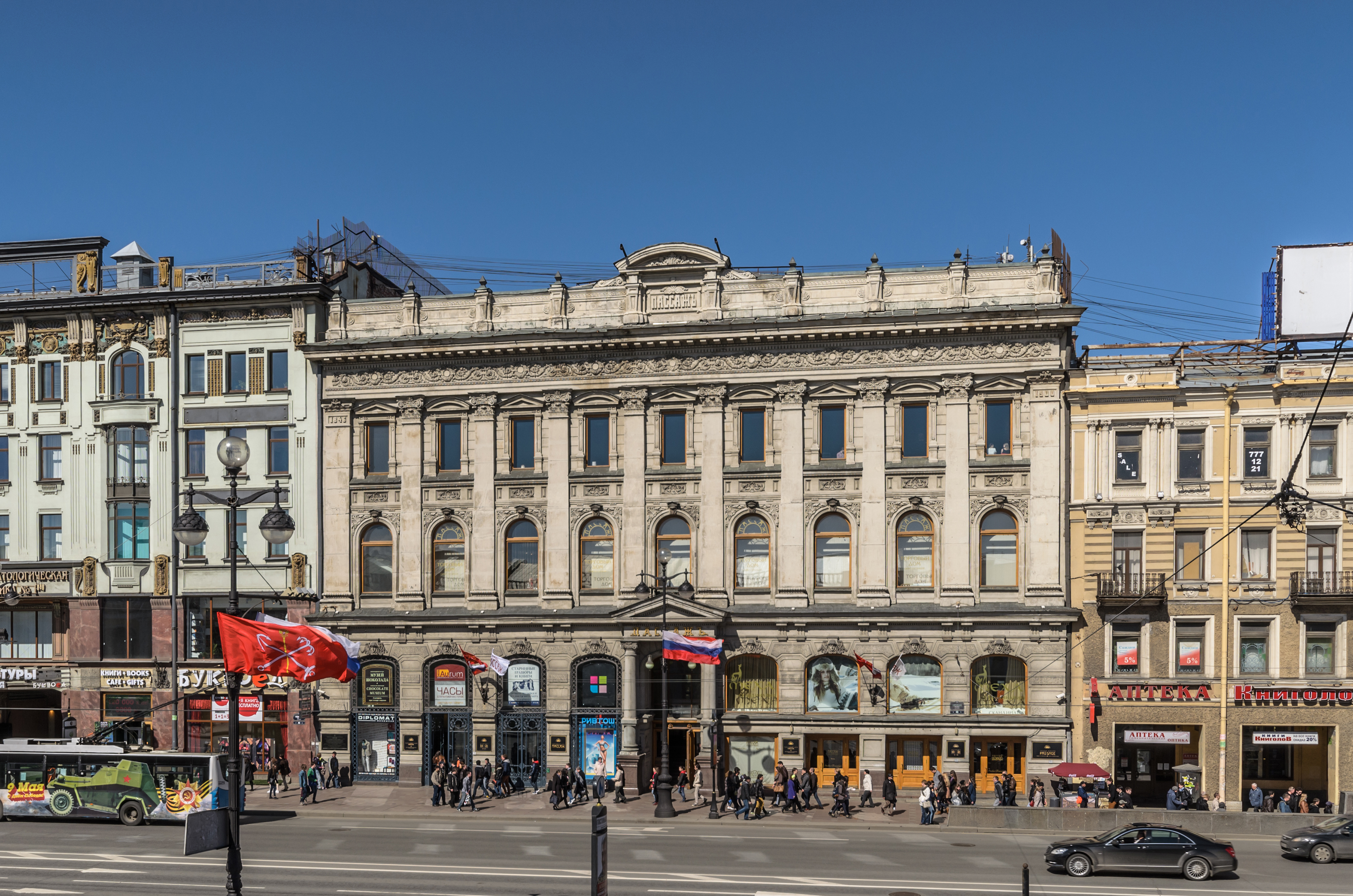
The same building in 2013, Passage department store

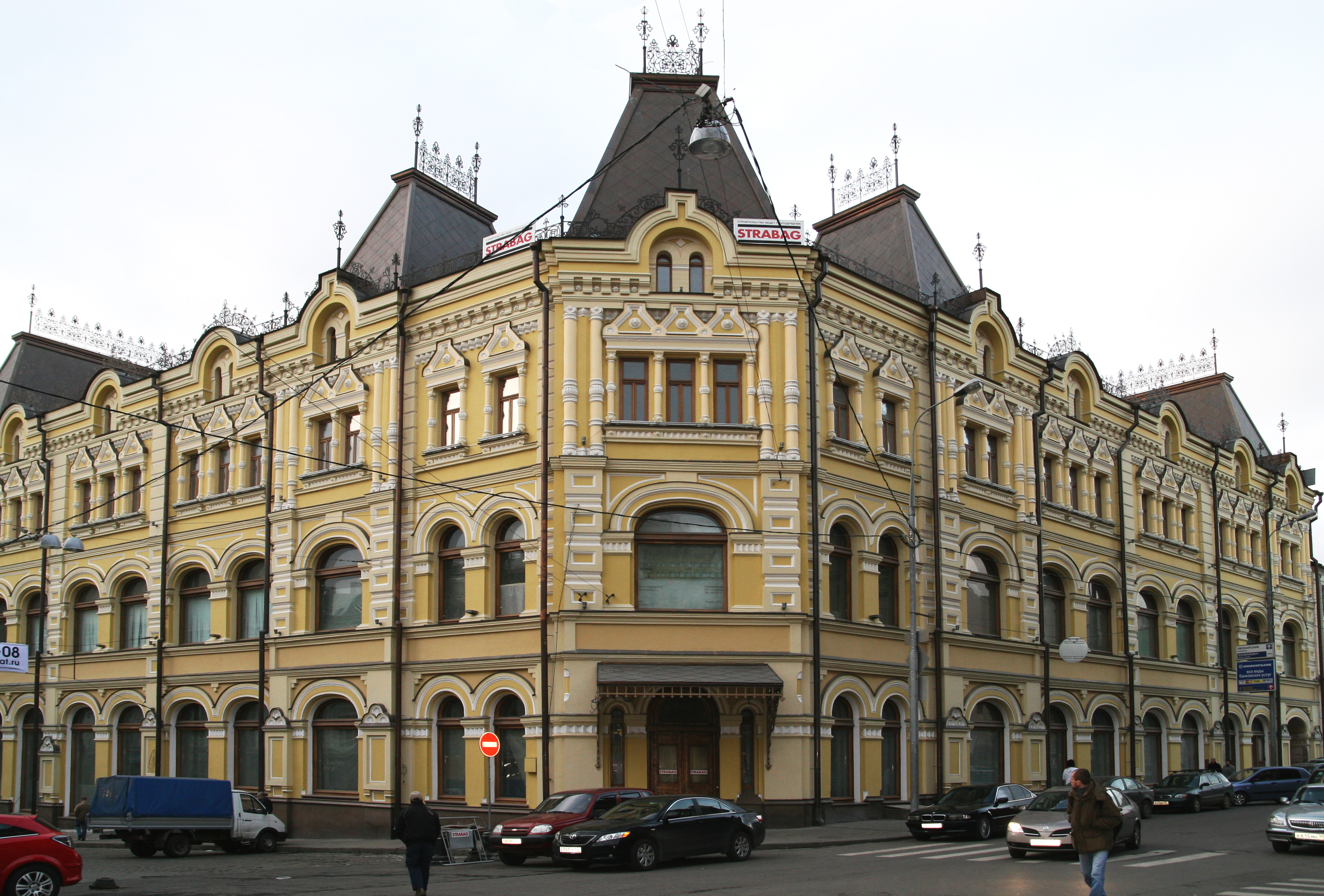
Building at 13, Kuznetsky Most Street (angle of Rozhdestvenka street), Crédit Lyonnais's branch office in Moscow until 1917; more recently used for offices of VTB Bank

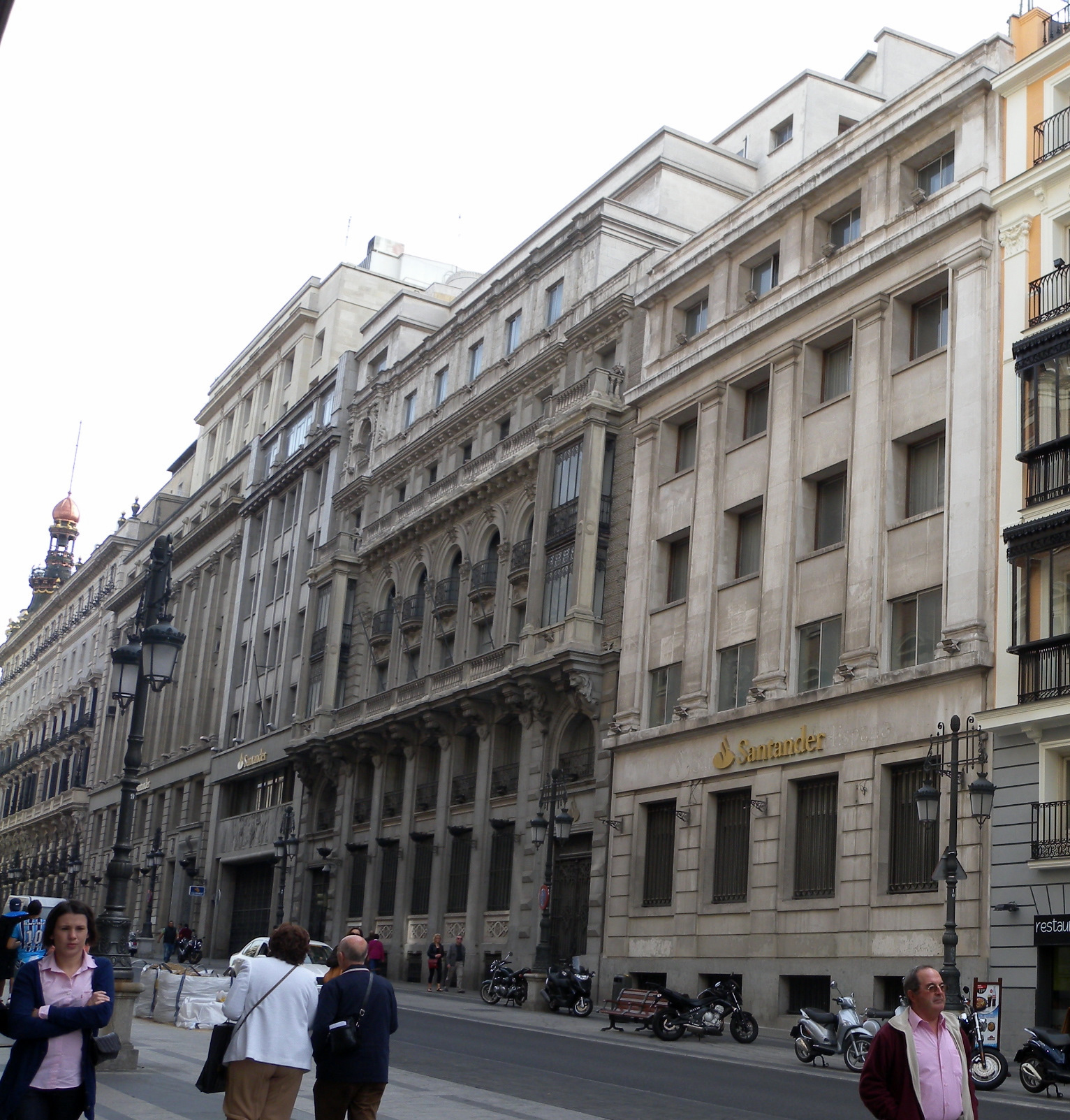
Former branch office opened in 1907 on Calle de Alcalá 8 in Madrid (center), designed by José Urioste Velada, later remodeled

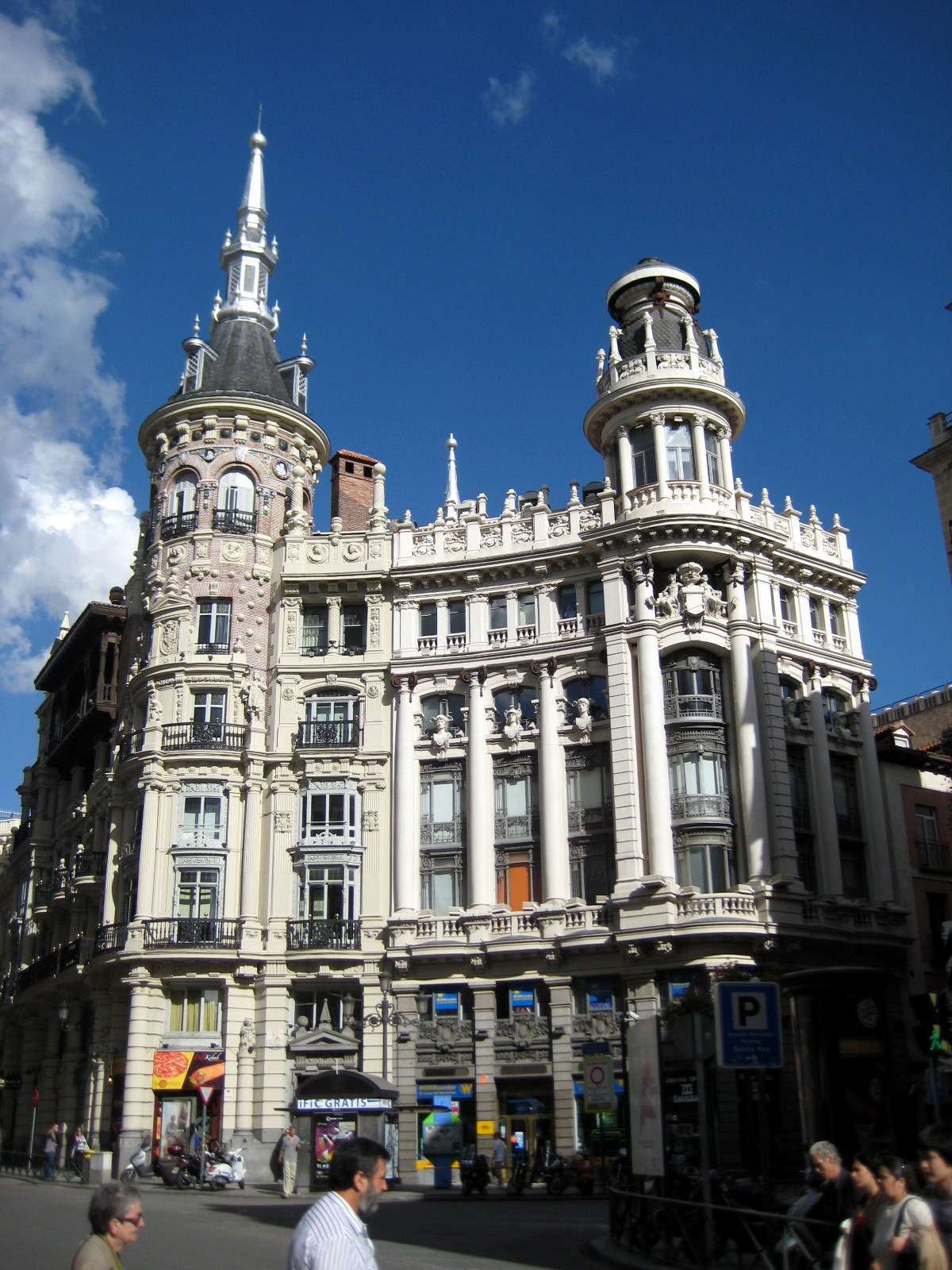
Casa de Allende, Crédit Lyonnais branch office in Madrid from 1947 (left), 2010

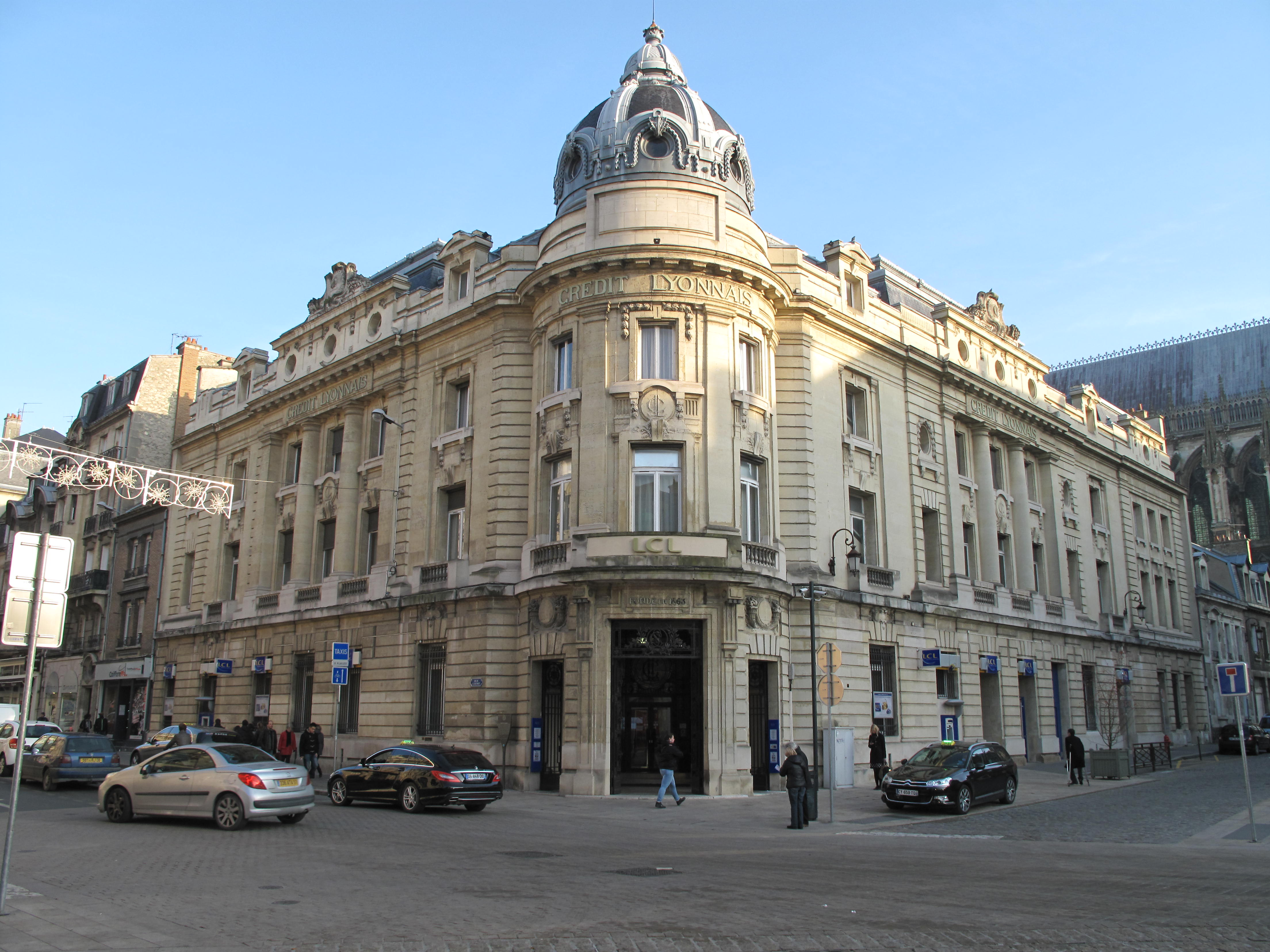
Branch office in Reims

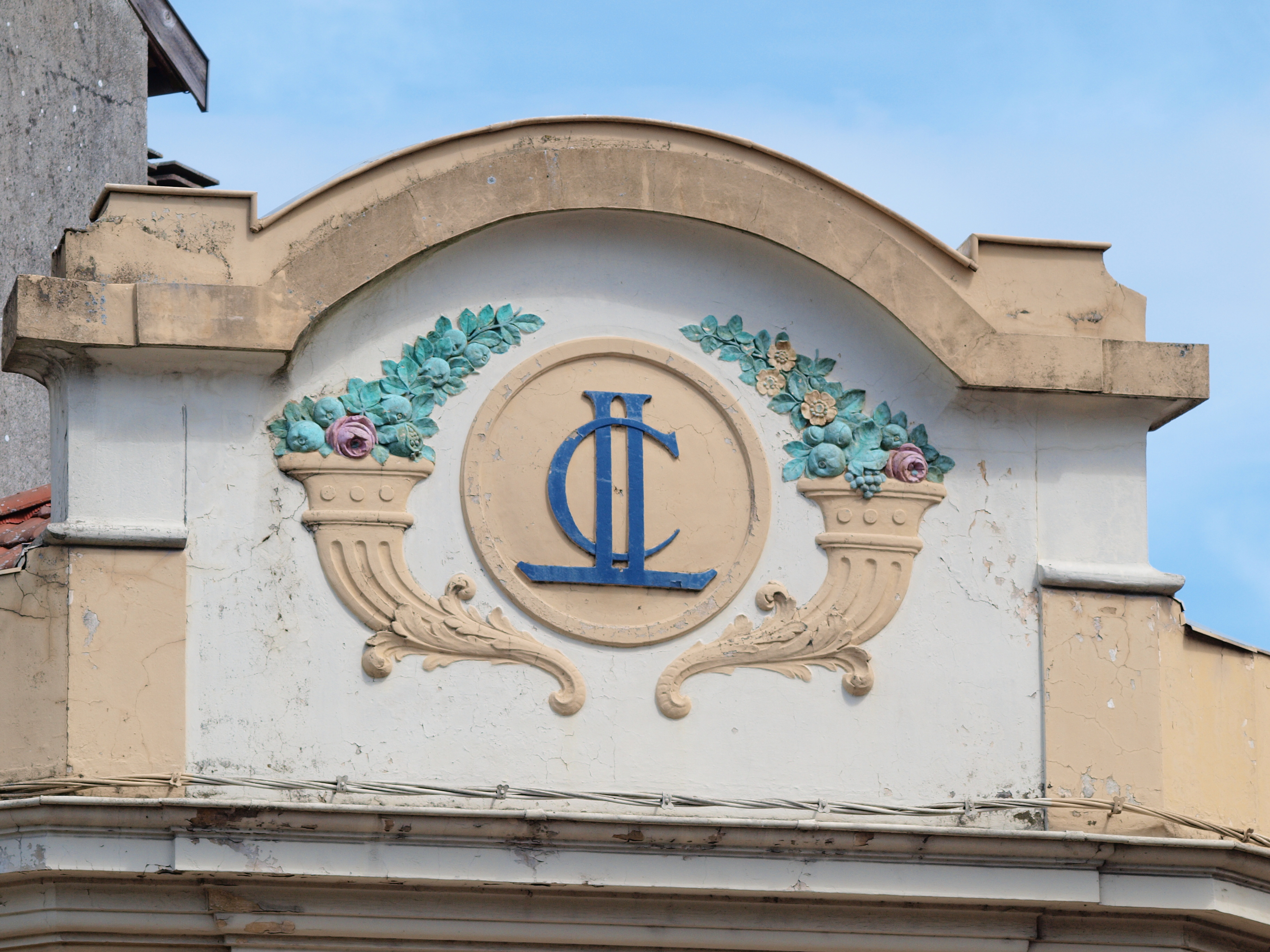
Early version of the Credit Lyonnais logo on a branch building in Vouziers, France

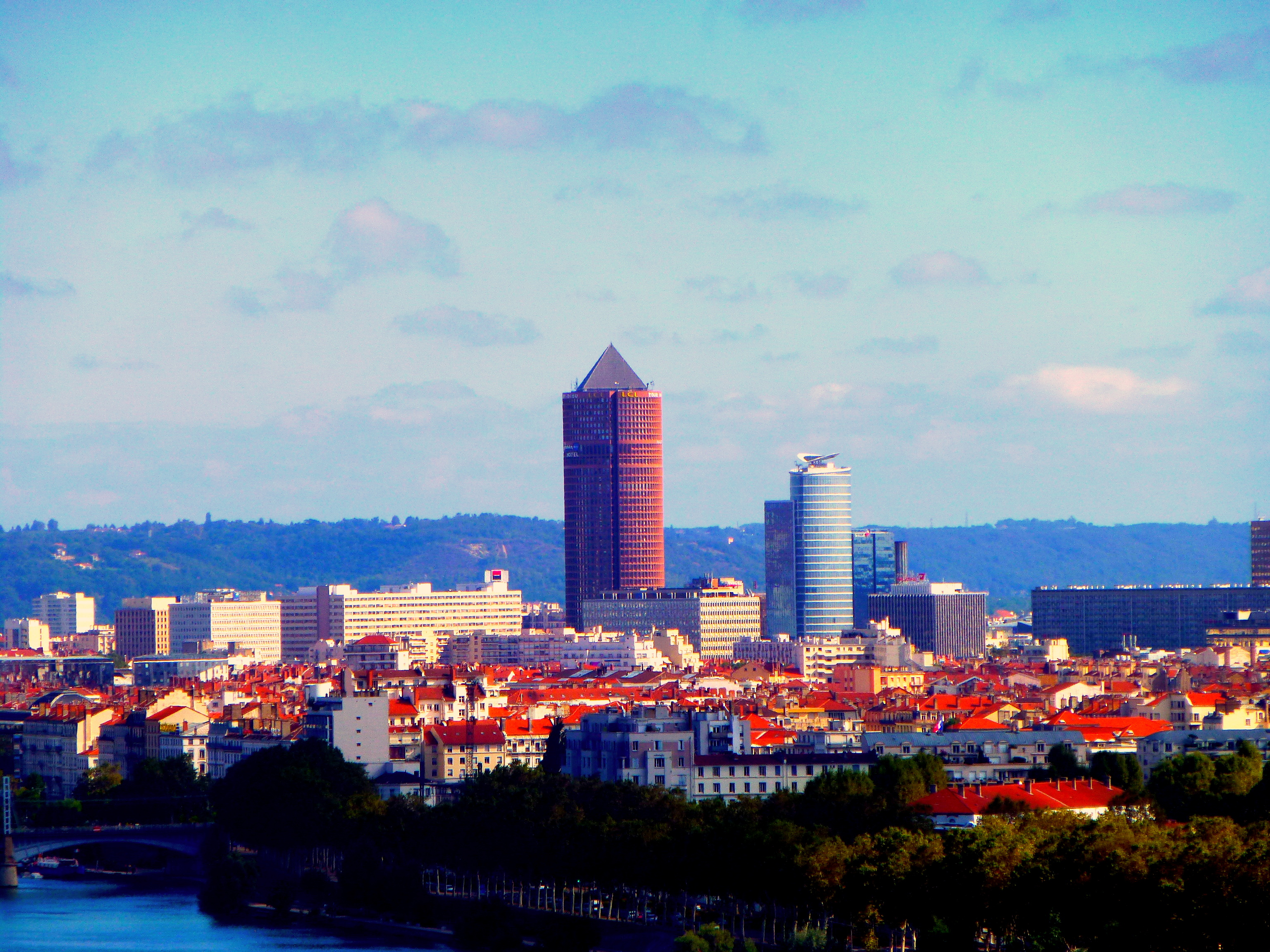
Tour Part-Dieu in Lyon, financed by Crédit Lyonnais in the 1970s and formerly known as the Tour du Crédit Lyonnais

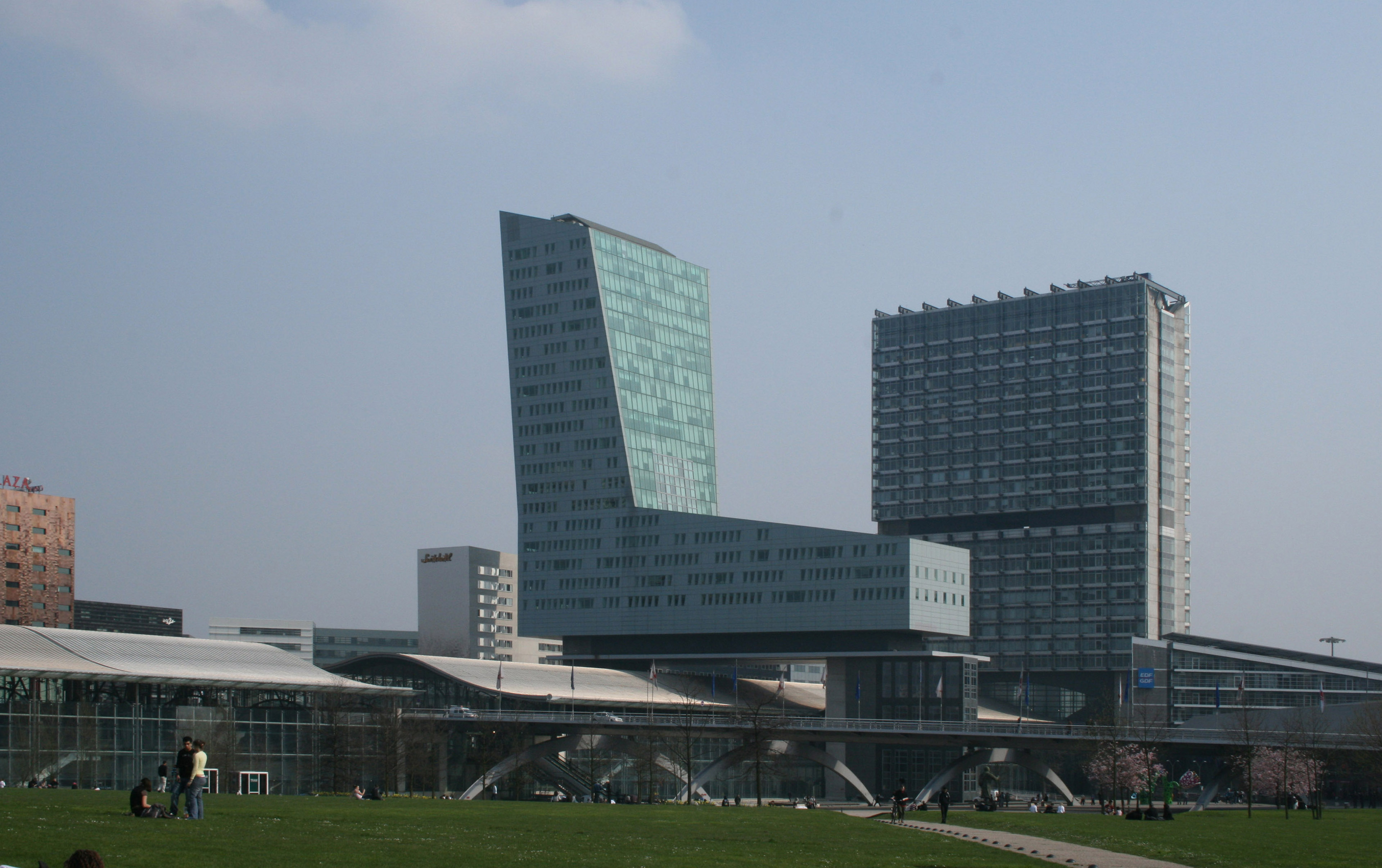
Tour de Lille in Lille, also known locally until 2006 as the Tour du Crédit Lyonnais

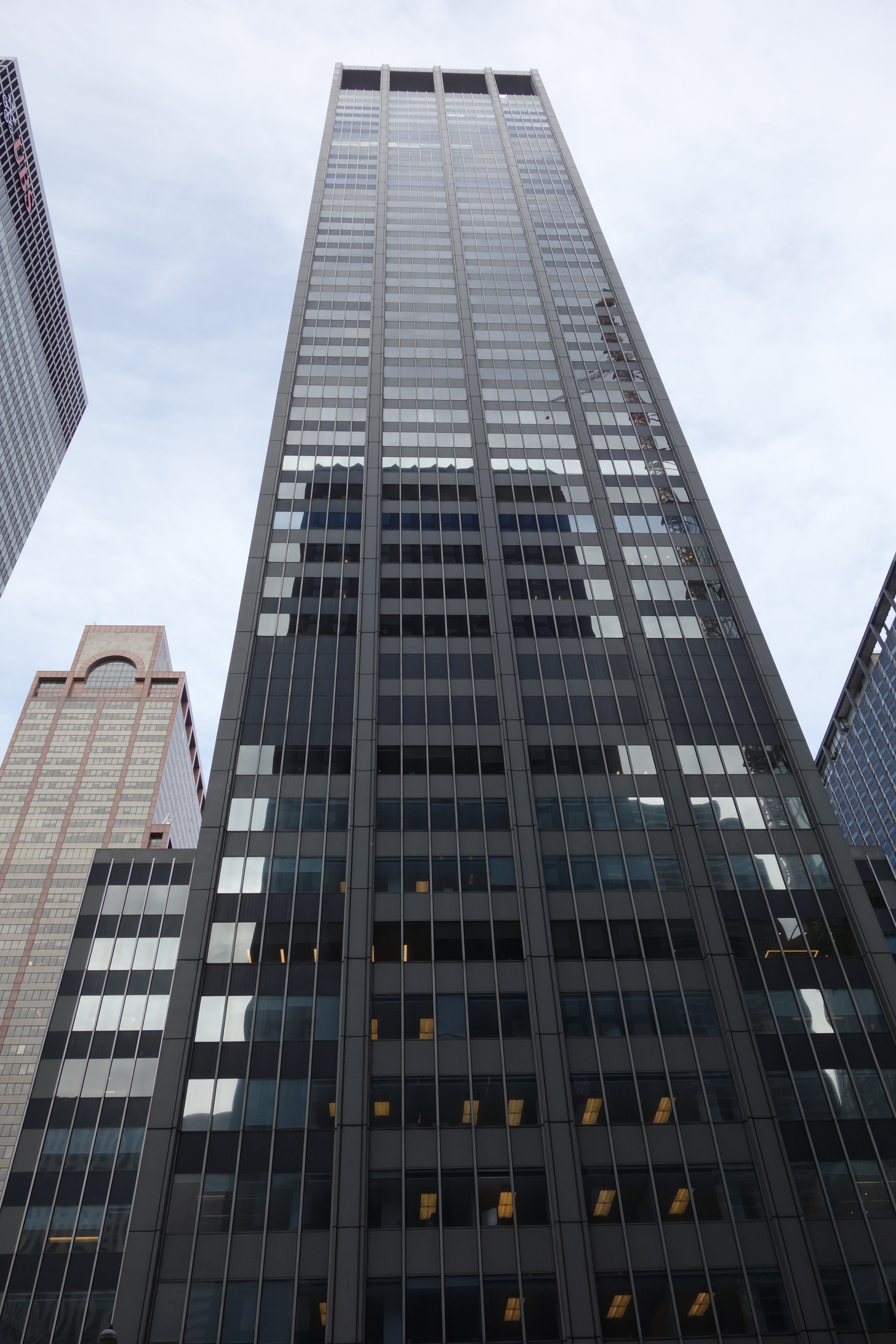
1301 Avenue of the Americas in New York City, once known as the Credit Lyonnais Building

== Leadership and personnel ==
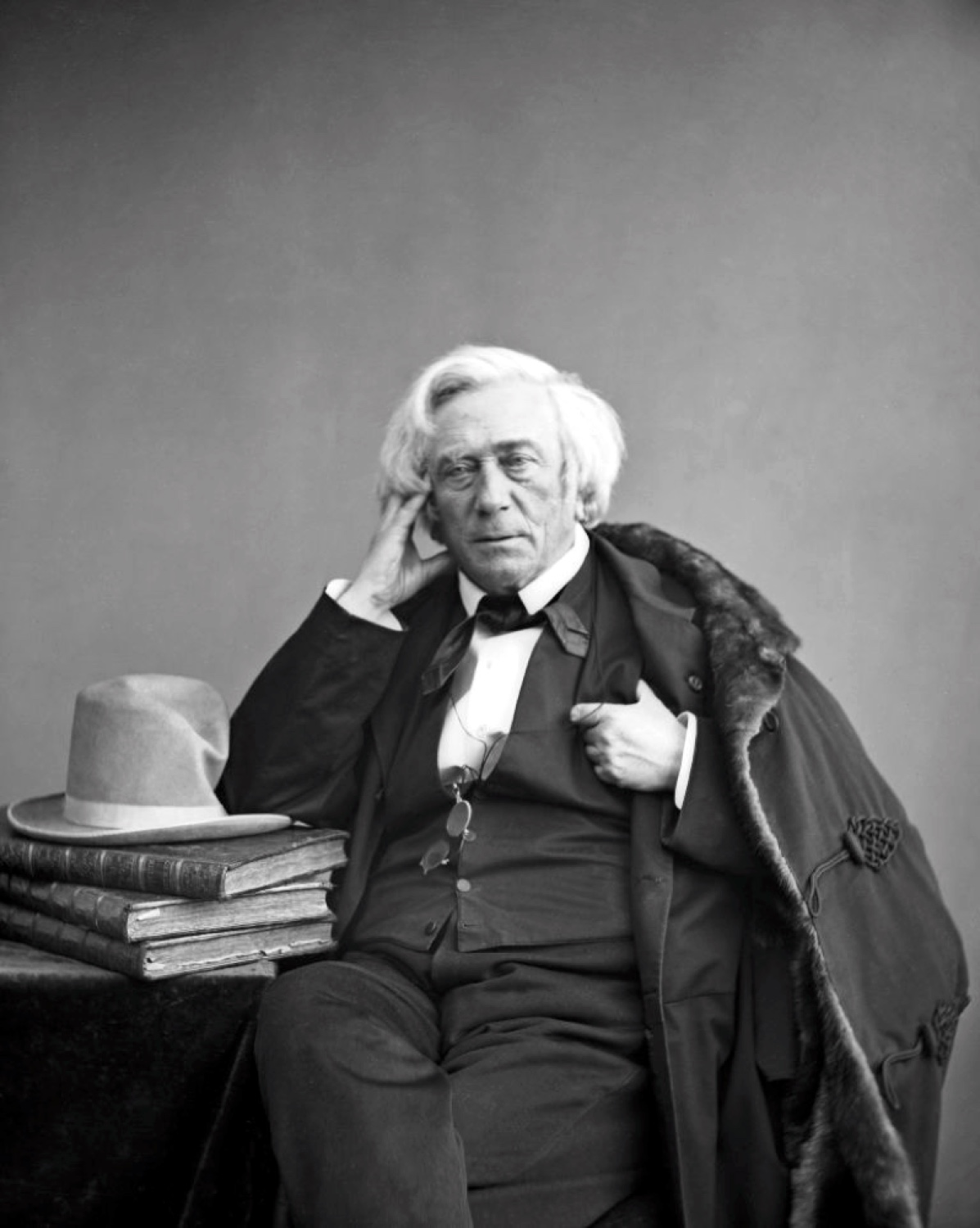
François Barthélemy Arlès-Dufour (1797–1872), cofounder of Crédit Lyonnais

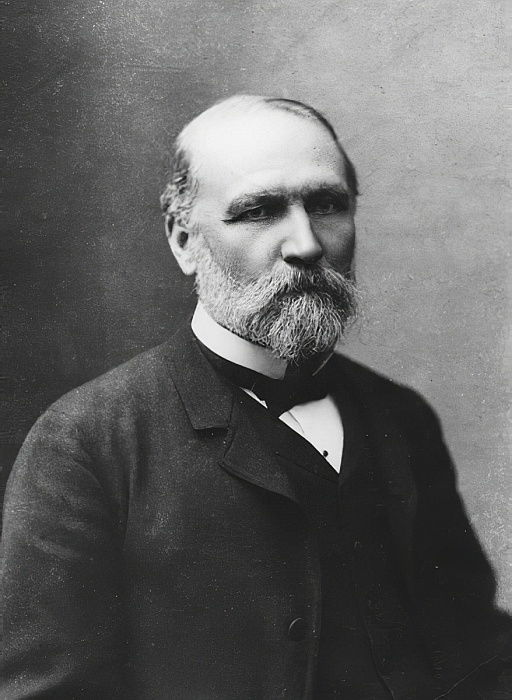
Henri Germain (1824–1905), cofounder and first chairman

- Henri Germain, Chairman 1863–1905
- Adrien Mazerat, Chairman 1905–1907
- Émile Béthenod, Chairman 1907–1922
- Georges Brincard, Chairman 1922–1945
- Édouard Escarra, Chairman 1946
- Louis Escallier, Chairman 1946–1949
- Édouard Escarra, Chairman 1949–1955
- Olivier Moreau-Néret, Chairman 1955–1961
- Marcel Wiriath, Chairman 1961–1967
- François Bloch-Lainé, Chairman 1967–1974
- Jacques Chaine, Chairman 1974–1976
- Claude Pierre-Brossolette, Chairman 1976–1982
- Jean Deflassieux, Chairman 1982–1986
- Jean-Maxime Lévêque, Chairman 1986–1989
- Jean-Yves Haberer, Chairman 1989–1993
- Jean Peyrelevade, Chairman 1993–2003
- Jean Laurent, Chairman 2003–2005

Pascal Lamy was Crédit Lyonnais's Chief Executive (French: directeur général) from 1994 to 1999.

Other notable former employees of Crédit Lyonnais include occultist Jean Bricaud (1881–1934), union leader Christiane Gilles (1930–2016), politician Henri Guaino (1957–), union leader Gérard Labrune (1943–), scholar Frédéric Lachèvre (1855–1943), politician Arlette Laguiller (1940–), politician Roger Laroque (1910–1985), singer Eddy Mitchell (1942–), family heir Charles Napoléon (1950–), monarchist activist Pierre Pujo (1929–2007), and statesman Lionel Stoléru (1937–2016).

== See also ==
- Comptoir National d'Escompte de Paris
- Société Générale
- Banque Nationale pour le Commerce et l'Industrie
- List of banks in France
