= François Barthélemy Arlès-Dufour =

French silk merchant

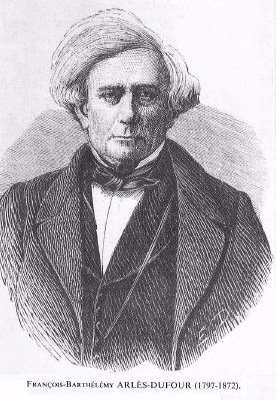
- Born: François Barthélemy Arlès; 3 June 1797; Sète, Hérault, France
- Died: 21 January 1872 (aged 74); Vallauris, Alpes-Maritimes, France
- Occupations: Railway executive, humanist
- Known for: Saint-Simonianism

François Barthélemy Arlès-Dufour (3 June 1797 – 21 January 1872) was a French silk merchant and leading exponent of Saint-Simonianism. He was born to a poor family, had little formal education and began work in a shawl factory at the age of 16. Later he joined a silk company based in Leipzig, Germany, married into the owners' family and was placed in charge of its Lyon operations. Working first for his in-laws and then independently, he made a fortune in silk. Arlès-Dufour also became involved in banking, railways and the Suez canal project. He played an important role in the Lyon Chamber of Commerce, and as a member of the jury in various international expositions. He believed in free trade and in social institutions that would help the most disadvantaged social classes.

== Early years ==
François Barthélemy Arlès was born on 3 June 1797 in Sète, Hérault. His father joined the army as a private soldier and had risen to the rank of battalion commander by the time of the Napoleonic Wars. François received little schooling as a child, but after his father retired gained some education at the Lycée Impérial à Paris. His father died in 1811 and two years later his mother, who was illiterate, was forced to withdraw François Arlès from school due to lack of money. At the age of 16 he became a factory boy at a shawl factory, then a worker and then a foreman. He said later, "I treated my workmen firmly, but with the respect that man owes to man. I placed myself between the servant and the master, not to frustrate the master, but to be useful to both." He added, "I was hungry and I remember it. " He was an enthusiastic supporter of Napoleon, and in 1815 after the emperor returned from exile in Elba, the 18-year-old Arlès volunteered for the army. He arrived too late to fight in the Battle of Waterloo. His employer gave him back his job, and from this time on he became a pacifist.

== Silk merchant ==
In 1816 Arlès made several long sales trips in Germany with a sample of fabrics and shawls. In 1817 he met Prosper Enfantin in Frankfurt, the future leader of Saint-Simonianism. Also that year he visited the silk trading house in Leipzig of Dufour frères, a family that had emigrated from France after the Revocation of the Edict of Nantes. François Arlès tried to teach himself better French, and also learned German and English and studied the new discipline of political economy. In Munich he met Gustave d’Eichtal^{(fr)}, who would become banker of the Saint-Simonian movement. He read the works of Adam Smith, David Ricardo and John Stuart Mill. He became a firm supporter of the sovereignty of the people, and the 1819 Carlsbad Decrees confirmed him in his hostility to kings and priests. In 1820 he talked with Jean-Baptiste Say at the Conservatoire des arts et métiers in Paris. In 1821 Dufour frères offered him employment with their firm.

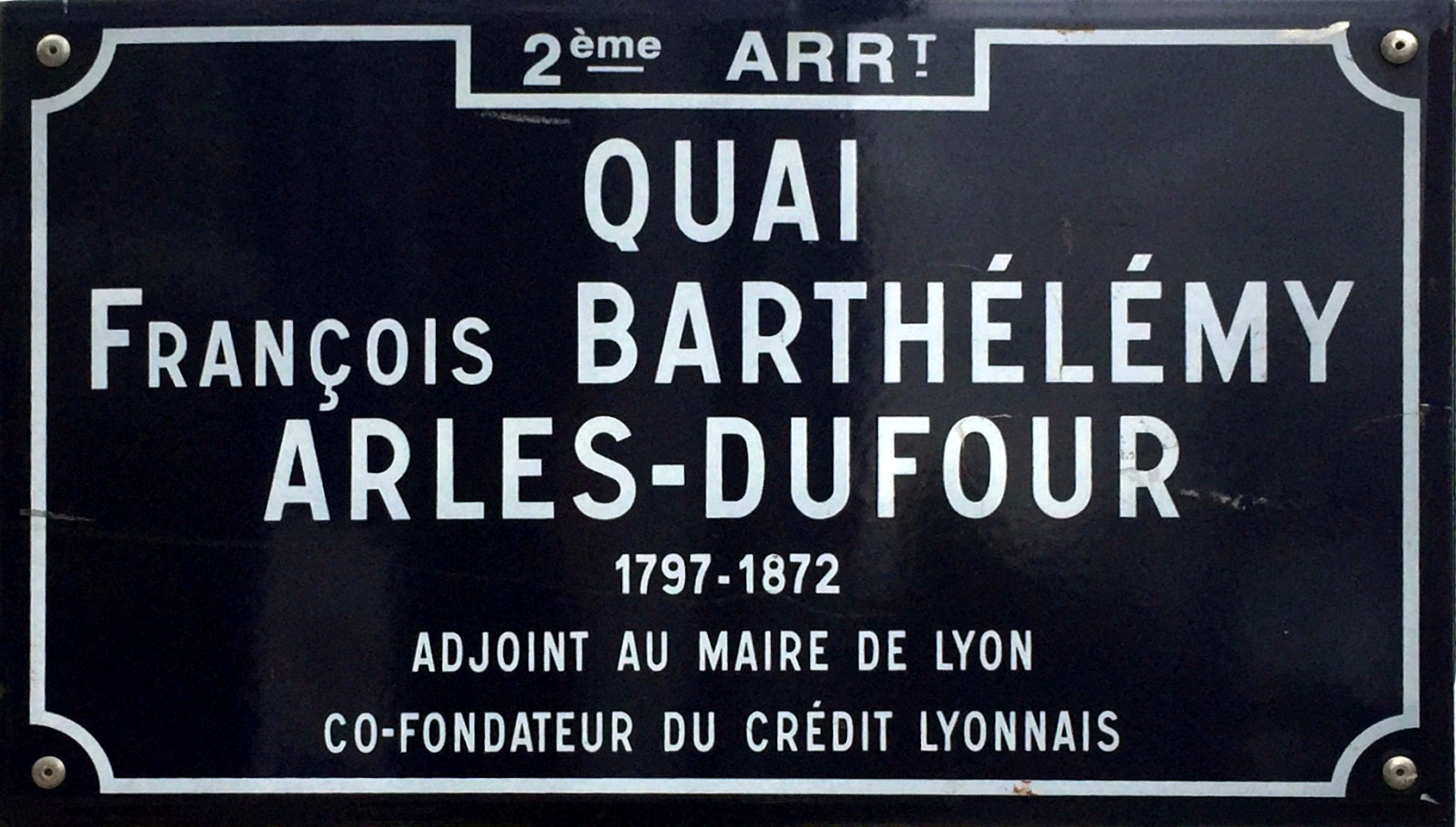
Street sign in Lyon commemorating Arlès-Dufour

In 1824 Arlès married Pauline Dufour, only daughter of one of the Dufour brothers. At the time of his marriage he joined his name to that of his wife to become "Arlès-Dufour". In 1825 he was placed in charge of the important Dufour freres branch in Lyon. This was the start of his prosperous career as a silk merchant. He visited England in 1826 and every year after. There he succeeded in business and also made valuable friendships. John Bowring, a follower of Jeremy Bentham, introduced utilitarianism to him. He became a friend of George Villiers, the future Lord Clarendon, and met George Richardson Porter, in charge of statistics at the Board of Trade. Porter gave him facts that supported his belief in free trade. Bowring visited Lyon in 1832. Arlès-Dufour also established cordial relations with British political and business leaders such as John Bright and Richard Cobden.

During the American recession that followed the Panic of 1837 Arlès-Dufour was almost ruined by customers in America defaulting on their debts to him. He left Lyon for London en route to New York. In London he received financial support from his friend and correspondent William Leaf and did not have to continue his journey. In partial recovery of his debt he received two properties at Kingston and Wilbur in New York State. He liquidated his company honorably. with the help of his international correspondents and Lyon notables, and in 1839 created his own company, Arlès-Dufour. The company opened branches in Zürich, Saint-Étienne, Paris, Basel, Krefeld, Marseille, London and New York City.

The new company had its headquarter in Milan. In 1851 the building holding its offices and warehouse in Milan was destroyed by fire. Arlès-Dufour was trapped in the rubble of the building for a while, but managed to escape with his wallet and account books. However, since some of the silks were not insured he suffered a second financial collapse, but was again able to rebuild his company with credit from his friends. In 1855 Arlès-Dufour hired Natalis Rondot to manage his Paris branch. Rondot helped him make contact with the Scottish firm Jardine Matheson of Hong Kong, a leader in the Far East silk trade. He agreed not to open any silk exchange in the Far East, but to buy from Jardine, Matheson, who would transport it. Arlès-Dufour would then sell through his network in Europe. This verbal contract would be respected for a century. He was concerned by the financial downturn that followed the Panic of 1857, and retired from business in 1859. The company was passed to his two eldest sons and his son in law. He retained a fortune of 2.8 million francs.

== Free trade and Saint-Simonianism ==
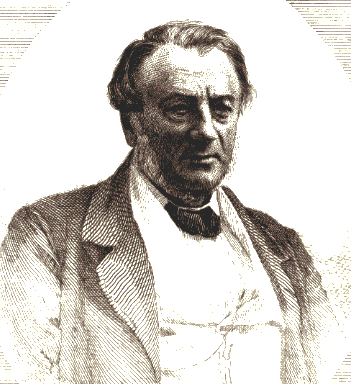
Barthélemy Prosper Enfantin (1796–1864), long-time friend and partner of Arlès-Dufour

As early as 1822 Arlès wrote, "The greatest and most conclusive step, and that which our state of civilization imperiously requires, is the abolition of customs and obstacles, which make communication and exchange between people difficult or impossible." In 1828 he wrote, "Let us abolish these barriers ... multiply our relationships, live as brothers." He believed that freedom of trade must lead to universal peace. In 1828 he published an article in the Lyon paper Le Précurseur in which he spoke in favour of the free export of French silks in return for the free entry of foreign silks, which drew protests from those who felt the Lyon silk industry could not survive without protection. In articles in 1832 and 1833 in L’Écho de la Fabrique Arlès-Dufour wrote on subjects such as industry in Lyon, tariffs, cooperation with England and a progressive income tax.

Arlès-Dufour was sympathetic to the workers, having been one himself, and looked for ways to make their life easier. He soon decided that free competition was the answer. He became a convert to Saint-Simonianism in 1829 and remained faithful to these ideals for the rest of his life. The goal was to hasten social change during the transition to an industrial society following the principle that "All social institutions must aim at improving the moral, intellectual and physical fortunes of the most numerous and poorest classes". Arlès-Dufour was a friend of the Pereires and the Talbots, business leaders who were also Saint-Simonians. He wrote, "Everywhere, the class that has nothing in common but misery is at war with the one that has everything. And who could be surprised at that? Society, that is to say, the men who have, take care of this class only to contain it." However, he was opposed to the demands of workers in Lyon for minimum payments for their work, saying that a manufacturer could not operate at a loss. When the canuts (Lyon silk workers) revolted in November 1831 many observers blamed the Saint-Simonians for the uprising.

Arlès-Dufour believed in free competition, productive work, huge manufacturing enterprises and a strong sense of social solidarity. He contributed to the worker's newspaper L'Echo de la Fabrique, where Enfantin says he "threw in as much Saint-simonianism as possible". In the early days of the French Second Republic in April 1848 he launched an appeal to the workers of La Croix-Rousse saying, "It is almost twenty years since ... I called for an age of association of everyone, rich and the poor, manufacturer and the worker, by organization of labour, classification by vocation and the compensation according to work." In his property at Oullins he planted a lime tree, the "tree of liberty." However, he refused to run for political office.

== Other enterprises ==
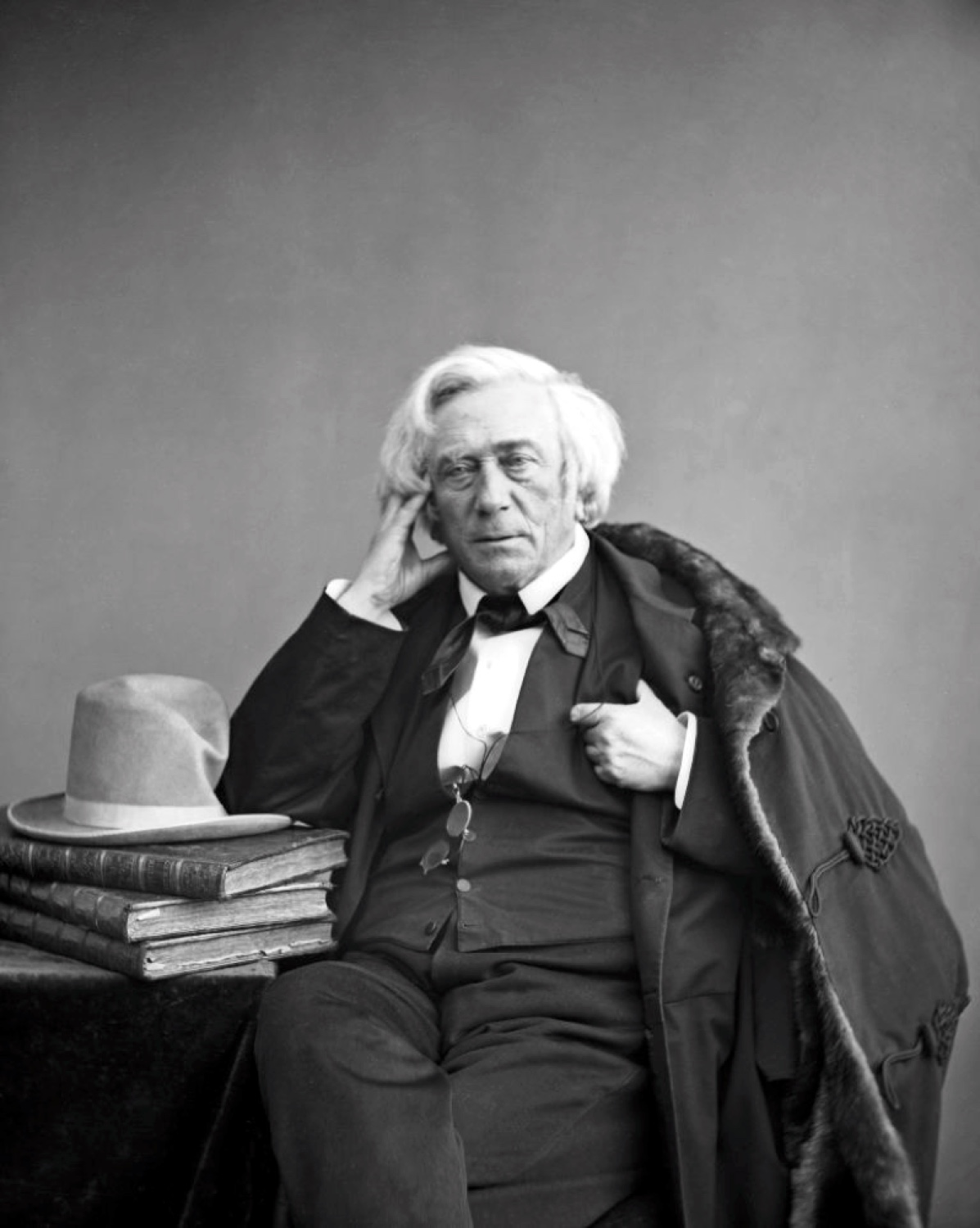
François Barthélemy Arlès-Dufour by Nadar

Arlès-Dufour appears to have been the force behind the creation of the Banque de Lyon in 1835–36. He was a promoter of the Compagnie du chemin de fer de Paris à Lyon^{(fr)} (Paris-Lyon Railway) and the Compagnie du chemin de fer de Lyon à Avignon^{(fr)} (Lyon-Avignon Railway) and was a director of both of these companies. He helped merge them to form the Chemins de fer de Paris à Lyon et à la Méditerranée (PLM: Paris-Lyon-Mediterranean Railway), and seems to have been a director of the PLM.

In 1833 Enfantin led a party of 20 French technicians to Egypt to undertake new surveys and put new life into the Suez Canal and Nile Barrage projects. He met Ferdinand de Lesseps, at the time Vice-Consul for France in Egypt, and was presented to the Khedive Muhammad Ali, who approved the barrage but not the canal. Enfantin stayed in Egypt until 1837 working on the barrage, then returned to France. In his 1834 Un mot sur les fabriques étrangères Arlès-Dufour applauded the Suez Canal project, which would soon bring Paris as close to Calcutta as to Saint Petersburg. In 1844 Enfantin founded the journal L'Algérie, with some funding from Charles Ignace Plichon. Enfantin, with support from Arlès-Dufour, was dreaming of creating a great railway network in France. He planned to also establish maritime commercial links with the Indies through a Suez canal.

In 1846 Enfantin and Arlès-Dufour created the Société d'Études du Canal de Suez, with French, English and German sections. The other French member were Jules, Léon and Paulin Talabot. The English members were Robert Stephenson and Edward Starbuck. The other members were Alois Negrelli of Vienna and Féronce and Sellier of Leipzig, who representedGerman firms. The company had initial capital of 150,000 francs, with its headquarters in Enfantin's house. In effect it was a semi-official enterprise, with strong support from the Muhammed Ali, who paid most of the cost. The plan was set back in 1849 when Muhammed Ali Pasha died and was succeeded by the pro-English Abbas Pasha.

The Suez project was revived in 1854 when Sa'id Pasha came to power in Egypt and heard and approved de Lesseps' proposal in November 1854. Lesseps wrote warm and enthusiastic letters to Arlès-Dufour when his project began to prosper at the end of 1854 and the start of 1855. He also asked him to make contact with the main banking houses in France and Europe and the "great capitalists of England". As a founder, Arlès-Dufour would be rewarded with a share of the profits. Later Lesseps would take full credit for the canal project.

In 1853 Arlès-Dufour and Enfantin founded the Compagnie générale des Eaux in Lyon, and in 1854 founded the Lyon Société des Omnibus. In 1856 he participated in the capital of the Deutsche Credit Anstalt founded by his friends in Leipzig. Arlès-Dufour participated in foundation of the Crédit Industriel et Commercial in 1859. He was the true founder of the Crédit Lyonnais in 1863, with his employee Henri Germain. The Crédit Lyonnais was launched by Germain on 6 July 1863 with an innovative model based on accepting small deposits on which it paid interest, and using the deposits to finance short-term loans. The first shareholders included Arlès-Dufour and other Saint-Simonians such as Paulin Talabot, Enfantin and Michel Chevalier, a close advisor to Napoleon III. There were 140 initial depositors, growing to 10,000 by its second year. The bank made an agreement with the new HSBC bank founded by a nephew of Jardine. When Enfantin died in 1864 he left all his property to Arlès-Dufour.

== Public activities ==
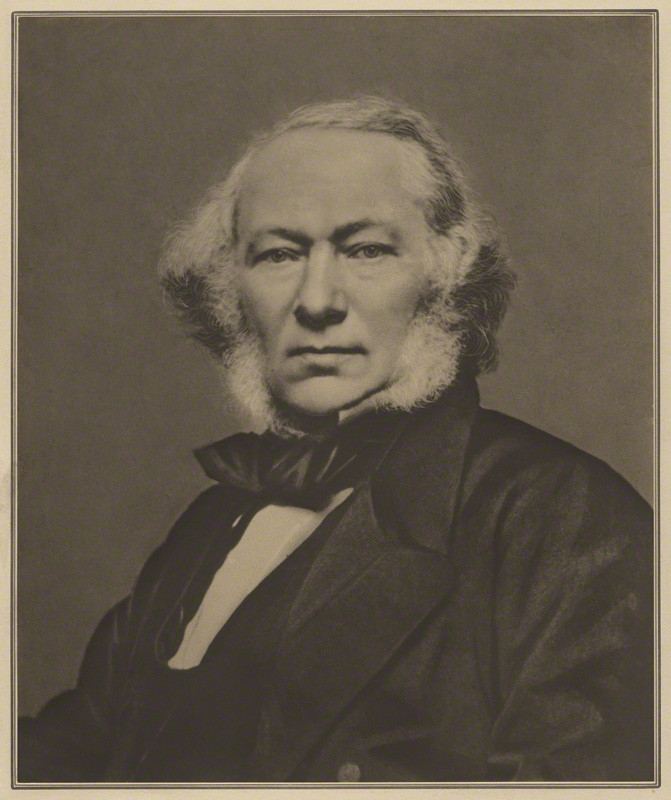
Richard Cobden praised Arlès-Dufour for his efforts in achieving free trade between France and Britain.

Arlès-Dufour was hostile to the monarchy of the Bourbon Restoration, and during the July Revolution of 1830 served in the National Guard and was temporarily deputy mayor. He was a municipal councilor of La Guillotière, a district of Lyon, in 1855, and general councilor of the Rhône department. Arlès-Dufour was elected to the Lyon Chamber of Commerce in 1832, and remained a member for almost 36 years. He exerted a strong liberal influence, and gained a considerable reputation for his frank statements about the policies of successive governments. He supported Bowring in his efforts to reduce tariffs in 1834, but they faced strong opposition from the winegrowers and the Lyon Chamber of Commerce refused to give support.

As a member of the Lyon Chamber of Commerce, Arlès-Dufour organized an exhibition of foreign silk factories in Lyon in 1834 so local producers could compare their goods to those of their main foreign competitors. Arlès-Dufour was a member of the jury at the Exposition des produits de l'industrie française in Paris in 1844 and 1849. He attended The Great Exhibition in 1851 in London as a member of the jury. He was secretary-general of the imperial commission for the 1855 Paris Exposition Universelle. He was again a member of the international jury at the 1862 International Exhibition in London and the 1867 Exposition Universelle in Paris.

During the 1851 exposition Arlès-Dufour discussed establishment of a free trade agreement with his friend Cobden, and this led to cooperation between Cobden's party and the French Association for Free Trade. However, there remained strong opposition to free trade in France, and it was not until 1860 that the Emperor imposed a treaty of commerce with England by a "customs coup". Arlès-Dufour's struggle for free trade was finally vindicated with the 1860 Cobden–Chevalier Treaty for free trade between Britain and France. Richard Cobden, who signed the treaty on behalf of Britain, wrote a personal note to him thanking him for the role he had played in the conclusion of the agreement. In August 1860 Napoleon III visited Lyon, where he made Arlès a Commander of the Legion of Honour.

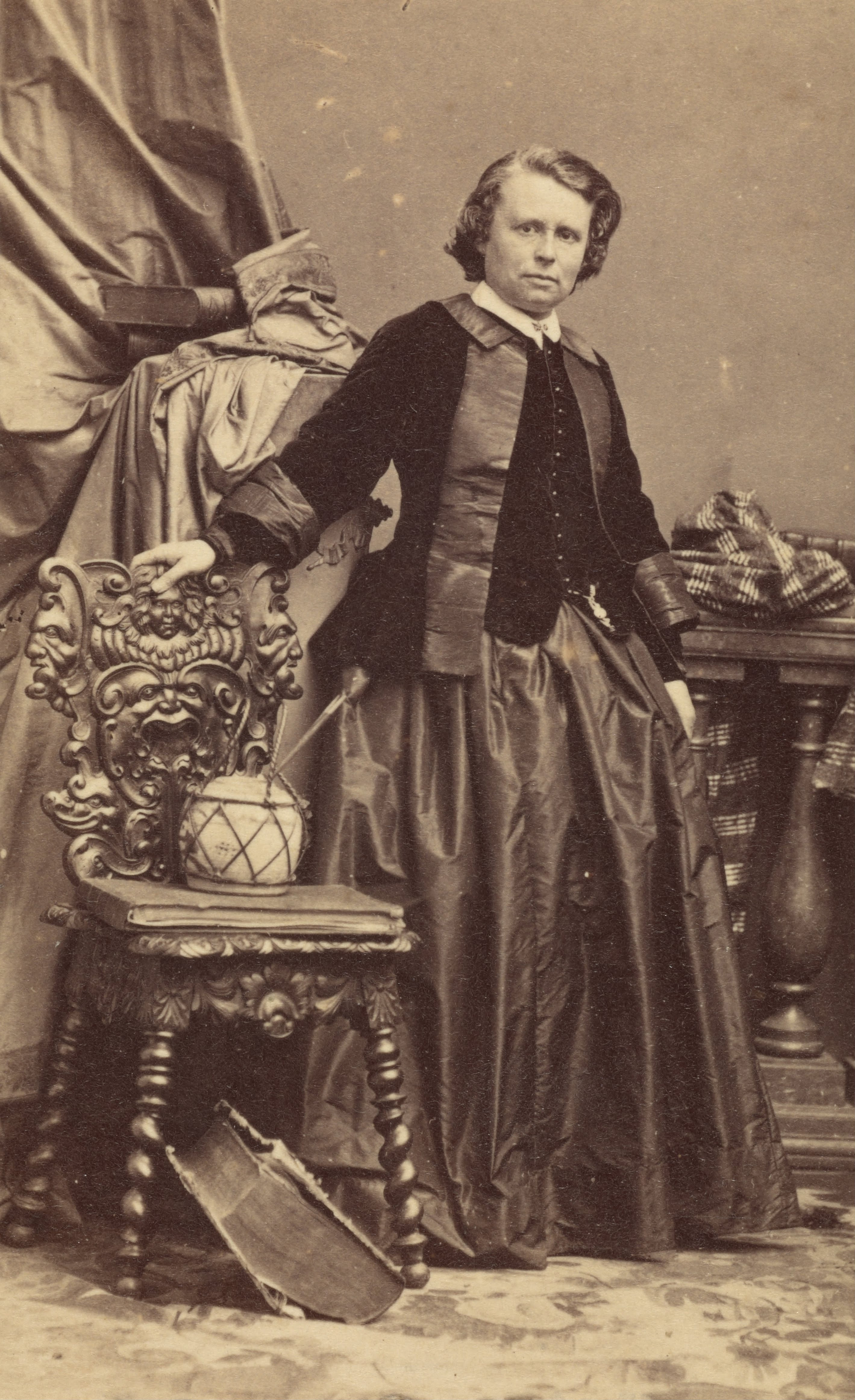
Rosa Bonheur. Arlès-Dufour helped obtain the award of the Legion of Honour for her.

Arlès-Dufour gave his support to Julie-Victoire Daubié in her efforts to become the first woman to obtain a Bachelor's degree in France. He was one of the adjudicators in 1859 for a prize that Daubié won for her essay La Femme pauvre au XIX siècle (Women and Poverty in the Nineteenth Century). He and Daubié founded the Association pour l’émancipation progressive de la femme. He persuaded the Empress Eugénie to award the Legion of Honour to the painter Rosa Bonheur.

Arlès-Dufour was involved in various charitable organizations including the Comité auxiliaire de bienfaisance (from 1829), the Caisse de prêts des chefs d'atelier de soierie and the Société de Secours mutuels des ouvriers en soie. He was a strong believer in the right of poor people to education. He founded the Société d’Instruction primaire du Rhône in 1828, and was this society's secretary general until his death. Arlès-Dufour and Désiré Girardon, professor at the Martinière college, founded the École Centrale lyonnaise pour l'Industrie et le Commerce in 1857. The purpose was to train the best students of the Martinière School in chemistry, industrial mechanics, civil construction and industrial design. The school, today the École centrale de Lyon, opened on 3 November 1857 with 14 students. In 1864 Arlès-Dufour founded the Société d'enseignement professionnel du Rhône^{(fr)}. He also founded a public library, a free primary school and a free secondary school in the Lyon suburb of Oullins. On 30 November 1867 Arlès-Dufour. Émile de Girardin and Frédéric Passy founded the International and Permanent League for Peace. In 1868 he created a homeopathic dispensary in Lyon.

== Death and legacy ==
François Barthélemy Arlès-Dufour died on 21 January 1872, in Vallauris, Alpes-Maritimes. In his obituary the Journal de Lyon wrote, "He made his life into two parts, one was industry and the other was humanity". Michel Chevalier said of him that few French people were so well known abroad. He had received decorations from Austria, Bavaria, Denmark, Prussia, Sardinia, Saxony, Sweden and Tuscany. He was a Commander of the Legion of Honour and a member of the L’Académie des Sciences, Belles-Lettres et Arts de Lyon. His firm lasted until 2013, called in turn Chabrières-Morel from 1885, then Morel-Journel & Cie from 1930.

== Publications ==
Publications included:

- Barthélémy-François Arlès-Dufour (1834), Un mot sur les fabriques étrangères de soieries, à propos de l'exposition de leurs produits faite par la Chambre de commerce de Lyon..., Lyon, Paris: Mme S. Durval, Bohaire, p. 154
- Barthélémy-François Arlès-Dufour (1842), "Importance de l'industrie des soies et soieries", Revue du Lyonnais, Lyon: Impr. de L. Boitel
- Barthélémy-François Arlès-Dufour (1862), Exposition universelle de 1862. Considérations générales sur les soies, les soieries et les rubans (Extrait des Rapports du jury international de l'Exposition de Londres de 1862), Paris: impr. de N. Chaix / Exposition internationale 1862; London
- Barthélémy-François Arlès-Dufour (1865), A la famille Saint-Simonienne (Sur la mort du P. Enfantin), Paris: impr. de Dubuisson, p. 3
- Barthélémy-François Arlès-Dufour; Arthur Enfantin; Henri Fournel; Adolphe Guéroult; Paul-Mathieu Laurent (1868), Réponse à M. Dupanloup,... sur sa lettre à un cardinal dénonçant les écoles professionnelles de filles, la Ligue de l'enseignement, les cours publics autorisés, le matérialisme et l'école de médecine de Paris, les francs-maçons, les positivistes, les saint-simoniens, etc., etc., Paris: E. Dentu, p. 32
- Barthélémy-François Arlès-Dufour (1993), Arlès-Dufour, un Saint-Simonien à Lyon (Selected letters from Arlès-Dufour to Enfantin), Lyon: Éd. lyonnaises d'art et d'histoire, p. 188

== Sources ==
- Barthélémy-François Arlès-Dufour (1797-1872) - Auteur du texte (in French), BnF: Bibliotheque nationale de France
- Canton-Debat, Jacques (2000), François Barthélemy Arlès-Dufour, Société des études saint-simoniennes, archived from the original on 2012-04-24
- Emerit, Marcel (1974), "Du saint-simonisme au catholicisme : Ignace Plichon, député du Nord", Revue du Nord (in French), 56 (220): 29–42, doi:10.3406/rnord.1974.3210
- "François Barthélemy Arlès-Dufour", AGDE-INFOS - le Quotidien du Pays Agathois, du Piscénois et de l'ensemble des communes de l'agglomération Hérault-Méditerranée. (in French)
- Histoire (in French), École centrale de Lyon
- Karabell, Zachary (2009-08-26), Parting the Desert: The Creation of the Suez Canal, Knopf Doubleday Publishing Group, ISBN 978-0-307-56607-2
- McQueen, Alison (2017-07-05), Empress Eug?e and the Arts: Politics and Visual Culture in the Nineteenth Century, Taylor & Francis, ISBN 978-1-351-56832-6
- Thermeau, Gérard-Michel (25 October 2015), "Arlès-Dufour : le marchand de soie saint-simonien", Contrepoints (in French)
- Todd, David (2015-04-30), Free Trade and its Enemies in France, 1814–1851, Cambridge University Press, ISBN 978-1-107-03693-2
- Vaslin, Jacques-Marie (16 August 2013), "Henri Germain, prudent banquier du Crédit lyonnais", Le Monde (in French)
- Wilson, Arnold T. (1939), The Suez Canal : Its Past, Present, and Future, London, New York, Toronto: Oxford University Press
