= Gérard Labrune =

French syndicalist (born 1943)

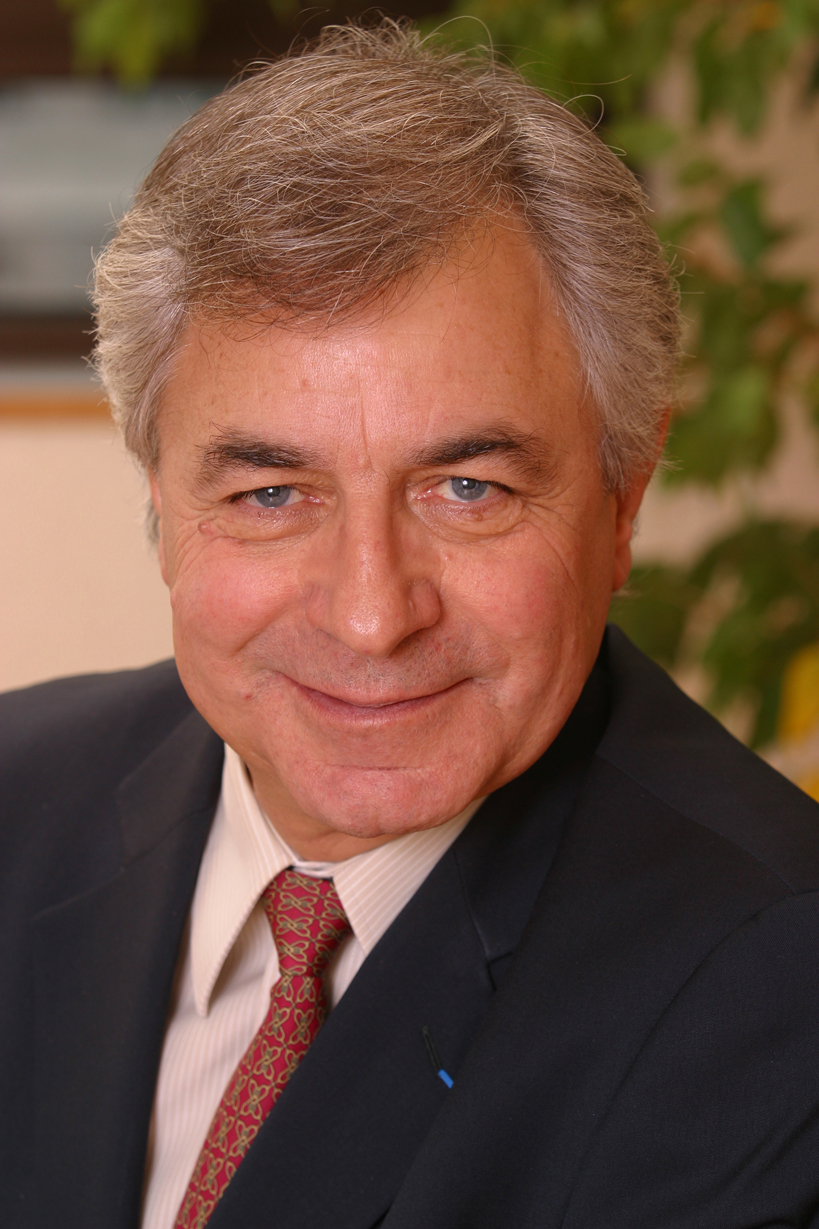
Gérard Labrune secretary general CFE-CGU

Gérard Labrune (born 2 September 1943 in Vatan, Indre, France) is a French syndicalist

== Biography ==
Labrune spent his entire professional career at Crédit lyonnais and joined the syndicalist movement at the age of 50.

In 1999, he became the national president of the SNB and president of the National Federation of Credit Institutions' Union (fédération nationale des syndicats des établissements de crédit, FNSEC), and president of the National Federation of Finance and Banking (fédération nationale de la finance et de la banque).

He was elected secretary general of the CFE-CGC in December 2006.

He is a member of the French Economic, Social and Environmental Council and is on the board of directors of AGIRC.
