= Henri Germain =

French banker and politician (1824–1905)

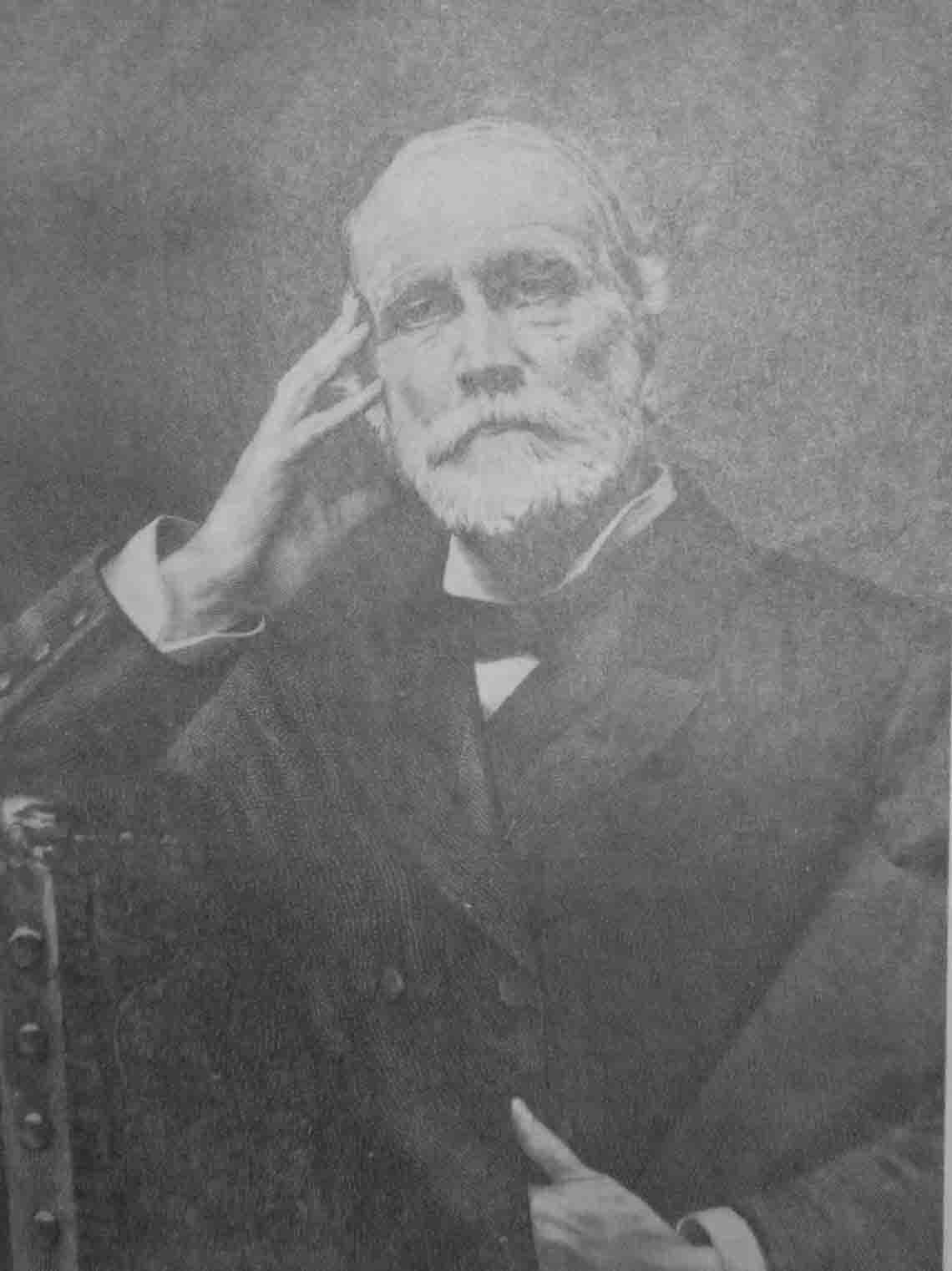
- Born: 19 February 1824; Lyon, France
- Died: 2 February 1905 (aged 80)
- Occupation: Banker
- Spouse: Blanche Germain
- Children: André Germain
- Parent(s): Henri Germain; Claudine Lupin

Henri Germain (February 19, 1824 – February 2, 1905) was a French banker and politician who founded Crédit Lyonnais.

== Early life ==
Henri Germain was born on 19 February 1824 in Lyon. His father, Henri Germain, was a silk businessman, and his mother was Claudine Lupin. He received a law degree. He was a follower of Saint-Simonianism, and François Barthélemy Arlès-Dufour (1797-1872) became his mentor.

== Career ==
Germain founded Crédit Lyonnais on 6 July 1863. It became the first bank in France to offer savings accounts with interest. The first shareholders were Saint-Simon followers like Paulin Talabot (1799–1885), Barthélemy Prosper Enfantin (1796–1864), Arlès-Dufour, and Michel Chevalier (1806-1879). Two years later, in 1865, he founded the Société Foncière Lyonnaise, a real estate company. In 1892, he spearheaded the construction of the Boulevard Carnot, then known as the Boulevard de la Foncière-Lyonnaise.

Germain was a member of the General Council of Ain from 1871 to 1883. He then served as a member of the National Assembly from 1868 to 1893.

== Personal life and death ==
Germain was married to Blanche Germain. They resided at Villa Orangini in Cimiez, Nice. Their son, André Germain (1881-1971), was a writer.

Germain died on 2 February 1905.

== Bibliography ==
- La Situation financière de la France en 1886
- L’État politique de la France en 1886
