= Jean Peyrelevade =

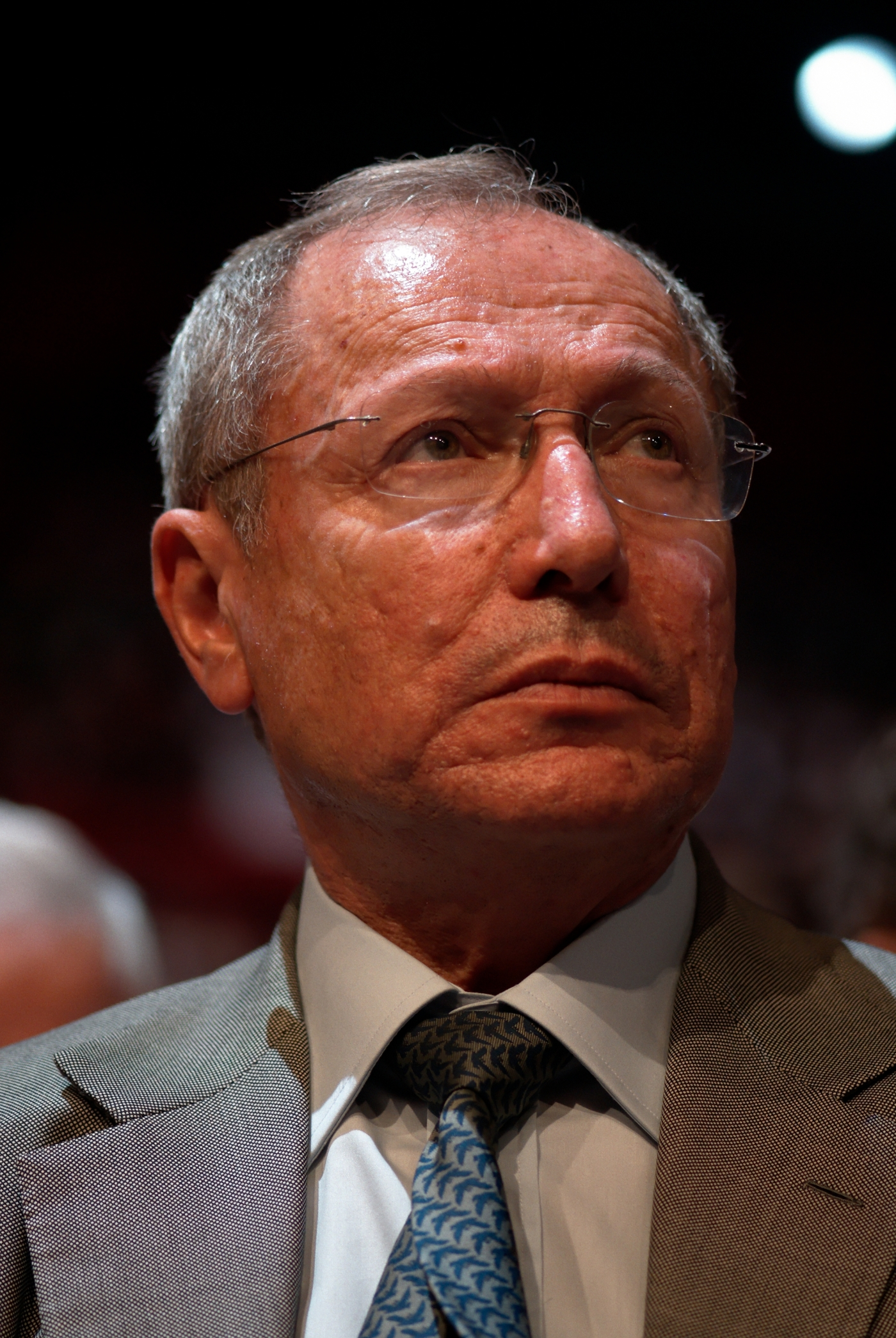
- Peyrelevade at the François Bayrou meeting at the Palais Omnisports de Paris-Bercy 18 April 2007
- Born: 24 October 1939 (age 86); Marseille, France
- Citizenship: French
- Education: Aerospace engineer
- Alma mater: École polytechnique École nationale de l'aviation civile University of Paris-Sorbonne; Institut d'Études Politiques de Paris
- Occupation: Civil servant
- Known for: French politician
- Political party: Democratic Movement
- Website: peyrelevade.blog.lemonde.fr

Jean Peyrelevade (born 24 October 1939) is a senior French center-left politician and business leader.

== Beliefs and political career ==
In 1981 Peyrelevade was appointed deputy director of the cabinet and economic adviser to French Prime Minister Pierre Mauroy, and, while professing scepticism about its extent, oversaw the public sector.

He was previously a teacher of economics at the École Polytechnique, and has written on the evolution of contemporary capitalism, particularly in his 2005 book Le capitalisme total, published by the La République des idées think tank. In the book he criticises exaggerated forms of capitalism, and proposes a ban on stock options as part of executive compensation, thereby avoiding conflict of interest, and a lowering of dividends to shareholders to limit speculation.

He supported Francois Bayrou in the 2007 French presidential election, and joined Bayrou's campaign team with a view to influence its economic programme.

In the 2008 French municipal elections Peyrelevade led the Democratic Movement party (MoDem) list in the 16th arrondissement of Paris – he polled 8.64% of votes in the first round, ranking fourth after the lists of Claude Goasguen (UMP), 51.71%; Jean-Yves Mano (PS), 17.08%; and David Alphand (Miscellaneous right), 13.22%. He was elected through the list and became a borough councilor, and on 13 June 2008 was appointed a vice president of MoDem. He resigned from the board of the 16th arrondissement, and all positions within MoDem, on 6 January 2009. He no longer has partisan ties but is an active participant of the left-leaning Terra Nova think tank.

In an opinion published in Le Figaro in 2009, he advocated a separation between deposit and investment banks – believing banks to be a true public service which should be managed as such – and a regulation of the financial system to prevent further financial crises.

On 7 September 2011 Peyrelevade supported the candidacy of François Hollande in the 2011 Socialist Party presidential primary. However, during the 17 September 2011 MoDem summer conference, and in radio interviews, he said he would support Manuel Valls in the first round of voting, and probably Francois Hollande in the second. On 5 January 2012 he stated that he had changed his mind in his support for François Hollande, saying candidate "Bayrou's speech is more consistent, clearer".

In 2012 Peyrelevade stated that France needed a period of wage moderation to re-vitalize the economy. He believes that the 35-hour working week introduced by President Lionel Jospin in 2000 was destructive of French competitiveness within the Eurozone, while "Germans were seriously putting their affairs in order". Although he saw improvements during the Premiership of Édouard Balladur (1993–95) and Dominique de Villepin (2005-07), he feels that not enough progress was made in lowering taxes to boost demand. Nicolas Sarkozy, he felt, had "all the time to address these issues" but didn't. Peyrelevade promotes re-industrialisation, innovation, increased spending on research and promotion of private enterprise. He believes that French employment law keeps wages high relative to other countries, discouraging employment at a time of unemployment. He sees the high cost of social protection as an economic burden, and would reduce these costs while lowering taxes on households. Although Peyrelevade had personal sympathy for 2012 President François Hollande, he was sceptical of his dialogue with the French Green party who advocate a 32-hour working week with a refusal to contemplate austerity and high productivity.

== Corporate career ==
While being associated with left-wing governments Peyrelevade was considered competent by the business community, and was appointed and confirmed head of large state-controlled companies: Chairman of the Suez Company from 1983 to 1986; Stern Bank from 1986 to 1988; the Union des assurances de Paris from 1988 to 1993; and Credit Lyonnais from 1993 to 2003.

In 1985, on behalf of the French authorities, Peyrelevade was responsible for negotiating agreement on the establishment of Disneyland Paris.

Peyrelevade became chairman of the French Government-controlled bank Crédit Lyonnais in 1993. Previously, in 1991, the bank had acquired the then insolvent and now-defunct Californian insurance company Executive Life. Banks in the US at the time were legally barred from buying insurers. In 2006 the bank and Peyrelevade were charged in the federal court of Los Angeles with two felonies concerning false statements to the Federal Reserve. For failing to alert the authorities of the acquisition, Peyrelevade, through a plea bargain with the court, was banned from entering the US for three years and fined $500,000.

Peyrelevade joined the European investment bank Leonardo & Co. in 2004, and is now the bank's chairman of the board, and president of Leonardo Midcap Cf. He is a director of other French and European leading companies, including Bouygues, DNCA Finance, and BG Bonnard & Gardel Holding SA, and is a member of the supervisory board of KLM.

Jean Peyrelevade is a member of the think tank Le Siècle.

== Education ==
- 1958 – École polytechnique
- 1961 – École nationale de l'aviation civile
- 1963 – University of Paris-Sorbonne
- 1963 – Institut d'études politiques de Paris

== Bibliography ==
- Pour un capitalisme intelligent, ed. Grasset, 1993
- La république silencieuse, (with Denis Jeambar), ed. Plon, 2002
- Le capitalisme total, ed. Seuil, 2005, ISBN 978-2020829328
- Seul face à la justice américaine, ed. Plon, 2007
- Sarkozy : l'erreur historique, ed. Plon, 2008
- France, état critique, ed. Plon, 2011
