= Natalis Rondot =

French economist and historian (1821–1900)

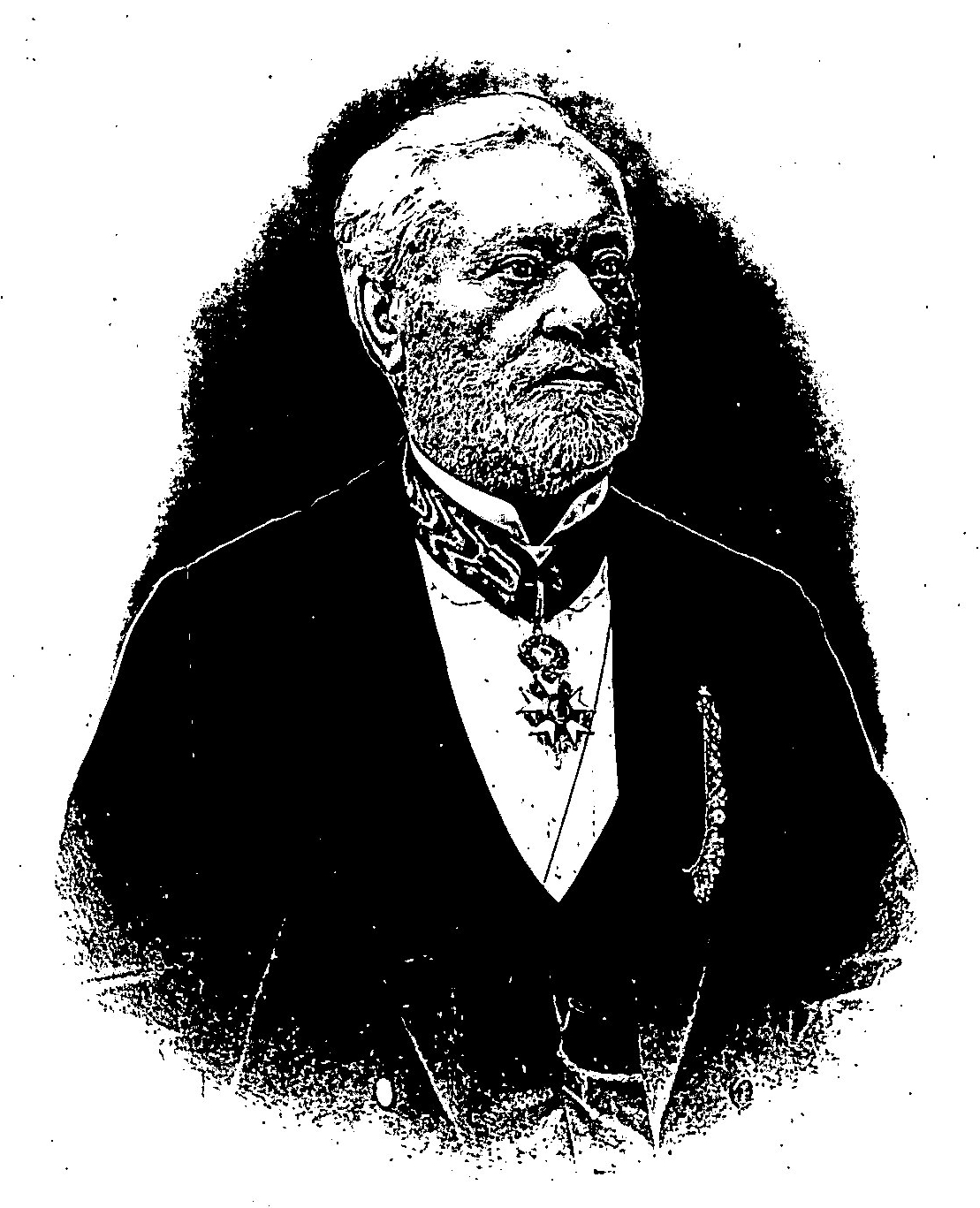
Image of Natalis Rondot

Cyr-François-Natalis Rondot (English: /rɒnˈdoʊ/ ron-DOH, French: [natalis ʁɔ̃do]; 23 March 1821 – 26 August 1900) was a French economist, art historian and numismatist. He was in charge of several official missions abroad, especially to Asia and Africa. He studied art and artists from the twelfth to the seventeenth century, including painters, glass painters, engravers, goldsmiths, medallists, ceramicists, bookbinders, and printers.

== Biography ==
The son of Cyr Rondot, a fabric merchant and then administrator at the Banque de France, Natalis Rondot attended university in Paris, then began an industrial career in Reims. In 1843, the Chamber of Commerce of Reims sent him as a delegate on a mission to negotiate trade treaties in China, and subsequently in India, Indochina, Malaysia and Africa. The mission lasted nearly three years. On his return, aged 25, he was made Knight of the Legion of Honour. In 1847, he carried out a mission for the wool industry in Russia and Belgium. Rondot was a representative of the Lyon Chamber of Commerce in Paris for 30 years.

Rondot actively contributed to the development of the silk industry in Lyon in the 1850s. He first worked with the firm of Desgrand father and son and in 1854 married Sophie Bizot, sister of Paul Desgrand's son-in-law. Rondot considered himself underpaid, and left the Desgrand company for rival companies, participating in the development of other firms in Lyon.

Rondot participated in the Universal Exhibition in London (1851), Paris (1855, 1867, 1878, 1889) and Vienna (1873). In 1864, he inaugurated the Musée d'Art et d'Industrie de Lyon, which later became the Musée des Tissus et des Arts décoratifs.

After his career as an industrialist, in 1869 he devoted himself to the study of art and artists, and wrote many books, articles and notices. He was a corresponding member of the Académie des Beaux-Arts, of the Academic Society of Sciences, Arts, Belles-Lettres, Agriculture and Industry of Saint-Quentin, of the Committee of Historical and Scientific Works, Commander of the Legion of Honor, and president of a Jury at the Universal Exhibition of Paris in 1889.

== Publications ==
- Étude pratique des tissus de laine convenables pour la Chine, le Japon, la Cochinchine et l'Archipel indien (1845)
- Notice sur les Yang de Chine et sur le métier à tisser le jông et le hŏ (1847)
- Monnaies ou moyens d'échanges en usage dans l'Archipel de Soulou, Malaisie (1848)
- Valeurs officielles. France. Belgique. Angleterre (1849)
- Histoire et statistique des théâtres de Paris (1852)
- Objets de parure, de fantaisie et de goût (1855)
- Les Valeurs de douane officielles et actuelles en France, en Angleterre et en Belgique (1858)
- Notice du vert de Chine et de la teinture en vert chez les chinois (1858)
- Musée d'art et d'industrie (1859)
- Le titrage de la soie (1859)
- Le Commerce et l'Industrie de la Soie (1863)
- Généalogie des Rondot de Troyes (1864)
- L'enseignement nécessaire à l'industrie de la soie: écoles et musées (1877)
- Les graveurs du nom de Mouterde et le monnayage du métal de cloche pur a Lyon (1880)
- Les Artistes et les maîtres de métier de Lyon au XIVe siècle (1882)
- Jean Marende et la médaille de Philibert le Beau et de Marguerite d'Autriche (1883)
- Les sculpteurs de Lyon, du quatorzième au dix-huitième siècle (1884)
- La médaille d'Anne de Bretagne et ses auteurs Louis Lepère, Nicolas de Florence et Jean Lepère. 1494 (1885)
- Saint-Jean, le peintre de fleurs aux expositions universelles en 1851 et en 1855 (1885)
- Jacob Richier, sculpteur et médailleur (1608-1641) (1885)
- L'art de la soie: Les soies, Volume 2 (1887)
- Les sculpteurs de Troyes au XIVe et au XVe siècle [archive] (1887)
- Essai sur les propriétés physiques de la soie (1887)
- Nicolas Bidau, sculpteur et médailleur à Lyon (1622-1692) (1887)
- Jacques Gauvain, orfèvre, graveur et médailleur à Lyon, au XVIe siècle (1887)
- Lalyame, Hendricy et Mimerel, sculpteurs et médailleurs à Lyon, au XVIIe siècle (1888)
- Les orfèvres de Lyon du XIVe au XVIIIe siècle (1888) [archive]
- Les peintres de Lyon du XIVe au XVIIIe siècle, Paris, Typographie E. Plon, Nourrit et Cie, 1888 (lire en ligne) [archive]
- Jacques Morel: sculpteur lyonnais, 1417-1459 (1889)
- L'art du bois à Lyon au quinzième et au seizième siècle (1889)
- Les Maîtres particuliers de la monnaie de Lyon (1889)
- La céramique lyonnaise du quatorzième au dix-huitième siècle (1889)
- La Monnaie de Vimy ou de Neuville, dans le Lyonnais (1890)
- Les Protestants à Lyon au XVIIe siècle (1891)
- Les potiers de terre italiens à Lyon au seizième siècle [archive] (1892)
- Jéronyme Henry, orfèvre et médailleur à Lyon (1503-1538) (1892)
- Les Orfèvres de Troyes du XIIe au XVIIIe siècle (1892)
- Cartes d'adresse et étiquettes: à Lyon au XVIIe et au XVIIIe siècle (1894)
- Le Diamètre des médailles coulées (1895)
- Les Faïenciers italiens à Lyon au XVIe siècle (1895)
- Les graveurs d'estampes sur cuivre à Lyon, au XVII siècle (1896)
- Les relieurs de livres à Lyon du XIVe au XVIIe siècle (1896)
- Les graveurs sur bois et les imprimeurs à Lyon au XVe siècle (1896)
- L'Ancien régime du travail à Lyon (du XIVe au XVIIe siècle) (1897)
- Graveurs sur bois à Lyon au seizième siècle [archive] (1897)
- Bernard Salomon: peintre et tailleur d'histoire à Lyon, au XVIe siècle (1897)
- Les Thurneysen, graveurs d'estampes lyonnais au XVIIe siècle (1899)
- Peintres de Lyon: un peintre lyonnais Claude Guinet de la fin du XVe siècle, Bernoux et Cumin, (1900)
- Pierre Eskrich, peintre et tailleur d'histoires à Lyon au XVIe siècle (1901)
- L'art et les artistes à Lyon du XIVe au XVIIIe siècle [archive] (1902)
- Excursion en Champagne, 1839 (1903)
- Les médailleurs et les graveurs de monnaies: jetons et médailles en France [archive] (1904)

== Sources ==
This record is adapted from the French Wikipedia page for Natalis Rondot.

- Henriette Pommier, “Rondot, Natalis [archive]”, Dictionnaire critique des historiens d'art, Institut national d'histoire de l'art, 22 Sept 2009. Accessed 26 Dec 2013.
- Léon Galle, Natalis Rondot, sa vie et ses travaux, Lyon, Bernoux, Cumin et Masson, 1902, 78 p. (read online [archive])
- Charles Coquelin and Gilbert-Urbain Guillaumin, Dictionnaire de l'économie politique, Volume 2, 1834.
- Gérard Fontaines, La culture du voyage à Lyon de 1820 à 1930, 2003.
- François Pouillon, Dictionnaire des orientalistes de langue française, 2008.
- Jean-François Klein, Soyeux en mer de Chine. Stratégies des réseaux lyonnais en Extrême-Orient (1843-1906), Thèse d'Histoire contemporaine, typescript, under the direction of Claude Prudhomme, Université Lyon-2, 2002.
- Jean-François Klein, “Natalis Rondot (1821-1900). Un ‘technologue’ libéral de la laine au service des Soyeux”, in René Favier, Gérard Gayot, Jean-François Klein, Didier Terrier et Denis Woronoff (eds), Tisser l’Histoire. Entrepreneurs et usines textiles, XVIIIe – XIXe siècles. Mélanges offerts à Serge Chassagne, Valenciennes, Presses Universitaires de Valenciennes, 2009, pp. 207–220.
- Henri Jadart, Preface to Excursion en Champagne, 1903.
