= LCL S.A. =

French financial services company

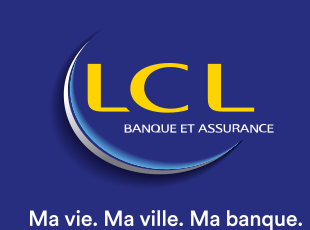
- Company type: Subsidiary
- Industry: Financial services
- Predecessor: Crédit Lyonnais
- Founded: 2005
- Products: Retail, corporate and investment banking; asset management
- Revenue: €3.43 billion (2018)
- Net income: ▲€584 million (2018)
- Number of employees: 20,900 (2013)
- Parent: Crédit Agricole
- Website: www.lcl.com

LCL S.A. is a major French banking network that is part of the Crédit Agricole group, with registered office in Lyon and administrative head office in Paris, France. It was established in 2005 from its predecessor the Crédit Lyonnais, and its name LCL refers to "Le Crédit Lyonnais". As of 2005, it served about 6 million customers in 2000 branches in France.

== History ==
In June 2016, Michel Mathieu took over the direction of LCL, succeeding Yves Nanquette.

== Sponsorship ==
LCL sponsors the yellow jersey, worn by the race leader of the Tour de France cycling race. It awards a plush toy lion –le lion en peluche– to each day's winner as a play on its name. Crédit Lyonnais, the predecessor of LCL, first sponsored the Tour in 1981, and has sponsored the yellow jersey since 1987.

== Controversy ==
In 2010, the French government's Autorité de la concurrence (the department in charge of regulating competition) fined eleven French banks, including LCL S.A., the sum of 384,900,000 euros for colluding to charge unjustified fees on check processing, especially for extra fees charged during the transition from paper check transfer to "Exchanges Check-Image" electronic transfer.

== See also ==
- Crédit Agricole
- Crédit Lyonnais
