= Christiane Gilles =

French trade unionist

Christiane Gilles (1 April 1930 Vincennes, France – 29 October 2016 Chécy, France) was a French trade unionist. She was a member of the Confederal Bureau of the General Confederation of Labour from 1969 until 1981.
