= Women in politics in France =

Role of women in French politics

The place of women in politics in France has evolved over the centuries. While in the Middle Ages, many of them had access to certain important functions and exercised power, their status changed under the Ancien Régime. The laws surrounding the succession of the children of Philip IV condemned women, de jure and de facto, to a non-political role. A phase of emancipation then emerged. It ranged from the first claims of the Revolution with Olympe de Gouges and Anne-Josèphe Théroigne de Méricourt, to those of the feminists of the late 19th and early 20th centuries such as Louise Weiss, up to a more modern form, like Simone de Beauvoir or Françoise Giroud, in a France still plagued by inequalities. The word "feminism" itself, wrongly attributed to Charles Fourier by Louis-Devance (who does not cite his source), was coined by a French doctor named Ferdinand Valère Faneau de la Cour, in a medical work dating from 1871 entitled Du féminisme et de l'infantilisme chez les tuberculeux, but the first political activist to use it regularly was Hubertine Auclert, in 1882.

== Middle Ages ==
In the Middle Ages, married women had advanced rights and played an important role. They could thus inherit lands, manage fiefs when their husbands were absent, and seize courts. The jurist Philippe de Beaumanoir noted that "Ladies should not be left without a dower". Christine de Pizan, in Le Livre des trois vertus wrote:

Because knights, squires, and gentlemen go on journeys and follow wars, it is fitting for wives to be wise and of great governance and to see clearly in all that they do

In 1401, she also attacked the hatred of women present, in the book Roman de la Rose (13th century). Women like Delphine de Sabran in Provence or Gabrielle de la Trémoille (who managed the accounts of her lands and organized the defense of the Île de Noirmoutier) thus governed truly. Women generally inherited fiefs by virtue of specific clauses in their marriage contract, or if they had no descendants; thus, Eleanor of Aquitaine was duchess before her marriage to Louis VII and retained the duchy of Aquitaine during her remarriage to Henry II of England. One can also mention Ermengarde of Narbonne or Anne of Brittany. William the Conqueror allowed his wife, Matilda of Flanders, to have responsibility during his absences (either in France or in England).

Until the 9th century, marriage was a matter of private law. It was under the impetus of Louis the Pious (king from 814 to 840) that Frankish monarchs converted to monogamy, out of religious concern and to oppose the customs of the Barbarians. In the 11th century, the Gregorian reform put an end to clerical marriage.

=== Salic Law ===
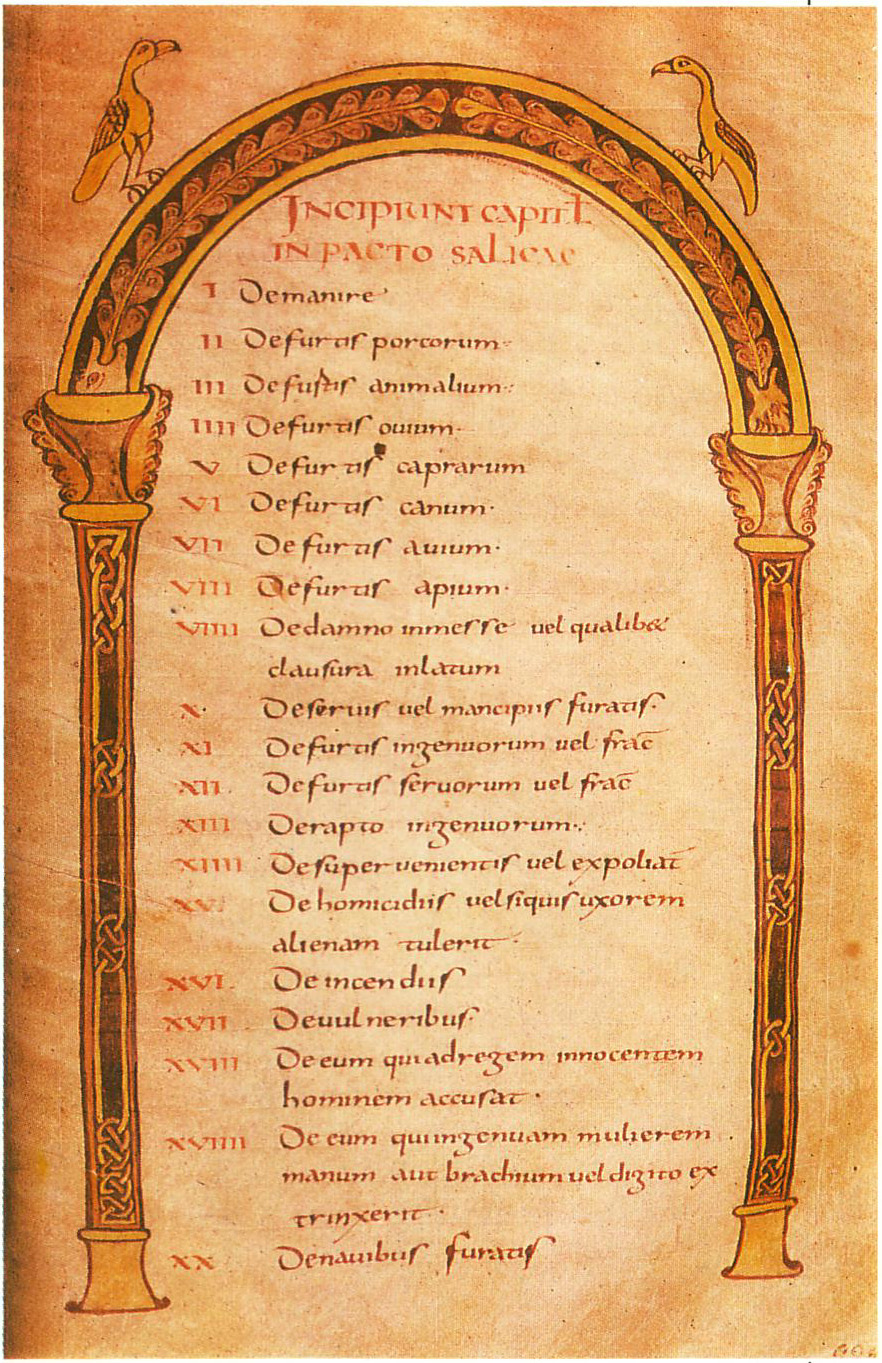
Manuscript copy on vellum from the 8th century of the Salic law. Paris, National Library of France.

It was political motives, more than criticisms against women, that led the great nobles of the Kingdom of France to exclude women from the throne, and gave rise to the expression "the throne must not fall from lance to distaff." The succession of Philip IV the Fair, who died in 1314, was chaotic: Louis X reigned only two years and had no male heir. Since the time of Hugh Capet, the succession to the throne of France had never posed a problem, due to the constant presence of a direct male heir. Louis X would later have a son, John after leaving the throne. In the meantime, Philip, brother of Louis X, became regent of the Kingdom of France, a function he was ready to assume until the future John I came of age. However, Louis' first on had been stillborn, and attention then turned to Louis X's other child, Joan, a daughter. Philip pretexted her youth and the suspicion of being an illegitimate child to sideline her (referring to the Nesle Tower affair) and hastened events by quickly having himself crowned king at the Cathedral of Reims, under escort, in January 1317. Joan was therefore not initially ousted as a daughter, with the University of Paris declaring on 3 February 1317:

Philip better placed than Joan, as he was separated from Saint Louis by only two generations against three for his niece

Moreover, while no woman had become "King of France," some had held principalities, and Mahaut of Artois as Countess of Artois was a peer of the Kingdom of France (before her, one could also mention Eleanor of Aquitaine, duchess); also, Philip the Fair's wife was Queen of Navarre under the name of Joan I, and Louis X had issued a decree for the succession of the Kingdom of Poitiers specifying that:

females should also inherit and have succession in the goods and possessions of the father from whom they were procreated and descended in lawful marriage, as do males.

Philip IV's great-aunt, Agnes of France, convened the Estates General of 1317, where Philip V, succeeding in having the custom interpreted in his favor, the assembly affirmed and approved his accession to the detriment of Louis X's daughter, Joan. He thus legitimized his right to the crown of France to the detriment of women's claim to it. The Salic law was not yet mentioned, but this legal provision was the first step towards the legal exclusion of women from the throne of France.

Philip V died in 1322 without a male heir (but with four daughters). The principles of 1317 then applied. Charles, younger brother of Louis X and Philip, became king under the name of Charles IV but died in 1328; he had only a daughter. There was then no longer a male heir among Philip the Fair's sons, and given the provisions of 1317 concerning women, the question of succession arose again. It was necessary to establish an even stronger principle of the impossibility for women to access the throne, since the King of England Edward III (son of King Edward II, husband of Isabella of France, Philip IV's daughter) now posed as the legitimate heir to the throne. Since the King of England was from a female branch, the French crown then fell to a cousin from the Valois house, who became Philip VI (based on the Latin phrase nemo dat quod non-habet: "no one gives what he does not have"). Edward then renounced and swore allegiance a year later.

Reliance was also placed on Roman law, particularly the Digest of the Corpus Juris Civilis (V, 1, 12), which excluded women from public offices, and texts from the early Frankish monarchy were sought, even fabricated. Unlike the English throne, which had fixed rules, succession in France was according to custom, from Hugh Capet to the Estates of 1317. This exclusion was then justified by texts that had fallen into disuse, dating from the Salian Franks (around 507 to 511): they had nothing to do with royal succession but concerned customary laws of the Barbarians, including inheritance provisions: according to an article of this text, no woman could bequeath a plot of land to an heir (the last paragraph of article 62 De alodis, On Private Property, notes: "As for the Salic land, let no part of the inheritance go to a woman, but let the entire inheritance be transmitted to the male sex"). However, a provision from 575 by King Chilperic notes that in the absence of a male heir, women can inherit and possess with the same rights as men, and the transformation of legal codes by Charlemagne into the Lex Salica Carolina forgot the content of these rules, keeping only the historical and archaic cement of France. The manuscript was brought to light in the library of Saint-Denis by the chronicler Richard Lescot, and somewhat falsified and over-interpreted to justify the exclusion of women from royal succession. Jean Jouvenel, advisor to King Charles VII, completed this reasoning by arguing that "queens, wives of kings, are consecrated only with common chrism and are therefore incapable of healing scrofula", thus unable to continue the thaumaturgical tradition of the kings of France. Thus, by playing with texts, the Salic law imposed itself and became anchored in the French monarchical landscape until the last King of France, Louis Philippe I, in 1848. The future Henry IV would also claim the Salic law to assert his right to the throne of France after the death of Henry III.

This did not prevent some women from taking the lead of principalities, such as Duchess Anne of Brittany, who reigned between 1488 and 1514.

=== Regencies ===
Some women nevertheless accessed the regency of the kingdom: indeed, no strict law framed this within the Fundamental laws of the Kingdom of France. Bertrada of Laon exerted a strong influence on her sons (the future Charlemagne and Carloman I). Anne of Kiev was thus named regent on behalf of the future Philip I. Before dying, Louis VIII chose Blanche of Castile to ensure the regency of Louis IX in 1226; he also entrusted her with the regency of the kingdom in 1248 when he left for the crusade in the Holy Land. Charles VI having become mad, his wife Isabeau of Bavaria presided from 1393 over a Regency Council, where the Greats of the Kingdom sat, but due to her poor mastery of French and lack of allies, she remained politically isolated, plundered the treasury, and allowed John the Fearless to access power). In other cases, the king's death being accidental, for example, the former Queen of France seemed best placed to take the reins of the kingdom until the majority of the one who was "already" King of France (the age of majority was 13 since an ordinance of Charles V promulgated in 1374). Thus, Anne de Beaujeu became regent with her husband between 1483 and 1491, at the beginning of the reign of Charles VIII, Catherine de' Medici between 1560 and 1564 for that of Charles IX (after the accidental death of Henry II and that of Francis II a year later), Marie de' Medici between 1610 and 1617 for Louis XIII (after the assassination of Henry IV; she had managed to be crowned Queen of France jointly on 13 May 1610, and succeeded in being granted the regency of the kingdom after her husband's assassination, assisted by Concino Concini), and Anne of Austria between 1643 and 1651 for Louis XIV. While her son, Francis I, engaged in the Italian War (1515–1516), Louise of Savoy ensured the regency of the kingdom, as well as later during the Italian War of 1521–1526; she negotiated the king's release after the Battle of Pavia and the Treaty of Cambrai with Margaret of Austria in 1529. Also, from 1672, when the Dutch War began, in which King Louis XIV engaged, he entrusted the regency of the kingdom during his absence to his wife Maria Theresa, with broad political powers.

After the death of Francis II, under whose short reign Catherine de' Medici had great influence, she convened the royal council and declared to its members:

Since it has pleased God to take away my eldest son, I do not want to abandon myself to despair, but to submit to the divine will by helping and serving the king, my second son, with the weak measure of my experience. That is why I have decided to keep him with me and to govern the State as a devoted mother should.

Then, she quickly sidelined the other candidates for regency. Assisted by Sillery, Marie de' Medici took advantage of having been crowned by her late husband Henry IV and of having planned to entrust her with the management of the kingdom (assisted by the council) when he went to war; these provisions were nevertheless quickly broken, and Marie governed without hindrance. The same situation occurred during Anne of Austria's regency, who, with the help of a law from Parliament voted on 16 May 1643 (which gave her the administration of the kingdom and the education of the young king), broke the principle of a regency assisted by four greats of the kingdom (the Duke of Orléans, lieutenant general of the kingdom, Cardinal Mazarin, the Chancellor of France, and the Chancellor Séguier, the Secretaries of State Bouthillier and his son Chavigny); she did not wish, in fact, to govern with these creatures placed by Louis XIII and the late Cardinal Richelieu However, she declared at the beginning: "Ah! I was happier at Saint-Germain, far from affairs, for I know nothing about government, and I must govern!", realizing the extreme difficulty of exercising power alone and called upon Cardinal Mazarin, giving him, on 18 May 1643, the position of Prime Minister. She also made him the tutor of her son). After the fall of the July Monarchy, Helene of Mecklenburg-Schwerin, Duchess of Orléans and daughter-in-law of Louis-Philippe, went to the Assembly with her two children, the Count of Paris and the Duke of Chartres, and her brother-in-law, the Duke of Nemours, to have the eldest proclaimed King of the French and become regent. But the Duchess of Orléans' attempt failed, and the assembly proclaimed the Second Republic.

=== Social and religious weight ===
Under the Ancien Régime, women, like men, evolved in a time when the sense of individuality was almost absent, while the community structured social life. It was less common to see girls enter religious life among the lower strata of the population than in the bourgeoisie or aristocracy, where, according to historian François Lebrun, it "constitutes an option in the strategy of heads of families concerned with "placing" their daughters". Contrary to popular opinion, this did not constitute a better situation (domestic tasks were the same), except in the "greater possibility of personal fulfillment linked to a more direct relationship with God". It was to counter forced vocations that the Council of Trent (1545–1563) undertook more thorough checks on the novice's real will and on the ages of entry. Some voluntary nuns nevertheless founded congregations and became abbesses with very great influence, such as Marie Angélique Arnauld at Port-Royal, Barbe Acarie with the Carmelites, Jeanne de Chantal with the Order of the Visitation of Holy Mary, or Marie-Madeleine de Rochechouart, who directed an abbey that was both male and female (despite the separation of bodies).

=== Political roles ===
The medievalist Philippe Contamine notes that at the time of Joan of Arc,

women can dispose [...] of a natural and legitimate power in the political order due to the patrimonialization of resources and rights that we would call public. Majorly, power is hereditary and familial. In the absence of a male heir, a woman can in Catholic Christendom become queen, baroness, or chatelaine in her own right. On the other hand, elective power escapes her. There is no question of her becoming pope or emperor, or exercising municipal responsibilities through election. In short, the personal power of women is very minority but it exists. Moreover, it is admitted by men of knowledge—almost all men of the Church—supposed to form or express common opinion, that women were governed not by reason but by emotion and passion, not to mention their physical weakness. To wage war or render justice, a queen or duchess must rely on men and a masculine council

From the first Estates General convened by Philip the Fair in 1302, women were summoned. They were for all subsequent Estates General (for example, those of 1484 convened by Anne de Beaujeu, daughter of Louis XI, during the minority of Charles VIII), until the Estates General of 1789, where women owners of fiefs were forced to be represented by a man (noble or clergy): widowed or noble women holding fiefs thus took part in the vote but were not directly eligible. They could, however, be represented by a kind of substitute, as is the case in particular in local assemblies. Women also took a very active part in drafting the cahiers de doléances.

== Ancien Régime ==
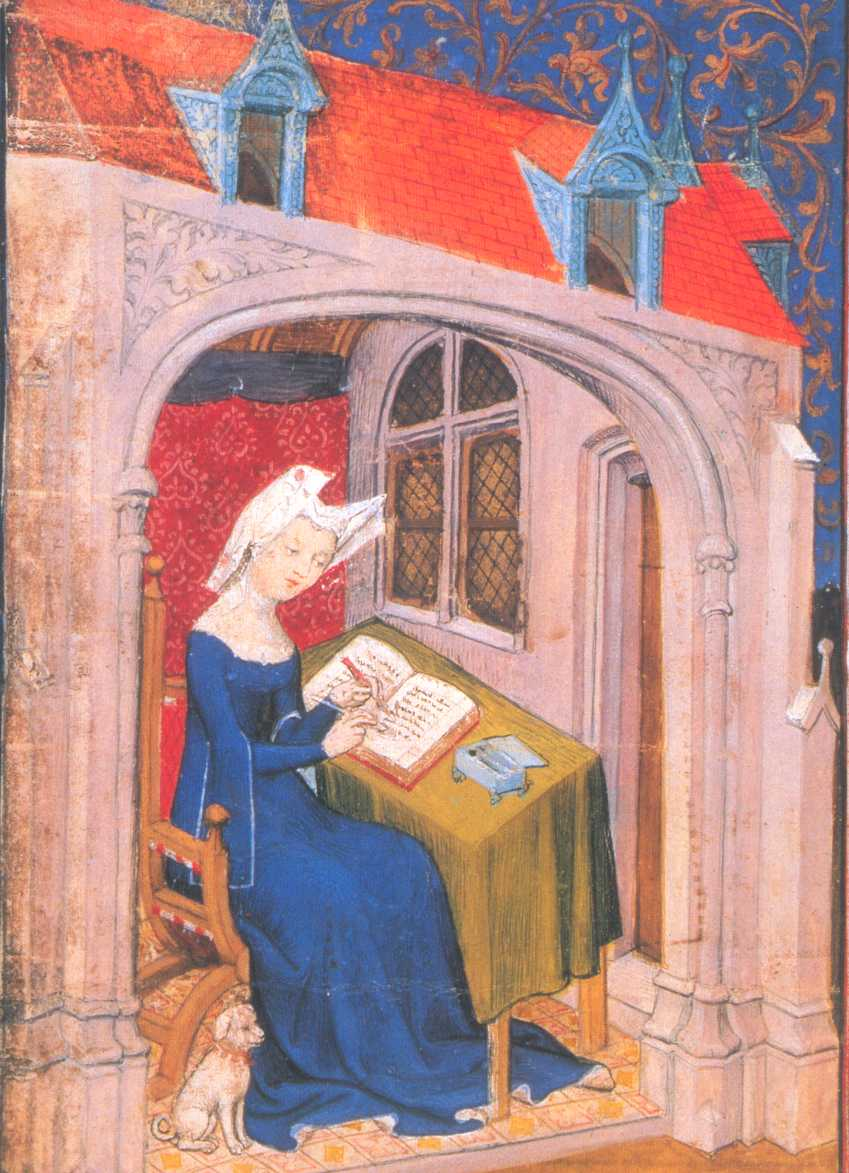
Christine de Pizan, author of The Book of the City of Ladies (1405), writing in her room. Pizan's supposed feminism has been the subject of debate.

In 1622, Marie de Gournay studies in Égalité entre les hommes et les femmes the hierarchical differences between genders, inviting to overcome them.

Under the Revolution, following the speech of the Abbé Sieyès of 20–21 July 1789, distinguishing between "active" and "passive" citizens, women were classified, like children, foreigners, and all those unable to pay a census suffrage, in this second category. Despite the call of Condorcet, they were thus officially excluded from the right to vote by the National Assembly on 22 December 1789, exclusion maintained by the Constitution of 1791 then by a vote of the National Convention on 24 June 1793, a few months before the execution of Olympe de Gouges, author of the Declaration of the Rights of Woman and of the Female Citizen (1791) but who had offered to defend Louis XVI at his trial.

The philosophy of the Enlightenment, which partly carried certain revolutionary ideals, was not favorable to the emancipation of women: in this regard, Diderot or Montesquieu even show a certain contempt towards them. It is rather through literature that some authors account for the abusive authority of the male gender towards them (whether Pierre Choderlos de Laclos, Robert Challe, or even Jean-Jacques Rousseau, despite a generally condescending view of women). The ascendancy of women in public life is found in the importance of the salonnières of the time (Madame Geoffrin, Madame de Tencin, Madame du Deffand, Madame du Châtelet, Julie de Lespinasse, etc.); historian Mona Ozouf notes that despite this social mix, they are not "feminists" and that "the differentiation of male and female roles seems to them, on the contrary, indispensable to the commerce of minds". Amalgamated with the Ancien Régime, these salons and the place these women take will be rejected during the Revolution, Olympe de Gouges speaking of "the nocturnal administration of women".

The Napoleonic Code then enshrined this political inequality between men and women, nuanced by some progress, particularly in terms of marriage (with the divorce law of 1792 and provisions on illegitimate children and the abolition of primogeniture). Apart from these relative advances, it marked a step back from the Ancien Régime, where, at least, aristocratic women enjoyed legal capacity.

== French Revolution ==
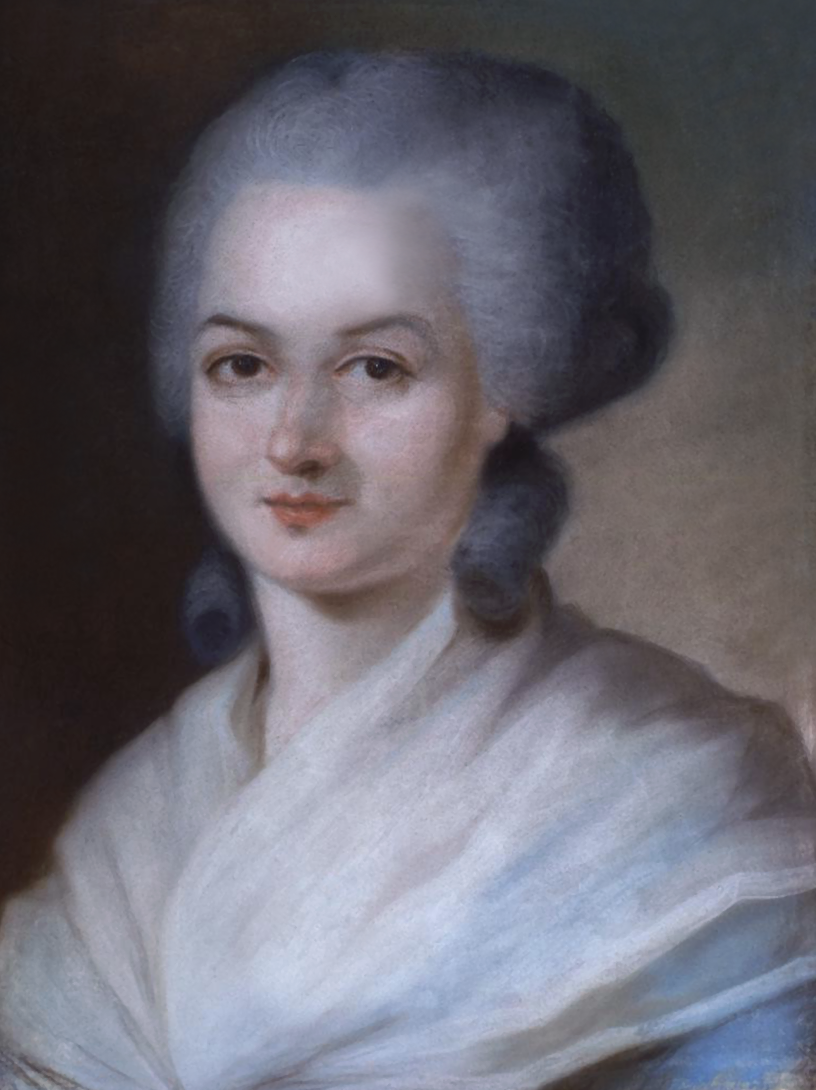
Olympe de Gouges is considered one of the pioneers of feminism.

Despite women's contributions to the drafting of the cahiers de doléances and the role they play—particularly during the October 1789 demonstrations to demand bread and weapons—women are not granted any particular rights in the Declaration of the Rights of Man and of the Citizen; and if the new regime recognizes their civil personality, they will not have the right to vote or to be elected at that time. Nevertheless, with the abolition of primogeniture in 1790, women become equal to men regarding inheritance rights. At the beginning of the Revolution, if women cannot speak from the tribune, they have the opportunity to attend the Assembly's debates, often coming with their knitting and strongly approving the speeches delivered, like Aimée de Coigny or Madame de Beauvau. Exceptionally, Théroigne de Méricourt is invited to speak at the Jacobin Club.

They nonetheless continue to invest the public space, organized in mixed clubs (like that of Claude Dansart) or women's clubs and in mutual aid and charity societies, and participate with passion—like men—in all the political struggles of the time, including combat (notably with the Fernig sisters). Several writings are published, including the Vues législatives pour les femmes (1790) by Marie-Madeleine Jodin, or the Declaration of the Rights of Woman and of the Female Citizen (1791) by Olympe de Gouges.

Anne-Josèphe Théroigne de Méricourt founded the Society of Friends of the Law and called on the people to take up arms and participate in the Storming of the Bastille, for which she was rewarded with the gift of a sword by the National Assembly. Etta Palm d'Aelders originated the first exclusively female circle in the history of France, the Patriotic and Benevolent Society of the Friends of Truth. It was through women like Claire Lacombe, Louison Chabry, or Renée Audou that the march on Versailles was organized, which ended up bringing Louis XVI back to the capital.

Both close to the Girondins, they met tragic ends: Anne-Josèphe Théroigne de Méricourt, interned by her brother in 1794, died at the Salpêtrière Hospital in 1817 after spending the last 23 years of her life in an asylum, and Olympe de Gouges, guillotined in 1793 for opposing the Montagnards. The latter had declared: "Woman has the right to mount the scaffold; she must equally have the right to mount the rostrum" but also "Woman is born free and remains equal to man in rights". If women were deprived of the right to vote, this did not spare them from the punishments reserved for men, and many knew prison or the scaffold following their public or political actions.

From 1792, France's entry into war led some to fight at the borders, while in 1793, a female militancy developed in Paris, carried by women from the Parisian people close to the sans-culottes and the Enragés, to the left of the Jacobins. Although much more marginal than the participation of women as such in revolutionary events, the emergence of this fully-fledged feminist movement marks the entry of this theme onto the political scene.

The two hundred women of the Society of Revolutionary Republican Women created on 10 May 1793, by Claire Lacombe and Pauline Léon, the "tricoteuses", occupy the public galleries of the Constituent Assembly and heckle the deputies, intending to represent the sovereign people. Claire Lacombe and Pauline Léon thus propose to arm women with a petition from 319 Parisian women.

Their vehement calls for Terror and equality, their participation in the fall of the Girondins, and other spectacular demonstrations of the "Enragées" would earn them an image of bloodthirsty furies that would long feed male power's repulsions. Thus, in Les femmes célèbres de 1789 à 1815 (1840), Lairtullier distinguishes the "furies of the guillotine" from the "heavenly abodes" (Madame Roland, close to the Girondins and guillotined in 1793; Lucile Desmoulins, the wife of Camille, guillotined in 1794; or Charlotte Corday). Similarly, Dr. Guillois, speaking at the end of the 19th century of "revolutionary hysteria" about Olympe de Gouges, wrote:

It can be said that many women, especially those who took an active part in the Revolution and played a bloody role in it, were unbalanced.

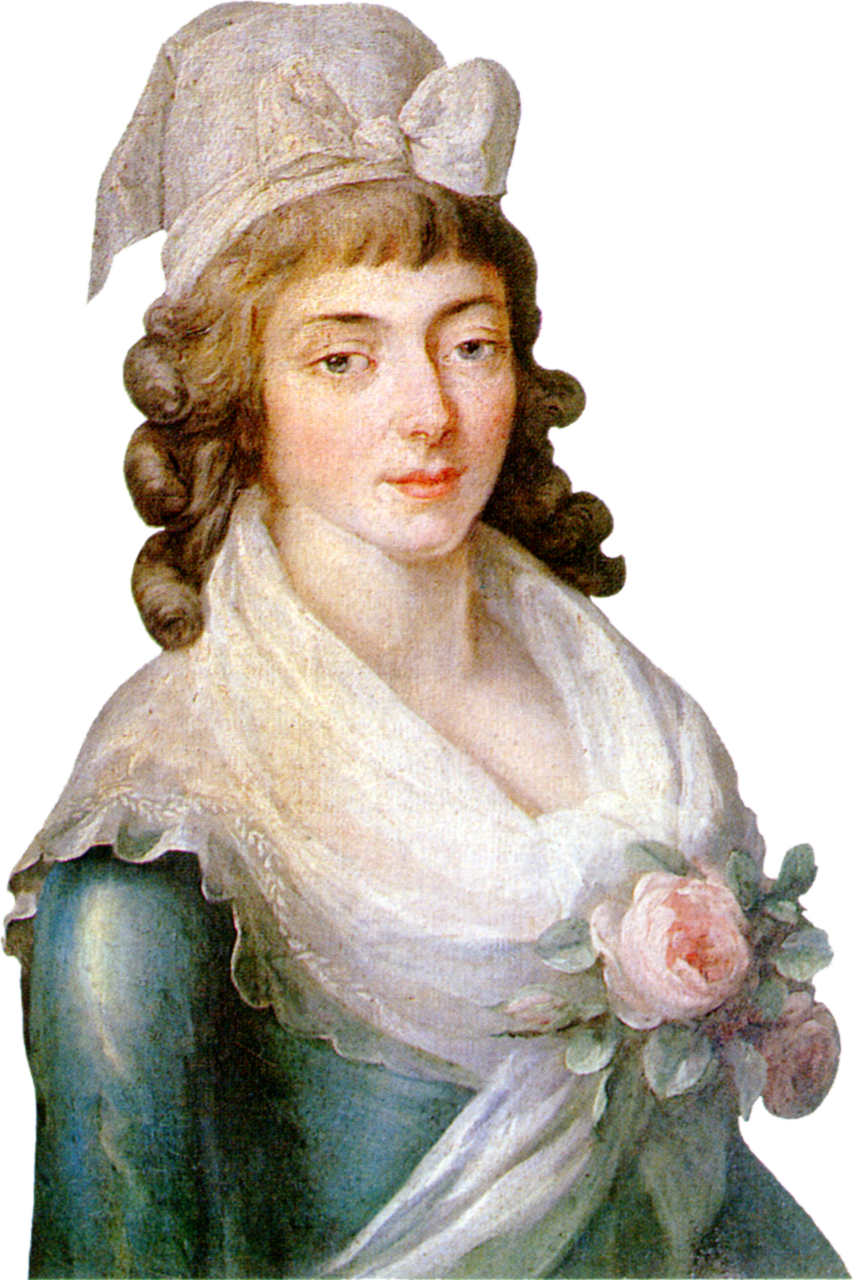
Madame Roland wearing the Girondin cap.

However, the reluctance of men in power excluded these women from the political sphere (as well as some women, who, like Manon Roland, Lucile Desmoulins, or Louise-Félicité de Kéralio, did not engage for political equality but civic equality). Most deputies share the conceptions set out in Rousseau's Emile of a female ideal restricted to the role of mother and wife, rare being those who, like Condorcet ("On the Admission of Women to the Rights of Citizenship"), Gilbert Romme, Charles de Villette, Joseph Lequinio, or Pierre Guyomar claim women's right to vote by virtue of the natural rights inherent to the human race, which at the same time inspire the fight against despotism and slavery (the Revolution, however, only ratifies the revolt of Toussaint Louverture by decree of 4 February 1794); others, like David Williams, without going as far as women's suffrage, nevertheless claim a number of rights, including political ones. The Committee of Public Safety thus charged a commission, chaired by André Amar, to deliberate on the question of political rights granted to women and their right to participate in political clubs: this was refused to them in the fall of 1793, in the name of education and an alleged intrinsically inferior nature, with the argument that women would favor the Reaction being put forward. A report by Lanjuinais specifies the "temporary" nature of this measure, which should be lifted once they catch up with their "lag" on men. Condorcet nonetheless knows his request is unrealistic but proposes a project for education reform, where he plans for mixed instruction in establishments and classes, up to the university level.

The creation of civil marriage in 1792 is nevertheless revolutionary, insofar as it requires mutual consent. Sociologist Irène Théry has thus shown that the establishment of this new marriage contract "means that the domestic space obeys the same principles of freedom and equality that now govern political society". The establishment of divorce obeys the same principles, with women being the most demanding, which leads some male politicians to contest the principle from 1795.

In November 1793, any female political association is banned by the Convention, only one deputy opposes it, Louis-Joseph Charlier, but women will nevertheless continue to play a role until the insurrection of spring 95, whose slogan is "bread and the Constitution of 93", before the generalized repression that marks the end of the Revolution puts a temporary end to this first political speech, for women as for men. In 1795, a decree confirms this ban, in addition to gathering more than five in the street.

During the War in the Vendée, many Vendée women take part in the fighting (like Renée Bordereau), some even leading troops by riding horses, such as the Marquise Victoire de Donnissan de La Rochejaquelein or the Countess de Bruc.

A permission de travestissement prohibits women from wearing pants, except for health reasons. This ordinance is amended in 1892 for those practicing horse riding, and much later, in 1909, for those practicing cycling.

In 1801, the far-left politician Sylvain Maréchal publishes a "bill prohibiting teaching women to read".

It is also worth recalling, as Mona Ozouf notes:

women offered the most obstinate resistance to the dechristianizing measures of the Revolution, to the new system of festivals, to the revolutionary calendar. They are the ones who demand the consoling voice of bells, observe Sundays, try to stop the carts carrying ornaments torn from their altars, boycott the constitutional priests, protect the refractory ones. They are the tenacious organizers of the clandestine cult. This clerical danger, waved like a red rag, will long serve thereafter to better exclude women from universal suffrage.

== First Empire ==
In 1804, the new Napoleonic Code proclaims the legal incapacity of married women. The Emperor thus declares during a meeting of the Council of State: "What is not French is to give authority to women". Elisa Bonaparte, one of his sisters, is, however, head of state and nominally reigns alone, first as Princess of Piombino from 1805 to 1814 and as Grand Duchess of Tuscany from 1809 to 1814. The Penal Code written in 1810 indicates that an adulterous wife risks three months to two years of imprisonment, while the husband risks a fine ranging from 100 to 2,000 francs.

There are some women soldiers who obtain ranks, such as Marie-Jeanne Schellinck (enlisted on 15 April 1792, in the 2nd Belgian battalion and successively corporal, sergeant-major, and second lieutenant in 1806, who receives the Legion of Honor without being part of the Order), Marie-Thérèse Figueur, or Angélique Brûlon.

== July Monarchy ==
Extinguished under the Empire and the Restoration, feminist claims are reborn in France with the Revolution of 1830. A militant feminism develops again in the socialist circles of the romantic generation, particularly among the Saint-Simonians and the Fourierists of the capital. The development of Mariology goes hand in hand with a recognition of the important spiritual role that women play in the future of man. The political theology developed by Abbé Alphonse-Louis Constant is significant in this regard. Feminists participate in the abundant literature of the time, favored by the lifting of censorship on the press. La Femme libre and La Tribune des femmes appear in 1832; Le Conseiller des femmes, edited in Lyon by Eugénie Niboyet, is the first feminist newspaper in the provinces. The role of women during the Revolution is finally commemorated with Les femmes célèbres de 1789 à 1815 by Lairtullier (1840).

Politically, the constitution of the July Monarchy depriving the majority of the population of its rights, their struggle joins that of the first defenders of workers and proletarians, but they also mobilize against the civil status of women, subjected in legal and financial matters to their husbands—"The wife owes obedience to her husband", affirms the Napoleonic Code—and for the restoration of divorce banned under the Restoration in 1816 (it will not be restored until 1884).

Some women claim the right to free love, to the scandal of public opinion. Claire Démar thus delivers in her Appel au peuple sur l'affranchissement de la femme (1833) a radical critique of marriage in which she denounces a form of legal prostitution. However, she is not followed by all Saint-Simoniennes who are keen to distance themselves from accusations of immoralism that strike the movement.

The beginnings of the regime allow for some hopes of evolution. Petitions for the restoration of divorce place it on the political agenda: in 1831 and 1833, deputies vote twice in favor of the law, which is nevertheless rejected by the Chamber of Peers. Feminist claims become inaudible. When Louise Dauriat addresses in 1837 to the deputies a request for revision of the articles of the Civil Code that seem to her contrary to women's rights, she only reaps the laughter of the assembly in return.

== 1848 Revolution and Second Republic ==
As in 1789, women actively participated in the revolutionary days of February 1848. They expressed themselves publicly through associations and newspapers. The laws proclaiming press freedom once again benefited feminist publications: Eugénie Niboyet founded, on 20 March, La Voix des femmes, alongside Jeanne Deroin, Désirée Gay, the poet Louise Colet, and Adèle Esquiros. This newspaper initially served as the main platform for women's demands, which were sidelined by mainstream press. Later, in June, La Politique des Femmes by Désirée Gay appeared, followed by L’Opinion des femmes, published in January 1849 by Jeanne Deroin, with contributions from Claire Bazard, who was close to the Saint-Simonians.

Following their protests, women were granted the right to work on the same terms as men; the national workshops were opened to them, albeit belatedly, on 10 April. They experienced the beginnings of civic participation by electing delegates to the Luxembourg Commission (including Désirée Gay), proposing reforms to their working conditions, and advocating for the creation of nurseries or collective dining facilities.

The right to vote for the election of the future 1848 National Constituent Assembly was central to their concerns: Jenny d'Héricourt, founder of the Society for Women's Emancipation, envisioned that once secured, it would enable legislative action on their broader demands, including the repeal of the Civil Code and the right to divorce. They launched petitions and were received by political authorities. The Women's Rights Committee, chaired by Alix Bourgeois, was told by Armand Marrast, the mayor of Paris, that the decision could only be made by the future legislative body. In response to a slogan proclaiming that there were no longer any proletarians in France, the pamphlet Femmes électeurs et éligibles demanded that "17 million women be included in the decrees, otherwise France will have more than 17 million [proletarians]".

Petitions for the reinstatement of divorce met with no more success than those of the 1830s: the proposal by Justice Minister Adolphe Crémieux to the Chamber in May 1848 was met with jeers. There was particular concern about the threat that women's liberated speech posed to the family. The Women's Club, opened in April 1848, was a forum for debate that provoked strong reactions; some of its sessions turned into riots, and its president, Eugénie Niboyet, was harshly caricatured in the press. It was eventually closed to avoid disturbing public order.

Jeanne Deroin declared her candidacy for the 1849 legislative elections but was mocked by the press and vaudevillists. She explained her approach and delivered several speeches in Paris between 10 and 19 April. She stated:

the cause of the people and the cause of women are intimately linked. The proletarians will not be freed from the harsh servitude of ignorance until they themselves have freed their companions in suffering and hardship

, and:

the Constitution of 1848 legally abolished privileges of race, caste, and wealth by freeing black slaves, abolishing noble titles, and removing the electoral property qualification. But the privilege of sex remained implicit in this Constitution, undermining its foundation, as it negates the principles on which it is based

Few supported her, except Jean Macé, while others, such as Pierre-Joseph Proudhon (she was a Saint-Simonian), opposed her, and even women like George Sand or Daniel Stern ridiculed her.

== Second Empire and Third Republic ==
The Second Empire marked a decline in feminist demands. The anti-feminism of Proudhon or Michelet (La femme, 1859, and Les femmes et la Révolution, 1854; "every party perishes because of women," he wrote about the Revolution) had a lasting influence on public opinion. These works were, however, counterbalanced by sympathy for women expressed in Le génie de la révolution by Charles-Louis Chassin and Le socialisme pendant la Révolution by Amédée Le Faure, both published in 1863. Nevertheless, the Second Empire saw several advancements in the field of women's education. Additionally, several feminist organizations were established under the Third Republic.

=== Women's education reforms ===
In 1836, primary education for women was established. Under the Second Republic, the Falloux Law of March 1850 set the goal of establishing a girls' primary school in every commune with more than 800 inhabitants. The Duruy Law of 1867 aligned this threshold with that for boys, setting it at 500.

Curricula remained defined according to the social roles assigned to women (including household tasks and childcare); convents and religious congregations primarily handled girls' education. The push for women's education found support in liberal opposition to the regime, particularly among Saint-Simonians. Elisa Lemonnier established the first vocational schools for girls in 1862. Julie-Victoire Daubié, with the support of François Barthélemy Arlès-Dufour, an influential Saint-Simonian industrialist, obtained permission to take the baccalauréat exam, which she passed in Lyon in 1861 at age 37 (despite no official text prohibiting girls from taking the exam). Madeleine Brès owed her enrollment in the medical faculty to her tenacity and the intervention of Empress Eugénie and Education Minister Victor Duruy. These pioneers remained isolated, however: the second French female baccalauréat holder, Emma Chenu, earned her diploma in 1863, two years after Daubié. Improving women's education remained a key focus for French feminists: in 1866, André Léo founded an association dedicated specifically to this issue.

Structural reforms in secondary and higher education occurred under the Third Republic. Girls' colleges and lycées, with curricula that did not allow for the baccalauréat, were established by the Sée Law (1880). Women were also guaranteed teacher training: women's normal schools, made mandatory in each department in 1879, and the École normale supérieure de Sèvres (1881) trained female teachers and professors. The first lycée to open was the Cité Scolaire Georges Clemenceau in Montpellier; in Paris, these included, in chronological order, the Lycée Fénelon (1883), the Lycée Racine (1886), the Lycée Molière (1888), the Lycée Lamartine (1893), the Lycée Victor-Hugo (1895), and the Lycée Victor-Duruy (1912). Between 1881 and 1896, 32 lycées and 28 colleges were created. By 1900, there were 40 lycées. In 1907, there were 103 girls' institutions (47 lycées and 56 colleges), and by 1931, there were 206 (74 lycées, 97 colleges, 35 secondary courses). Additionally, in 1907, there were 297 certified female professors and 324 with qualifications or degrees, and by 1931, 869 certified female professors and 997 with qualifications or degrees. Finally, there were 25,000 female students in 1907, compared to 60,000 in 1931. Even before World War I, 60% of the teaching workforce was female; to train them, there were about twenty women's normal schools in 1879, but their limited number prompted the state to create 64 during the 1880s. On 1 May 1879, Minister Jules Ferry appointed Pauline Kergomard as a delegate to inspect kindergartens for young children, which became nursery schools in 1881, and she developed and improved them until her retirement in 1917.

=== Paris Commune ===
During the Paris Commune (1871), the first mass women's movement was formed: the Union des femmes pour la défense de Paris et les soins aux blessés, initiated by Elisabeth Dmitrieff, a young Russian aristocrat, and Nathalie Le Mel, a bookbinder worker (recognized as the women's section of the International). However, it consisted of only "a few groups of revolutionary women". Women demanded the right to work and equal pay (a partial implementation was introduced for female teachers). The Union of Women conducted a census of workshops abandoned by employers (the "free riders") who fled to Versailles and organized self-managed workshops; the Commune recognized free union (providing pensions to widows of fédérés, whether married or not, and to their legitimate or natural children), equal pay, access to education, and divorce. Women implemented the decree separating church and state in schools and hospitals; they fought, like Louise Michel and others, in fédéré uniforms and defended Paris against the "Versaillais" on barricades (about a hundred at Place Blanche, with Nathalie Le Mel). On the path to women's emancipation, the Commune marked a significant step. However, historian Jacques Rougerie notes that "we do not see women demanding, as some did in 1848, a right to vote that their revolutionary comrades would surely have refused".

=== Late 19th to early 20th century ===
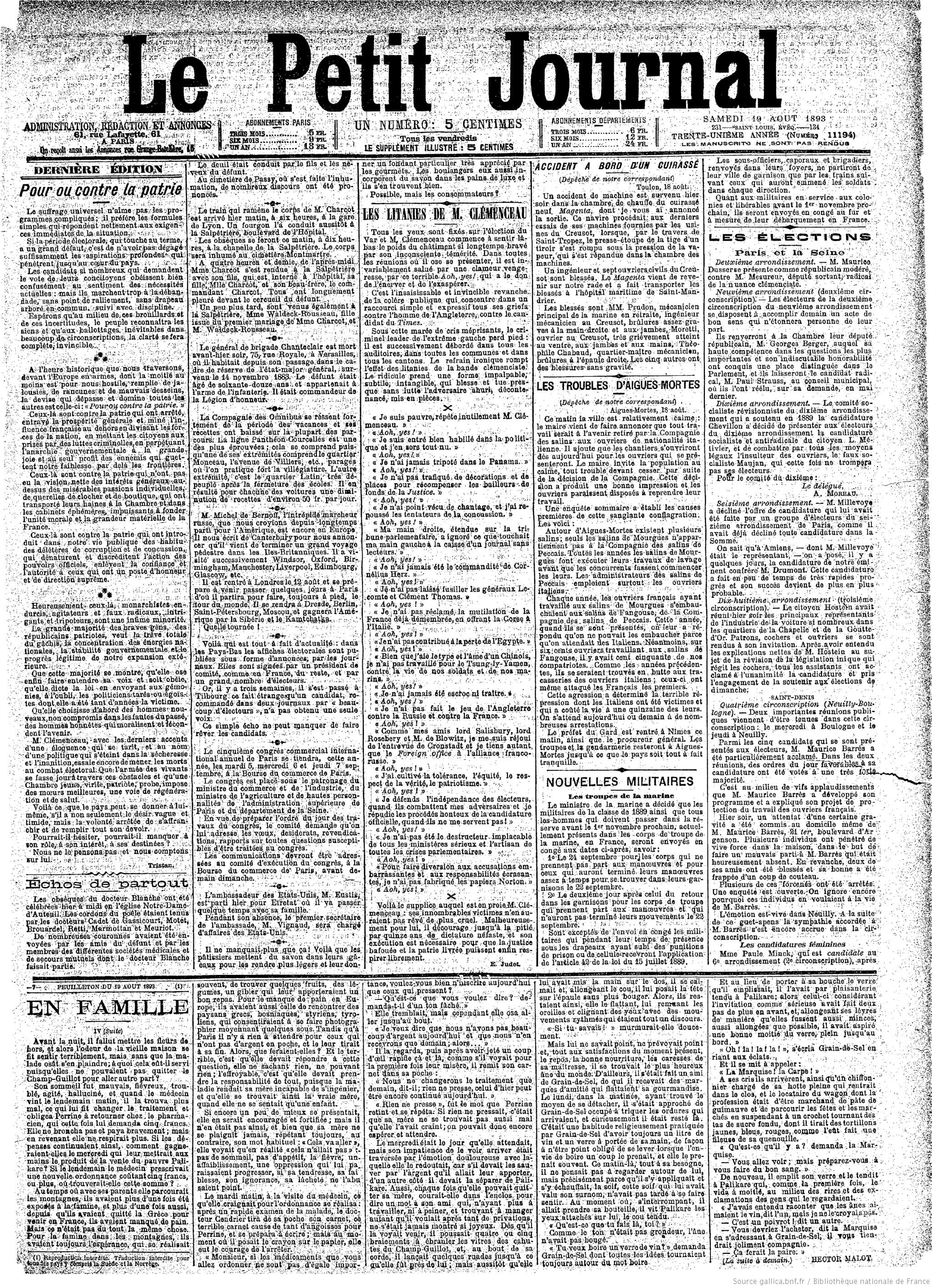
The front page of Le Petit Journal from 19 August 1893. In addition to defamation against Georges Clemenceau ("Aoh, yes!"), the newspaper notes the de facto candidacy of Paule Minck in the 6th arrondissement of Paris for the 1893 legislative elections.

The Third Republic was characterized in France by the formation of more durable and structured reformist feminist organizations, centered around collectives and a lasting militant press, initiated particularly by the novelist André Léo and journalist Léon Richer, before becoming more feminized, notably with Hubertine Auclert, who promoted new forms of action such as tax strikes until women could vote, as well as new demands like access to sports, the fight against alcoholism and prostitution, and, less commonly among radical feminists like Nelly Roussel and Madeleine Pelletier, contraception, abortion, and sexual freedom. Unlike British suffragettes, who did not hesitate to use violence and engage in illegal actions, French feminist movements remained committed to using "legal and respectable means". This new wave of mobilization followed the one during the Commune (1871), with prominent figures like Louise Michel.

Maria Deraismes and the writer Léon Richer (notably author of Le Droit des femmes) founded, on 16 April 1870, the Association pour le Droit des Femmes, chaired by Victor Hugo. The Société pour l'amélioration du sort de la femme et la revendication de ses droits, chaired by Maria Deraismes, was established in 1878; the moderate Ligue Française pour le Droit des Femmes was created in 1882 by Léon Richer. Le Droit des femmes, the first suffragist group, was founded in 1876 by Hubertine Auclert (the first activist to use the term "feminism"), supplemented on 13 February 1881, by the newspaper La Citoyenne. In 1891, the Fédération Française des Sociétés Féministes marked the entry of the term "feminism" into militant vocabulary. The newspaper La Fronde, created by Marguerite Durand, was the first "daily entirely written, printed, and sold by women". Before 1914, there were about sixty feminist associations.

The National Council of French Women (CNFF), founded in the wake of the 1901 Association Law, aimed to be apolitical and secular. Its activists, mainly from the bourgeoisie, were republicans, socialists, or Protestants, initiated into public action through social and philanthropic activities: it was a section of the International Council of Women (founded in 1888) and federated several associations while allowing them autonomy. The French Union for Women's Suffrage federated feminists in favor of women's suffrage in 1909.

Rejecting the activism of British suffragettes (except for Hubertine Auclert and Caroline Kauffmann, who "disrupt National Assembly sessions"), these major reformist federations sought to prove women's responsibility and integrated into the republican model by forging ties with the male political world (notably the Radical Party), aiming to influence legislative activity. Nevertheless, on 1 July 1901, the first bill proposing women's suffrage (for single, widowed, or divorced women, but not married women) was introduced, and the Buisson Report of 16 July 1909, proposed women's election and eligibility under the same conditions as men. Left-wing politicians (Jean Jaurès, Marcel Sembat, René Viviani, or Fernand Buisson) and right-wing politicians (Louis Marin) were receptive to feminist demands and supported their efforts. A demonstration for women's suffrage took place on 3 May 1908, and another on 5 July 1914, the largest women's demonstration in French history, gathering about 6,000 people. Notable attendees included Marguerite Durand, Caroline Kauffmann, Séverine, Marguerite de Witt-Schlumberger, president of the French Union for Women's Suffrage, and Lydie Martial, president of the Société pour l'amélioration du sort de la femme. At the 1910 legislative elections, 20 women ran, garnering up to 27% of the votes in one constituency, though these were deemed invalid. A women's plebiscite organized by feminists in April 1914 collected 505,972 "yes" votes in favor of women's suffrage.

A distinction was made between "moderate feminism," focused on social issues, "radical feminism," demanding equal rights with men, and Christian feminism. In 1913, Raymond Poincaré, President of the Republic, received delegates from the 10th International Congress of Women (created in 1888 in the United States) at the Élysée Palace, who submitted proposals to advance women's political and legal rights. Some progress was made in women's rights: they could become lawyers starting in 1899 and freely dispose of their salaries while married starting in 1907.

By the law of 9 April 1881, married women could make deposits and withdrawals from savings banks; by that of 20 July 1886, they could contribute to specialized pension funds; and finally, by that of 13 July 1907, they could pursue a profession unrelated to their husband's and freely dispose of their salary. As early as 1875, bourgeois women could work in the public sector. On 30 June 1899, the Chamber of Deputies authorized women to become lawyers (by 319 votes to 114), which the Senate approved on 13 November 1900.

=== World War I ===
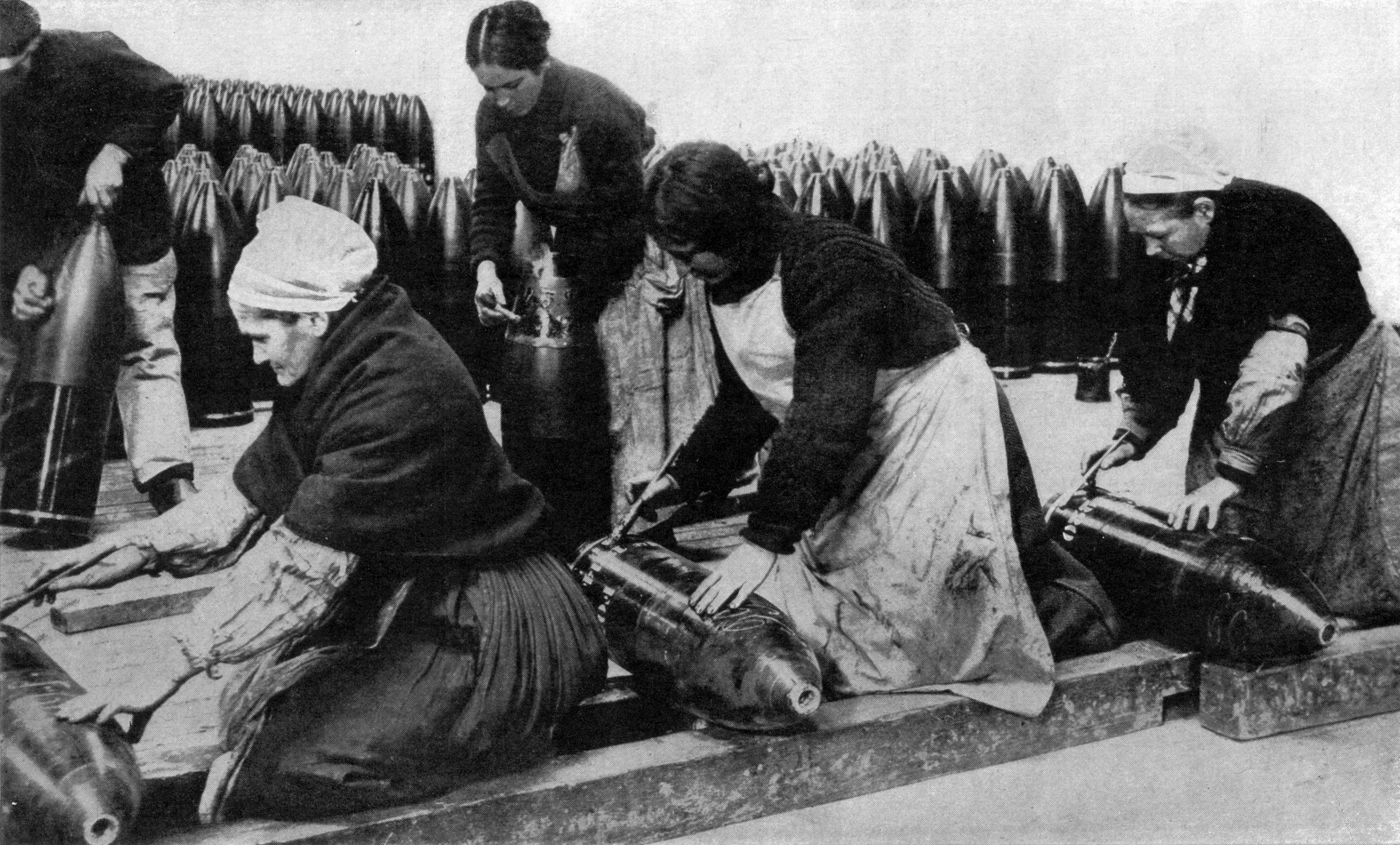
Women of all ages manufacturing shells, France, 1917.

During World War I, the vast majority of feminist organizations in France supported the war effort:

upon the declaration of war, feminists rallied to the sacred union and postponed their demands to focus on their duties as "brave French women," multiplying social initiatives.

Some hoped to capitalize on this loyalty. Additionally, the demands of total war led women to replace men in factories, thus gaining access to the workforce. This change allowed some women, particularly from artistic or intellectual elites, to emancipate themselves during the Roaring Twenties of the early interwar period. However, most women were returned to domestic roles after the war.

Socialist circles and their women's organizations also aligned with their respective nations. Nevertheless, dissenting voices were heard: in France, Hélène Brion, Madeleine Vernet, and Louise Saumoneau. The latter attended the International Socialist Women's Conference in March 1915 in Bern (Switzerland), initiated by Clara Zetkin, which gathered activists loyal to internationalism.

On 7 August 1914, women were called to work by government leader René Viviani. In cities, those manufacturing weapons in factories (such as the Schneider factories in Le Creusot) were nicknamed "munitionnettes." Women distributed mail, handled administrative tasks, and drove transport vehicles. On 3 June 1915, they were granted paternal authority in the absence of the father.

Additionally, an allowance for the wives of mobilized men was provided. For example, in the Pas-de-Calais, a main allowance of 1.25 francs (increased to 1.50 F on 4 August 1917), with an additional 0.50 F in 1914 (raised to 1 F on 4 August 1917), was paid to the wives of conscripted men. By 31 July 1918, 171,253 requests had been reviewed by cantonal commissions, with over 115,000 beneficiaries approved, resulting in a monthly expenditure of approximately 6 million francs from 2 August 1914, to 21 July 1918. War charities and various solidarity movements complemented the system.

With the Great War, women took their first steps toward emancipation. However, for many, the post-war period meant a return to normalcy and traditional values. Some, however, achieved unprecedented levels of responsibility. Approximately 700,000 war widows became heads of households. Unlike other countries, such as Germany, the United States, or Turkey, women in France did not gain the right to vote. The feminist movement, ignored by Jaurès in his Histoire socialiste de la Révolution française, was recognized by some historians, with the Histoire générale du féminisme (1921) by Léon Abensour or Les femmes pendant la Révolution (1931) by Jeanne Bouvier.

In 1916, deputy Maurice Barrès proposed granting the right to vote to widows and mothers of soldiers killed during the Great War, calling his project the "suffrage of the dead".

=== Suffragist action ===
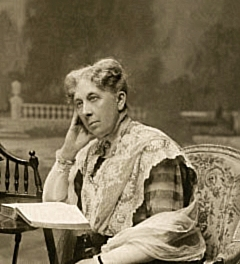
Marguerite de Witt-Schlumberger.

Organized into several associations, some of significant size, the French suffragist movement did not reach the scale of its British counterpart. Reluctant to resort to direct action, it also did not adopt the radical methods that made the British "suffragettes" famous.

The two main reformist organizations leading the fight for women's suffrage were the French Union for Women's Suffrage (U.F.S.F.), founded in Paris in 1909 and led from 1924 to 1946 by Cécile Brunschvicg, and the Ligue française pour le droit des femmes, led by Maria Vérone. These two major feminist federations, composed mainly of bourgeois Parisian women, sought to expand their support within male political organizations, especially in the provinces where their presence was less established. Meetings, held in town halls or schools, were the primary tool of this propaganda, targeting mainly the middle and upper classes, as well as local notables. Speakers were mostly recruited from among lawyers, already accustomed to public speaking. Less experienced speakers trained through workshops teaching oratory techniques and refining suffragist rhetoric. Some, like Marthe Bray, considered these methods insufficient to reach a broader audience unfamiliar with "new ideas" about women. Thus, in 1926, she organized a suffragist tour of France targeting "the market public, farms, small villages, the humble, in short".

Some organizations, such as the National Council of French Women, campaigned fictitiously by presenting candidates at the 1925 municipal elections in Paris (of the 80 candidates, 10 were "elected," but their votes were quickly invalidated). Other activists, like Jane Némo in Paris, used male proxies to indirectly run in elections and participate in electoral meetings. The resources available to major federations enabled large-scale campaigns: for the 1929 municipal elections, the UFSF distributed two million leaflets and 50,000 posters nationwide. However, at these same elections, the Communist Party placed women in eligible positions on its lists in the Paris suburbs: some women were elected and even served, but their elections were quickly invalidated by the relevant courts. In 1920, while opposition to abortion led to a legal ban on advocating for it, women could join a union without their husband's consent. The 1939 family code continued to condemn abortion; feminist Madeleine Pelletier, an advocate for it, was imprisoned. A bonus for the first birth was introduced. Nevertheless, feminist associations generally did not support abortion and welcomed the laws of 1920 and 1923.

Street demonstrations were approached cautiously and never reached a scale likely to disturb public order. Sometimes, activists demonstrated in cars or on floats, holding signs. These actions prompted immediate reactions from authorities, who opposed the protests and frequently made arrests. The Senate's inaction provoked the boldest responses. Protests intensified in 1928 when the Upper Chamber refused to consider the bill passed by the National Assembly. Activists with signs, usually numbering no more than a dozen, stood outside the Jardin du Luxembourg at each new session; they were regularly arrested and taken to the police station. In 1932, Jane Valbot interrupted two Senate sessions in January and February, throwing leaflets into the chamber and chaining herself to a bench. In 1934, journalist Louise Weiss attempted to renew the feminist action repertoire, drawing inspiration from British suffragettes. Her trademark was high-profile actions aimed at the press during major sporting events or elections. However, her activism was short-lived: in July 1936, she withdrew from the "suffragist scene".

The universalist arguments, long developed and reiterated before 1914, continued to form the core of suffragist discourse. They relied on the republican tradition and human rights to justify the advent of a "truly universal" suffrage that would not exclude half of humanity from political rights. However, differentialist arguments gained ground during this period. It was argued that women, by voting, could assert their perspectives and traditionally attributed qualities to improve institutional functioning, either by moralizing them or by focusing attention on "issues of education, hygiene, physical and moral health, housing...".

Left-wing parties were concerned, as they were torn between defending women's emancipation and the risk of women becoming a potential conservative electorate. As early as 13 July 1919, Pope Benedict XV called for the establishment of women's suffrage, driven by Christian humanism as well as the belief that women were more inclined toward piety and a Catholic, conservative vote. Thus, the SFIO disseminated the official position of the Second International, notably articulated by German communist Clara Zetkin in 1907 at the first International Socialist Women's Conference in Stuttgart (German Empire), which stated: "socialist women must not ally with bourgeois feminists", marking a clear divide with those believed to support parties outside the International. However, the Catholic Church's stance advanced the cause, as it managed to mobilize a significant number of women through associations like the Civic Women's Union of Andrée Butillard and the National Union for Women's Vote of Mrs. Levert-Chotard. The Croix-de-Feu, a nationalist group, supported the introduction of women's suffrage and family voting. In 1939, the latter association had 100,000 members. Other progress was made in the interwar period toward gender equality, such as women's access to corporate chambers and unions, as well as equal salaries for female teachers (1919) and postal workers (1939).

A women's baccalauréat was created in 1919; by 1924, it was no longer distinct from the men's.

=== Parliament and government ===
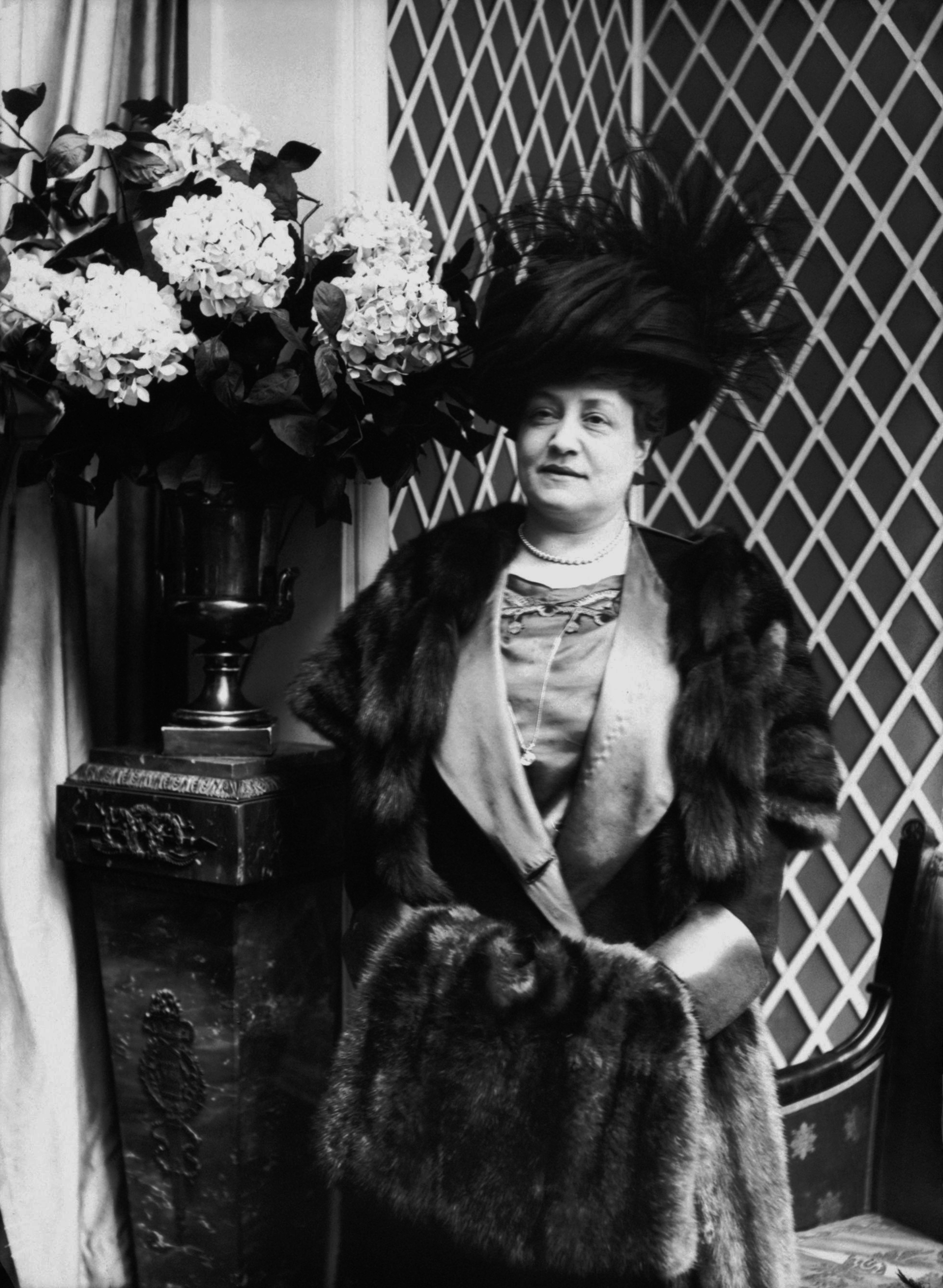
The feminist Marguerite Durand in 1910.

Reformist feminists sought to place the issue of women's suffrage on the political agenda, cultivating relationships with men who supported their cause within political parties. Elections provided opportunities to promote their views. Women had been voting since 1917 in the USSR, 1918 in the United Kingdom (from age 30), 1919 in Germany, and 1920 in the United States. As early as 1906, deputy Paul Dussaussoy introduced the first bill to grant women the right to vote, starting with local elections. In 1919, French feminists secured a principled agreement from all parties on women's suffrage, except for Action Française. This agreement remained a dead letter. With a large majority (329 for and 95 against), women's suffrage was passed by the Chamber of Deputies on 20 May 1919. On 21 November 1922, by 156 votes to 134, the Senate refused to consider this bill. From its founding in 1920, after the Tours Congress, the French Communist Party accepted women in a women's section, but their numbers quickly declined: historian Sylvie Chaperon notes that "with Bolshevization, expulsions and resignations quickly ended this brief companionship". In 1924, Joséphine Pencalet became the first woman elected to a municipal council in Douarnenez, on the PCF list. A few months after her election, the Council of State annulled her election, as women then had neither the right to vote nor to run for office.

In 1924, the Radical Party accepted women into its ranks (e.g., Marcelle Kraemer-Bach), even though the party held a majority in the Senate and blocked votes on women's suffrage, believing that women would primarily vote for parties tied to the Catholic Church. Marguerite Durand also joined the Republican Socialist Party, and Germaine Poinso-Chapuis the Popular Democratic Party. However, the historian notes that these affiliations, for these women, "put a serious damper on their feminism". Some politicians (including 440 deputies in 1923) considered developing the principle of family voting. A new bill on women's suffrage in municipal and cantonal elections was approved by the Chamber of Deputies in April 1925. A legislative resolution was adopted on 12 July 1927, which "invites the government to hasten, before the Senate, the discussion of the bill passed by the Chamber of Deputies on women's suffrage in municipal elections"; it was renewed on 31 March 1931, and in 1935, but the Senate consistently refused to schedule the debate. The same occurred in June 1936 and July 1936, but the government abstained, and the Senate did not even place the passed bill on its agenda.

After the 1929 crisis and its consequences, feminist demands and their resonance became less prominent: priority was given to reserving remaining jobs for men and focusing on essentials.

=== Popular Front ===
During the Popular Front, on 5 June 1936, Prime Minister Léon Blum appoints three women to the position of Secretaries of State in his first government: Cécile Brunschvicg to National Education, Suzanne Lacore to Child Protection, and Irène Joliot-Curie to Scientific Research. The first two remain in office until 21 June 1937, the latter having resigned three months after her appointment for health reasons. It is mainly about satisfying feminists, Blum having ultimately refused to help pressure the Chamber due to his alliance with the Radical Party; this does not escape some feminists like Louise Weiss who, discouraged, temporarily abandon their struggle. In reality, the three government members are limited: their vote does not count in the council of ministers, and the supervising minister of each exercises strong dependence. In 1938, the civil incapacity of married women, in place since 1804, is abolished, and women can now serve in the French army.

== Vichy regime ==
Under the Vichy regime, women are clearly assigned to a role of housewives and exemplary mothers. Nevertheless, the State considers them as "a pivot of the return to traditional and family values". In the concern for a new demographic policy, mothers of large families are honored: Marshal Pétain is indeed the official godfather of families with 15 children, to whom he sends gifts ("a photograph and a silver-plated metal cup"). Although a discreet Mother's Day has existed since 1928, the Vichy regime greatly develops it, every last Sunday of May, around masses organized for the occasion as well as a speech by the head of state and a distribution of medals to mothers with a high number of children (ten children correspond to a gold medal).

== Fourth and Fifth Republics ==
=== Suffrage ===
The Free France installed in Algiers, since 17 September 1943, a Provisional Consultative Assembly whose members are not elected but appointed, and called "delegates". One woman is part of it, Marthe Simard, who sits from 20 October 1943, to 25 July 1944 (Lucie Aubrac, appointed but unable to travel to Algeria, will be replaced by her husband Raymond Aubrac). From 7 November 1944, the Consultative Assembly now sits in Paris, with 16 women being part of this new assembly: Lucie Aubrac, Madeleine Braun, Gilberte Brossolette, Marie Couette, Claire Davinroy, Andrée Defferre-Aboulker, Alice Delaunay, Martha Desrumeaux, Annie Hervé, Marie-Hélène Lefaucheux, Mathilde Gabriel-Péri, Pauline Ramart, Marthe Simard, Marie-Claude Vaillant-Couturier, Marianne Verger, and Andrée Viénot.

Article 17 of the Ordinance of 21 April 1944 grants women's suffrage to women: after heated parliamentary discussions at the Consultative Assembly in Algiers, it is mainly for General de Gaulle to "break with the hated Third Republic, prove to the Allies his attachment to democracy, and undoubtedly also counter the advance of the communists". They vote for the first time in the municipal elections of April 1945, for the second time in the cantonal elections of September 1945 (where 39 regional councilors are elected); the first national election in which they participate is the legislative election of October 1945 (33 women become deputies, 16 from the PCF, 6 from the SFIO, 8 from the MRP, one from the Republican and Resistant Union, one from the Popular and Peasant Republic, and one from the Republican Union): although there is no "women's vote", there is a certain tendency to lean towards the MRP. There are 6 women and 1,024 men among the Companions of the Liberation. The Constitution of 27 October 1946 enshrines equality between men and women in its preamble: "the law guarantees women, in all fields, rights equal to those of men". If the right to vote for French women arrives late compared to other European countries, it nevertheless remains that with more than 5% of female deputies elected in the first legislative election, France has one of the most feminized Parliaments of its time, compared to some national assemblies of Scandinavian countries. Women can also access the judiciary, and regulated prostitution is finally banned. In 1948, the Universal Declaration of Human Rights recognizes equality between the two sexes.

=== Access to positions of power ===
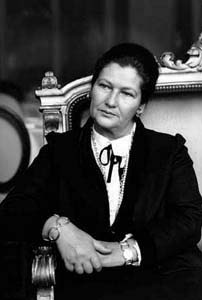
Simone Veil, Minister of Health from 1974 to 1979 and Minister of State, Minister of Social Affairs, Health, and the City from 1993 to 1995.

A prerequisite often indispensable for access to power, the path of women within the bodies of the various parties constituting the French political scene slowly enriches, as exemplified by the Gaullist movements.

Andrée Viénot is the first woman member of a government of the Fourth Republic, Under-Secretary of State for Youth and Sports, in the first Georges Bidault government: she remains in office from 18 December 1946, to 16 January 1947. Between 24 November 1947, and 19 July, Germaine Poinso-Chapuis, Minister of Public Health and Population in the first Schuman government, is the first woman minister with full powers, and the only one of the entire Fourth Republic. No woman sits in the government until 1957, when Jacqueline Thome-Patenôtre becomes Under-Secretary of State for Construction and Housing in the Bourgès-Maunoury government between 17 June and 6 November 1957. Under the presidency of Charles de Gaulle, only two women enter the government, Nafissa Sid Cara from 1959 to 1962 as Secretary of State for Social Issues in Algeria and Marie-Madeleine Dienesch from 1968 as Secretary of State for National Education and then for Social Affairs.

It is President of the Republic Valéry Giscard d'Estaing who first initiates a change. In his conception of politics, which he wants to be modern and on which he campaigned, he hears female claims and thus appoints women ministers, such as Simone Veil to Health, or at the head of institutions (Jacqueline Baudrier as CEO of Radio France); they have the particularity of belonging to civil society, while François Mitterrand, during his first term as president, will (at least initially) call more on women politicians from the field than on technocrats (like the Énarque Ségolène Royal as an advisor). Except for Gisèle Halimi and Anne Zelensky, many feminists do not defend women's access to these positions, readily positioning themselves on the far left and refusing to go along with parliamentary and ministerial politics. In 1974, a Minister for Gender Equality, Diversity and Equal Opportunities is created, occupied by Françoise Giroud between July 1974 and August 1976 within the first Chirac government, where she launches "one hundred and one measures" in favor of women (establishment of own rights for women, fight against discrimination, opening of so-called masculine professions, etc.). In 1981, a Ministry of Women's Rights is created, occupied by Yvette Roudy. A circular from 1986 published in the Official Journal recommends feminizing the names of professions as well as ranks.

=== New claims ===
The law of 13 April 1946 (or "Loi Marthe Richard") consecrates the closure of brothels. As early as 1949, The Second Sex by Simone de Beauvoir highlights inequalities between men and women but in a tumultuous context where the Catholic Church, like the Communist Party, promote a female model linked to maternity and the importance of the home (these two pillars of social life will evolve their ideological corpus at the beginning of the 1960s) and where feminist movements are marginalized. In 1956, the Happy Maternity is founded, which becomes in 1960 the Mouvement français pour le planning familial. The struggle for women's rights intensifies after May 68, becoming one of the main levers of the sexual revolution. Thus, the struggle for the right to contraception (Neuwirth Law of 1967) and to abortion (Bobigny trial in 1972 where Gisèle Halimi defends and obtains the acquittal of a minor, Marie-Claire Chevalier, who aborted after being raped, foundation of the Mouvement pour la liberté de l'avortement et de la contraception (MLAC) in 1973, Manifesto of the 343, Veil Act of 1975 which authorizes for a period of 5 years the voluntary termination of pregnancy; this temporary authorization does not therefore mark the end of mobilization) is carried by various groups, including in particular the French Movement for Family Planning, founded in 1960 and which works in cooperation with the CFDT – unions are just beginning to devote themselves to these issues – and the Women's Liberation Movement (MLF). In 1956, Évelyne Sullerot, Marie-Andrée Lagroua Weill-Hallé, and Dr. Pierre Simon, found the Happy Maternity movement, which becomes the Family Planning in 1960. By the law of 13 July 1965, married women can freely dispose of their property.

On 26 August 1970, a demonstration takes place under the Arc de Triomphe in Paris; a wreath is laid for the "wife of the Unknown Soldier". The Women's Liberation Movement (MLF) appears in the public space. On 4 June 1970, mothers become heads of the family on the same basis as fathers; the law states that "both spouses together ensure the moral and material direction of the family". From 1975, women no longer risk three years of imprisonment for adultery. Also, the UN declares 1975 "Year of the Woman". Like for boys, a law of 1975 lowers the age of civil majority for girls from 21 to 18 years. The law of 11 July 1975, reintroduces divorce by mutual consent, which had fleetingly appeared under the Revolution of 1789, and abolishes the offense of adultery. In 1982, 8 March officially becomes in France the Women's Day. The Roudy Law of 13 July 1983, criminally establishes professional equality between men and women; it is reinforced by the Génisson Law of 9 May 2001. A circular dated 11 March 1986, recommends the feminization of job and function names, following the work of a commission set up by Minister Yvette Roudy. In July 1992, Hélène Carrère d'Encausse, Simone Veil, and Françoise Gaspard write to François Mitterrand asking him to allow women to be admitted to the Panthéon (Sophie Berthelot has rested there since 1907, but only as the wife of Marcelin); this is done in 1995 with the entry of the ashes of physicist Marie Curie. On 11 October 1993, a tribune is published in the newspaper Le Monde, under the title "Manifesto of the 577" (from the number of deputies) by male and female intellectuals who demand parity in local and national assemblies.

=== Parity ===
In 1957, the Treaty of Rome declares the obligation for the six member states to ensure equal pay between men and women. On 18 November 1982, the Constitutional Council rejects the establishment of a quota of 25% women on the lists of candidates for municipal elections (in fact, the presence of 75% of candidates of the same sex): this refusal was motivated in some by a principle of republican equality, which a law on parity, paradoxically, would not respect. On 19 October 1995, the Observatoire de la parité entre les femmes et les hommes is created, which studies inequalities between the sexes.

Legislation concerning parity in "list" elections takes shape from the 2000s. A constitutional law promulgated on 8 July 1999, modifies Article 4 to "the law promotes equal access of women and men to electoral mandates and elective functions" and Article 4 to "political parties and groups contribute to the implementation of this principle". A first so-called "parity" law, despite the absence of this word in the texts, is adopted on 6 June 2000, and obliges political parties to include in their lists of candidates the same number of men and women, under penalty of financial sanctions. This law is supplemented on 31 January 2007, with the obligation for parties to alternate on their lists candidates of both sexes, in "A-B-A-B" mode or "A-B" for elections presenting only one candidate and their substitute, under penalty of even heavier financial sanctions; this concerns municipal elections in municipalities with more than 3,500 inhabitants. The 2007 law also requires parity in these municipal councils as well as in regional councils. A last law, adopted on 16 December 2010, provides that "public funding takes into account respect for parity in territorial elections (from 2014)".

In 2005, France ranks 85th among countries for women's representation in parliament (21st out of 25 in Europe). Since the last 2007 legislative elections, France ranks 58th worldwide and 13th in Europe for women's representation in parliament. Following the last senatorial elections in September 2008, the percentage of female senators increased by six points, from 16% to 22%. The Parliament (National Assembly and Senate) now has nearly 20% female elected representatives.

In 2012, the government of Jean-Marc Ayrault (PS), Prime Minister of François Hollande, is the first to fully respect gender parity. Indeed, since the legislative elections, the National Assembly has 155 women deputies, or 27% of elected representatives, which represents a 33% increase compared to the previous legislature which had 116 women deputies, even if parity is not yet achieved. Following the last Senate elections in September 2011, the percentage of female senators remained the same as in the 2008 elections, at 22%. The Parliament (National Assembly and Senate combined) now has 25% female elected representatives.

That same year, in Paris, at the instigation of polytechnic graduate Julia Mouzon, the "Women & Power" Forum takes place, a conference of women politicians, which for the first time brings together elected women from all over France, to "encourage and inspire women in their political life".

In 2013, the election method for the cantonal election is modified for the next deadlines in 2015: to establish parity in the departmental councils (formerly general councils), each candidacy will be composed of a man-woman tandem eligible as a pair, in a now binominal two-round majority election.

Since the senatorial elections of September 2014, 97 women sit in the Senate, representing 28% of senators.

In 2017, during the last legislative elections, the National Assembly reaches a record number of women: 224, or 39% of deputies.

After the 2022 legislative elections, the number of women deputies experiences a slight decline with a percentage of 37% of elected representatives. But for the first time in the history of the National Assembly, a woman presides over it: Yaël Braun-Pivet. Also noteworthy is the appointment of a woman Prime Minister for the first time in thirty years: Élisabeth Borne.

=== Women mayors and municipal councilors since 1947 ===
Evolution of the percentage of women mayors and municipal councilors since the 1947 municipal elections:

Evolution of the percentage of women mayors and municipal councilors
Year	1947	1953	1959	1965	1971	1977	1983	1989	1995	2001	2008	2014
% of women mayors	0.7%	0.8%	1%	1.1%	1.8%	2.8%	4%	5.5%	7.5%	10.9%	13.9%	16.0%
% of municipal councilors	3.1%	2.9%	2.4%	2.4%	4.4%	8.3%	14%	17.2%	21.7%	33%	34.8%	40.3%

For 2014, under the law of 17 May 2013, the parity rule is lowered from municipalities of 3,500 to those of 1,000 inhabitants and therefore does not apply in the 26,878 least populated municipalities, which still represent 9.5 million French people. In these municipalities, the rate of female candidates is only 35.4% and 17.1% for women heading lists. The number of women mayors rises to 16.0%. The rate of feminization is highest in municipalities with fewer than 3,500 inhabitants (16.3%), then decreases with the size of the municipality; it increases again for municipalities with 100,000 inhabitants or more (14.6%, or 7 women mayors), including for the first time Paris with Anne Hidalgo.

== Gender inequalities ==
If undeniable progress has been made since the second half of the 20th century in women's access to political functions and leadership positions, inequalities remain. For comparison, the 2005–2006 edition of Who's Who in France, which lists people who matter in France, claiming to be based on 4 criteria: "notoriety, honorability, merit, and talent [which] contribute to the activity and influence of France", includes only 11% of women's entries.

=== Politics ===
Despite the 2000 law, French political parties struggle to present as many women as men on their lists, even if it means paying financial penalties. Thus, during the 2002 legislative elections, where the UMP presents 19.7% women on its lists, the UDF 19.9%, the PS and the PRG 34.6%, and the PCF 43.8%, political parties pay a total of 7 million euros in penalties.

In 2010, the share of women elected to the National Assembly is 18.9%, while the European average is 24.15%; for comparison, Sweden has 47%, the Netherlands 41.3%, Finland 40%, Spain 36.6%, Germany 32.8%, Italy 21.3%, the United Kingdom 19.4%, Lithuania 19.1%, and below, Romania 11.4%, Hungary 11.2%, and Malta 8.7%. In 2009, the proportion of women elected in France to the European Parliament is 44.4%, compared to 40.2% in 1999, 21% in 1989, and 22.2% in 1979 (beginning of the Parliament's election by direct universal suffrage). In regional councils, the proportion of women is 48% (902 women) in 2010, compared to 47.6% in 2004, 27.5% in 1998, 12.1% in 1992, and 9% in 1986. In general councils, it is 13.1% (264 women) in 2008, compared to 8.6% in 1998, 4.1% in 1988, 4.3% in 1979, 1.3% in 1970, and 1.1% in 1961. Finally, the proportion of women in municipal councils is 35% in 2008 (181,608 women), compared to 21.7% in 1995, 14% in 1983, 4.4% in 1971, and 2.4% in 1959. In 2006, France ranks 84th worldwide in terms of women elected to the National Assembly and 21st out of the then 25 member countries of the European Union.

While there are 6.8% of women elected deputies in November 1946, there are only 1.4% in 1958, with the trend timidly rising from 1978 (4.3%) to reach 10.9% in 1997 and 19.9% between 2007 and 2011. Part of the decline in this percentage is explained by the decline of the PCF, which then had the habit of presenting many more female candidates in elections, as well as the reluctance of other political parties to present women (whether in the 1978 or 1981 legislative elections, the four right-wing parties presented only 8% female candidates, generally in constituencies that were not very "winnable": "women are most of the time much less numerous than among the candidates"). The decline in the number of women elected from the late 1950s is explained, according to researcher Mariette Sineau, by the institutions of the Fifth Republic: while list elections allowed under the Fourth Republic the election of women not necessarily placed in the first position, the two-round single-member majority voting system of the new legislative rules invites the election of a political personality who embodies elective power, which generally falls, for Mariette Sineau, to local notables, often doctors, lawyers, or notaries, and therefore generally men. If now, the number of women deputies has increased, it remains that the accumulation of mandates and the non-limitation in time of the number of mandates also hinder the renewal of positions, to the detriment of women.

Regional councils are the most feminized parliamentary assemblies in France: from 27.5% in 1998, they are 47.6% in 2004 (including 51.2% in the Martinique), thanks to the parity law of June 2000; although only once at that latter date is a woman at the head of a general council (Ségolène Royal for Poitou-Charentes) and only 19% of electoral lists were led by women. In 2011, there are two women presidents of regional councils (Ségolène Royal, still for Poitou-Charentes, and Marie-Guite Dufay for Franche-Comté). After the 2015 elections, there are 47.8% women elected, three of whom preside over the new regions: Valérie Pécresse (LR) in Île-de-France, Marie-Guite Dufay (PS) in Bourgogne-Franche-Comté, and Carole Delga (PS) in Languedoc-Roussillon-Midi-Pyrénées.

In 2014, the Loi pour l'égalité réelle entre les femmes et les hommes strengthens financial penalties for political parties, and decrees and ordinances of application extend in 2015 the parity measures to ministerial commissions and bodies, then to independent administrative authorities, mutual insurance boards, and professional orders.

=== Public service ===
In 1984, women make up 15% of the staff of ministerial cabinets.

In 2008, women represent 6.5% of general treasurers, 9.9% of prefects, 11% of ambassadors, 16% of heads of establishments who are members of the body of hospital directors, and 19.6% of directors of central administration.

In 2011, the public service has 51.7% women, but they occupy only 20.3% of management positions: thus, only 10% of prefects are women, and 11% of ambassadors.

=== Business ===
==== Statistics ====
In 2009, the average net monthly salary of a man working full-time was 2,240 euros, while that of a woman was 1,834 euros, or a salary 18.1% lower than that of her male colleague.

In 2012, the OECD establishes that in France, the difference in salaries between women and men was almost nil when no children were present in the family, for the 25–44 age group working full-time.

In 2016, the job offers site Glassdoor establishes that for the same position, the difference in salaries between women and men is almost nil (0.4%) when no children are present in the family unit. On the other hand, women who have had at least one child earn 12.4% less than men.

The sectors in which salary gaps between men and women are the highest are financial activities (26.7%), business services (20%), and trade (17.1%). In companies with 10 to 49 employees, the gap is 12.2%, and 18.9% in companies with 2,000 employees or more. In 2006, only 4.5% of women sit on the boards of large companies. In 2011, according to the Ethics & Boards observatory, there are now 20.62% in the companies of the CAC 40. The Copé-Zimmermann Law, adopted in March 2011, imposed on them 20% of women members for 2014. Nevertheless, it is noted that one-third of these female directors are non-French (while for men, only 26.02% are of foreign nationality). Among the members of the SBF 80, still in 2011, there are 14.81% female directors.

In 1982, women represented 24.8% of executives and higher intellectual professions; in 2009, they are 39.6%. In 1965, 22% of journalists were women, compared to 45% in 2009. Nevertheless, there has been an increased feminization of certain professions in recent years, sometimes to the detriment of men. Thus, still in 2009, 54% of doctors under 40 are women. Women also represent 58% of magistrates (77% of those admitted to the School of the Judiciary are women) and half of lawyers. In 1995, Michelle Perrot notes, however, that "70% of women flock to 30% of professions, called feminine, and therefore supposed to be underqualified and poorly paid". According to an OECD report published in December 2012, French women earn 13% less than men, compared to 9.5% in 2000, which shows an increase in the gap between men's and women's incomes. The salary gap widens for families with one or more children, reaching 22%, due to the costs of raising them and a tax system that does not encourage working more. In addition, the report notes that the employment rate of women in France is 60% compared to 68.1% for men (worldwide, it is 56.7% for women and 73% for men). The report notes that reducing this gap would increase GDP by 12% in 20 years, encouraging female employment; it deplores the austerity policies implemented in industrialized countries, with female employees being the first to suffer, in terms of salaries, recruitment, and family policy.

In February 2013, a study by the Governance and Structures firm on the Copé-Zimmermann Law announces that the originally ambitious goal of 20% women on the boards of companies listed on Euronext Paris should be achieved earlier than expected: they were 23.7% in June 2012, compared to 20% a year earlier and 8.5% in 2007. In 2015, they are 34%, which ranks France first in the EU in this area, even if this masks disparities in other management structures of large companies or circumvention strategies to reach this figure (for example, reducing the number of members of a board of directors so that the share of women sitting on it, in the same number, increases).

Since the departure of Anne Lauvergeon from the head of Areva in 2011, no CAC 40 company is led by a woman.

==== Tools ====
In 1983, Yvette Roudy has a law passed that provides for the establishment of a "comparative situation report", which obliges companies to establish a diagnosis of professional equality based on criteria such as salaries or career plans. This system is reinforced in July 2014 by the Loi pour l'égalité réelle entre les femmes et les hommes, then temporarily threatened in 2015 by a bill on social dialogue. Under pressure from the association Osez le féminisme, an amendment to the bill allows this tool to be preserved, which "serves to identify inequalities and define actions to be taken towards equality".

=== Education system ===
In 2011, 58% of graduates in higher education are girls

== Feminist newspapers ==
19th and Early 20th centuries

- La Tribune des femmes
- La Fronde
- La Politique des Femmes

1970s

- Le Torchon brûle
- Le Quotidien des Femmes
- Des femmes en mouvements
- F Magazine

Current

- Osez le féminisme !
- Causette

== See also ==
- Feminism
- Feminism in France
- Women's suffrage in France
- Politics of France

== Bibliography ==
- Pernoud, Régine (1981). La Femme au temps des cathédrales [The Woman in the Time of Cathedrals] (in French). France-Loisirs.
- Michel de Grèce (1988). Louis XIV – L'envers du soleil [Louis XIV – The Other Side of the Sun] (in French). Presses pocket.
- Delsaut, Yvette (1992). La place du maître : une chronique des écoles normales d'instituteurs [The Teacher's Place: A Chronicle of Teachers' Training Schools] (in French). L'Harmattan.
- Bard, Christine (1995). Les filles de Marianne : histoire des féminismes, 1914–1940 [Marianne's Daughters: History of Feminisms, 1914–1940] (in French). Fayard.
- Delwasse, Liliane; Delpech, Frédéric (2006). Quand les femmes prennent le pouvoir [When Women Take Power] (in French). Anne Carrière. p. 268. ISBN 978-2843374050.
- Riot-Sarcey, Michèle (2008). Histoire du féminisme [History of Feminism] (in French). La Découverte.
- Giesbert, Franz-Olivier (2011). "100 idées reçues sur les femmes dans l'Histoire" [100 Misconeptions About Women in History]. Le Point-Historia (in French) (5): 116.
- Guéraiche, William (1995). "Les femmes politiques de 1944 à 1947 : quelle libération ?" [Women Politicians from 1944 to 1947: What Liberation?]. Clio (in French). 1 (1). doi:10.4000/clio.521.
