= Women in the French Senate =

French Senate as of October 2021 Men: 226 seats Women: 122 seats

This article is to share the history and details of women in the French Senate.

== History ==
Women have been able to serve in political office in France since 1944. In 1997, only 5.9% of senators were women. In 2015, 25% of senators were women.

In mid-1999, an amendment was added to the French Constitution mandating gender parity in electoral candidates for senators.

General de Gaulle declared on June 23, 1942, that "all men and women will elect the National Assembly". Marthe Simard and Lucie Aubrac were appointed members of the Provisional Consultative Assembly of Algiers:. From 1944 to 1945, 16 women sat as delegates to this assembly Lucie Aubrac, Madeleine Braun, Gilberte Brossolette, Marie Couette, Claire Davinroy, Andrée Defferre-Aboulker, Alice Delaunay, Martha Desrumaux, Annie Hervé, Marie-Hélène Lefaucheux, Mathilde Gabriel-Péri, Pauline Ramart, Marthe Simard, Marie-Claude Vaillant-Couturier, Marianne Verger, and Andrée Viénot.

In 1946, 6.69% of senators were women, and the percentage decreased until only 1.4% in 1971. As a result of the law of parity, in 2021 women made up a third of the senators.

Women senators since 1946
Election	Number of women	Total number of senators	Percentage
1946	21	314	6.7%
1971	4	283	1.4%
2001	35	321	10.9%
2004	60	331	18.1%
2008	75	343	21.9%
2011	77	348	22.1%
2014	87	348	25.0%
2017	115	348	31.8%
2020	121	348	34.8%

== List of prominent female senators ==
Name	Term	Region	Party
Marthe Simard			Resistance Representative
Lucie Aubrac	1944		Resistance Representative
Jane Vialle	1947–1948	Ubangui-Chari	APEAN; Association for Evolution of Black Africa
Éugénie Éboué	1946–1948	Guadeloupe	Socialist Party, RFP
Jacqueline Alduy	1982–1983	Pyrénées-Orientales	Not Affiliated
Viviane Artigalas	2017–	Hautes-Pyrénées	Socialist Party

== Parliamentary group leaders ==
Years	Senator	Group
1975-1978	Marie-Thérèse Goutmann	Communist, Republican, Citizen and Ecologist group
1979-2001	Hélène Luc	Communist, Republican, Citizen and Ecologist group
2001-2012	Nicole Borvo Cohen-Seat	Communist, Republican, Citizen and Ecologist group
2012-	Éliane Assassi	Communist, Republican, Citizen and Ecologist group
2015-2016	Corinne Bouchoux	Ecologist group
