= Claire Davinroy =

French politician

Member of the Provisional Consultative Assembly
- In office 7 November 1944 – 3 August 1945

Personal details
- Born: Clémence Hortense Aimée Valy; 14 October 1897 Paris, France
- Died: 15 February 1973 (aged 75)
- Occupation: Politician, member of the French Resistance
- Known for: One of the first women to sit in the French Parliament
- Awards: Croix de guerre 1939–1945 with Palme; Resistance Medal

Claire Davinroy (née Clémence Valy; 14 October 1897, in Paris – 15 February 1973) was one of the first women to sit in the French Parliament. She was a French Resistance fighter and a member of the Provisional Consultative Assembly between 1944 and 1945. She was awarded the Croix de guerre 1939-1945 with Palme and the Resistance Medal.

== Biography ==
Davinroy was a professor of higher primary education in Paris. After 1940, she belonged to a resistance group led by Pierre Brossolette. Interned at Fresnes Prison, Davinroy was deported to Ravensbrück concentration camp on 31 January 1944 and was released on 9 April 1945.

After her release she was a delegate to the Provisional Consultative Assembly representing prisoners and deportees. She sat there from 20 July 1945 to 3 August 1945. Later, she was Secretary General of the Former Deportees and Internees of the Resistance (ADIR).

She then became principal of Smith College in Northampton, Massachusetts.

== See also ==
- Women in the French Senate
