= Pierre Viénot =

French politician and member of the French Resistance

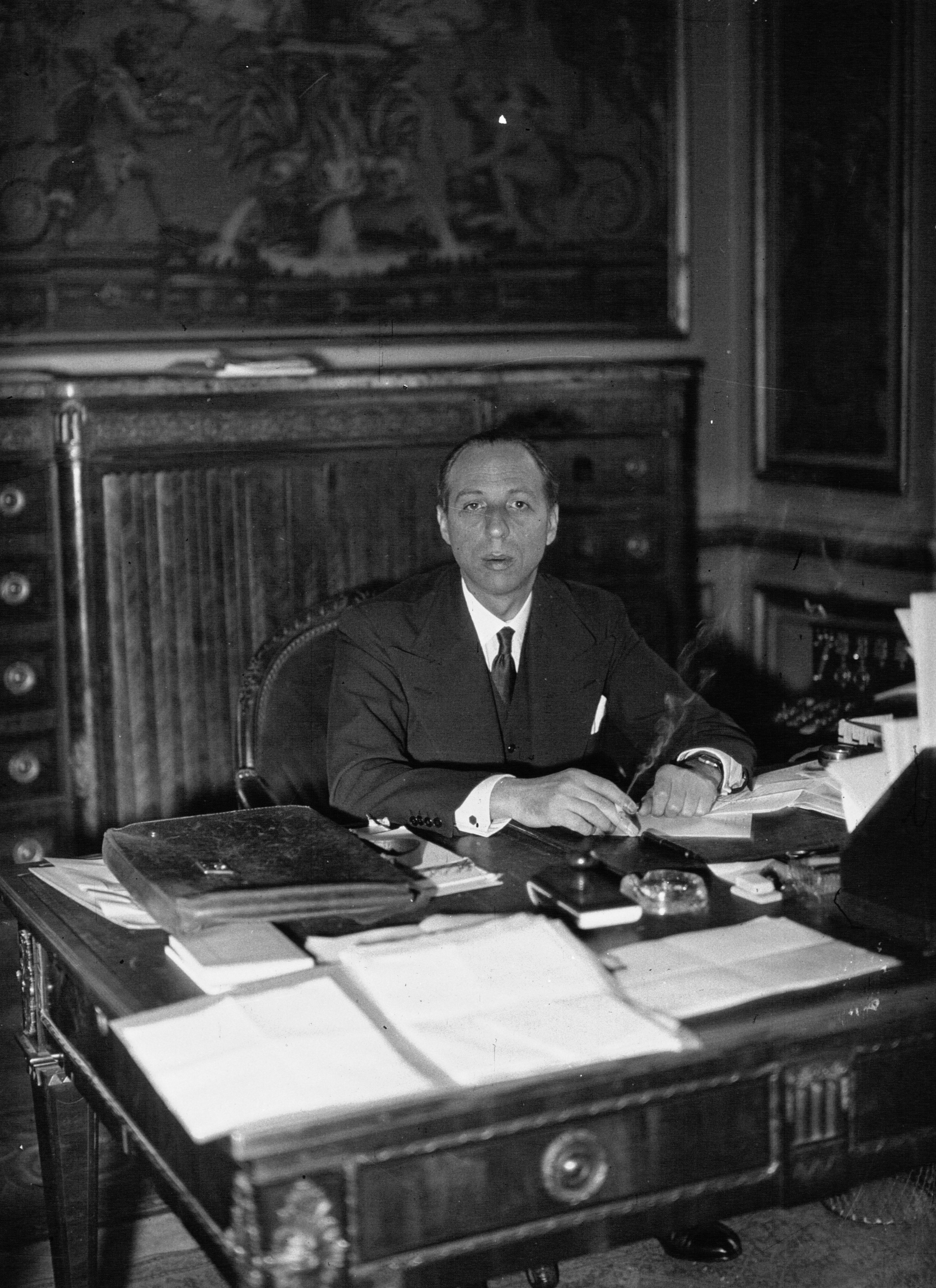
- Pierre Viénot in 1936, while serving as Under-Secretary of State for Foreign Affairs.

Member of the French National Assembly
- In office 1 June 1932 – 31 May 1942
- Preceded by: Firmin Leguet
- Succeeded by: Constituency abolished
- Parliamentary group: PSF-PRS (1932-1935); USR (1935-1937); SOC (1937-1940)
- Constituency: Ardennes

Under-Secretary of State for Foreign Affairs
- In office June 1936 – June 1937
- Prime Minister: Léon Blum
- Succeeded by: François de Tessan

Ambassador of Free France to the United Kingdom
- In office 1943 – 20 July 1944

Personal details
- Born: 5 August 1897
- Died: 20 July 1944 (aged 46)
- Party: PSF (1932-1935); USR (1935-1937); SFIO (1937-1944)
- Spouse: Andrée Mayrisch

Pierre Viénot (5 August 1897 – 20 July 1944) was a French politician and a member of the French Resistance during World War II.

== Early life and career ==
Pierre Louis Gustave Viénot was born in Clermont, Oise. He studied at Lycée Janson-de-Sailly in Paris before enlisting in the French Army during World War I before his eighteenth birthday. He was wounded twice, in the Battle of the Somme (1916) and at Villers-Cotterêts (1918).

After the war, he pursued law studies and worked for Hubert Lyautey, Resident-General of French Morocco. He was influenced by Lyautey's liberal attitudes toward Moroccan governance and later promoted Franco-German relations by founding the Franco-German Committee for Information and Documentation. He married Andrée Viénot, daughter of Luxembourg businessman and patron of the Franco-German committee Émile Mayrisch, in 1929.

== Political career ==
Viénot was elected as a deputy in 1932 representing Rocroi, Ardennes, with the French Socialist Party (PSF). He was re-elected in 1936 and served as under-secretary of state for foreign affairs in the Léon Blum government. He negotiated independence treaties for Lebanon and Syria in 1936, though these were not ratified due to opposition in the French Senate.

In 1938, he opposed the Munich Agreement and co-founded the socialist group "Agir" alongside Pierre Brossolette and Daniel Mayer, advocating resistance against Nazi Germany.

== World War II and Resistance ==
In 1940, Viénot fled France aboard the Massilia but was arrested and placed under surveillance by the Vichy government. Released in 1941, he founded the Socialist Action Committee (CAS) and later joined the French Resistance. He was arrested and detained in 1942 but managed to escape and flee to London.

There, he was appointed ambassador of Free France to the United Kingdom in 1943. He played a key role in ensuring that France would not be governed under Allied Military Government for Occupied Territories (AMGOT) after its liberation but rather by the Provisional Government of the French Republic.

Viénot died of a heart attack in London on 20 July 1944.

== Legacy ==
His wife, Andrée Viénot, later became a government minister and deputy mayor of Rocroi. Pierre Viénot is buried in Chooz, Ardennes.

=== Honors ===
- Chevalier of the Legion of Honour (for World War I service)
- Companion of the Liberation (posthumous, 23 October 1944)
- Croix de Guerre 1914-1918 (two citations)
- Medal for the War Wounded (two wounds)
