= Pauline Ramart =

French chemist and politician (1880–1953)

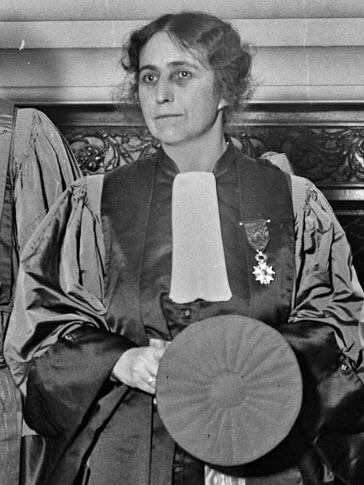
- Pauline Ramart in 1927
- Born: Pauline Lucas; November 22, 1880; 14th arrondissement of Paris
- Died: March 17, 1953 (aged 72); 15th arrondissement of Paris
- Education: University of Paris
- Spouse: Maurice Charles Auguste Ramart
- Children: René Lucas
- Scientific career
- Fields: Chemistry
- Institutions: University of Paris; CNRS

Pauline Ramart, also known as Pauline Ramart-Lucas, (22 November 1880 – 17 March 1953) was a French chemist and politician. Active in organic chemistry, she was the second woman to be appointed as a full professor at the University of Paris, after Marie Curie. As a Jewish women she was dismissed from her teaching post at the Sorbonne during World War II, but became active in the French resistance.

== Early life and education ==
Born on 22 November 1880 in Paris, Pauline Lucas was the daughter of blacksmith René Lucas and his wife Marie Perrine Ceniguar. To support her studies, she sold artificial flowers in the neighbourhood of the Sorbonne. When she was 18, she gave birth to her son Auguste René Lucas on 17 July 1898. He grew up to be a physicist, director of the École supérieure de physique et de chimie industrielles de la ville de Paris, professor of physics at the Faculty of Sciences of the University of Paris and a member of the Academy of Sciences.

On 3 October 1911, Pauline Lucas married the lawyer Maurice Charles Auguste Ramart, born 26 January 1863 and took his surname.

Determined to study, in 1904 she enrolled in evening classes and correspondence courses. After earning her baccalauréat (secondary school diploma), she worked in Albin Haller's laboratory at the Faculté des Sciences. He gave her English lessons and promoted her interest in chemistry. At the age of 29, she earned a licence in physical sciences.

== Career ==
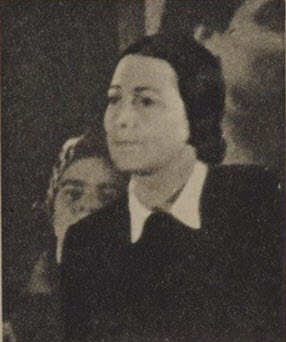
As pictured in Femmes françaises, November 1944

Ramart started her professional career in the laboratory of Albin Haller at the Faculty of Sciences in Paris. She then became a trainer at the Pasteur Institute. In 1913 she earned her doctorate in organic chemistry on the "synthesis of alcohols" from the University of Paris, Sorbonne under the supervision of Haller.

After completing long years of service at the Pasteur Institute, in 1925 Ramart became a lecturer at the Faculty of Sciences, University of Paris, with the support of atomic physicist Jean Perrin. In 1930 she became the second woman to be appointed as a full professor at the University of Paris. The first was Marie Curie.

She was the doctoral advisor of Jean-Pierre Guerlain (1905–1996), nephew of Jacques Guerlain, who defended his thesis on the isomerization of aldehydes in 1931. Guerlain will later become director of the family perfume house Guerlain and oversaw its international expansion.

At the start of World War II, Ramart was research director at the French National Centre for Scientific Research, where she studied the link between UV spectra and chemical reactions for radiology. She received several scientific awards for her work. In 1941, she was dismissed from the Faculty of Sciences by the collaborationist Vichy regime because she was a Jewish woman. She then joined the French Resistance and worked with a group of radiology researchers at the Pasteur Institute. She was one of the first university women to join the resistance and remained active until the liberation. Thereafter she was able to return to her teaching post at the Sorbonne.

Ramart was a nominator for the Nobel Prize in Chemistry from 1940 to 1955.

Ramart was the chair of organic chemistry at the Faculty of Sciences in Paris from 1944 until her death in 1953. A feminist, she was elected to the Free France Provisional Consultative Assembly in 1944, where she campaigned for women's suffrage during her term as the vice-president of the National Education section of the Provisional Consultative Assembly. Women did not receive the right vote in France until 1944, although Marie Denizard had stood unsuccessfully in a Presidential election in 1913.

Ramart died in Paris on 17 March 1953.

== Honours and awards ==
Ramart received several awards and recognition for her contributions to science, including the France’s Legion of Honor, and the Ellen H. Richards Research Prize from the American Association of University Women.

A street in Montpellier was named to commemorate her.

In 2026, Ramart was announced as one of 72 historical women in STEM whose names were proposed to be added to the 72 men already celebrated on the Eiffel Tower. The plan was conceived by a student and tour guide named Bernard Rigaud and the list was announced by the Mayor of Paris, Anne Hidalgo following the recommendations of a committee led by Isabelle Vauglin of Femmes et Sciences and Jean-François Martins, representing the operating company which runs the Eiffel Tower.

== Selected publications ==
See also the OCLC/VIAF full list of publications.

- Contribution à l'étude de l'action des organomagnésiens sur les trialcoylacétophénomes. thèse de doctorat. 1913..
- Notice sur la vie et les travaux de Albin Haller, Paris, Dupont, 1926.
- L'effort créateur des chimistes, Paris, Editions de la Revue politique et littéraire (Revue bleue) et de la Revue scientifique, 1929.
- Rapports et discussions relatifs à la constitution et à la configuration des molécules organiques, Paris, Gauthier-Villars, 1931.
- Relations entre la structure des molécules organiques et leur spectre d'absorption dans l'ultraviolet, Paris, Société chimique de France, 1932.
- Titres et travaux scientifiques de Pauline Ramart-Lucas (1924-1934), Paris, Impressions de la Cour d'Appel, 1934.
- Structure des hétérosides d'après leur absorption dans l'ultraviolet, avec M. J. Rabaté, 1935.
- Traité de chimie organique Tome II, publié sous la direction de Victor Grignard, avec A. Andant et M. Auméras, Paris, Masson, 1936.
- Aperçu de chimie organique, Paris, Hermann, 1937.
