= Madeleine Braun =

French politician (1907–1980)

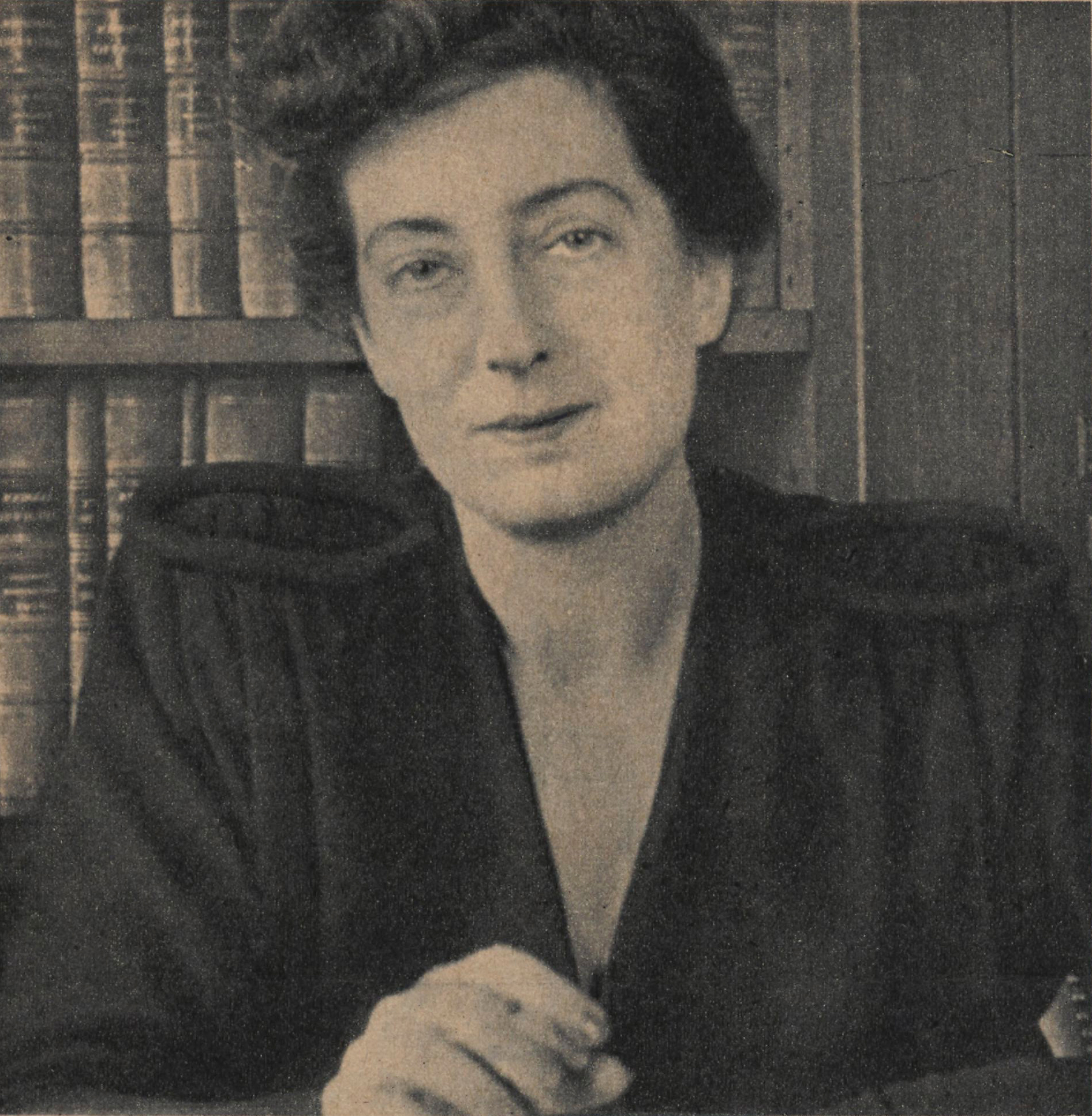
- Photograph of Braun in the magazine Regards. 27 December 1946.

Député
- In office 21 October 1945 – 4 July 1951
- Constituency: Seine

Personal details
- Born: Madeleine Weill; 25 June 1907 Paris
- Died: 22 January 1980 (72 years old) Saint-Cloud
- Party: PCF
- Spouse: Jean Braun
- Parent(s): Albert Weill, Gabrielle Hirsch

Madeleine Braun née Weill (25 June 1907 – 22 January 1980) was a French publisher and politician. She was a Député of the Seine for the Communist Party and, in 1946, she became the first woman vice-president of the National Assembly.

== Family ==
She was the daughter of Albert Weill, a company director, and Gabrielle Hirsch, a painter.

She married Jean Braun, a businessman, on 8 July 1930.

== Biography ==
Madeleine Braun, born Madeleine Weill, studied at the Villiers School and the Faculty of Law in Paris.

She was involved in the Amsterdam-Pleyel Movement, of which she was a member of the executive committee, and the International Coordination and Information Committee for Assistance to Republican Spain, of which she was general secretary between 1936 and 1937.

Engaged in the Resistance, she was responsible for developing in the South zone of the National Front. She was an editor of the Patriot, which she later became director of after the liberation of Lyon. Being a member of the Communist Party and on the executive committee of the National Front, she managed to escape prosecution in 1942.

On 8 November 1944, she was delegated to the Provisional Consultative Assembly. After 1946, she became a member of the assemblies of the Fourth Republic. She was elected vice-president of the National Assembly on 14 June 1946; a role in which she was to chair the sessions and debates along with the other Vice-Presidents. She was the first woman in the history of the Republic to receive this post. She was re-elected four times.

From the Assembly's gallery, she denounced France's famous "Atlanticist" foreign policy, which she believed to be "American imperialism". She did not run for office again in 1951.

From 1961, she directed Éditeurs français réunis (EFR) along with Louis Aragon. She also contributed to Europe, a French literary magazine.

== Distinctions ==
- Resistance Medal
- Knight of the Legion of Honour
- Croix de Guerre 1914–1918 with Palm.

== Tributes ==
- A lane in the 10th arrondissement of Paris is named Place Madeleine-Braun.
