= Caroline Kauffmann =

French feminist activist and suffragette

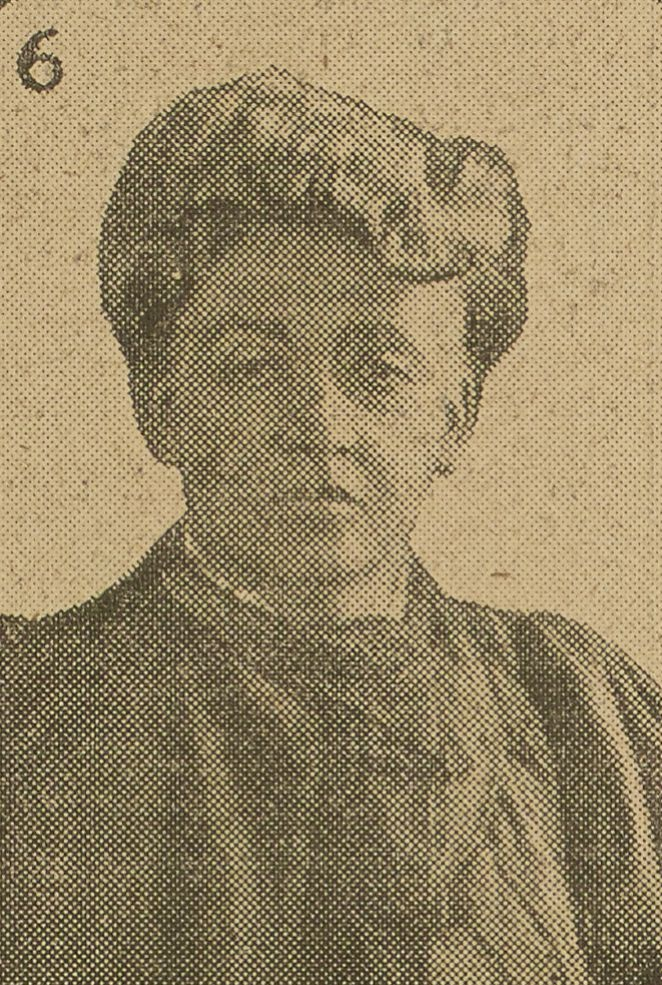
- Born: 1840
- Died: 1926 (aged 85–86); Paris, France
- Occupation: Suffragist

Caroline Kauffmann (née Franck; 1840–1926) was a French feminist activist and suffragette.

From 1898 to 1906, Kauffmann served as general secretary of the socialist-feminist organization, Solidarité des femmes (Women's Solidarity). Under her leadership, the organization evolved into a more staunchly feminist group, focusing more on women's rights and less on socialism and anti-clericalism.

After turning over leadership of Solidarité des femmes to Madeleine Pelletier, Kauffmann became editor of the journal Combat féministe (Feminist Fight) and maintained an active correspondence with the founder of the journal, Aria Ly.

Kauffmann died in 1926 in Paris.

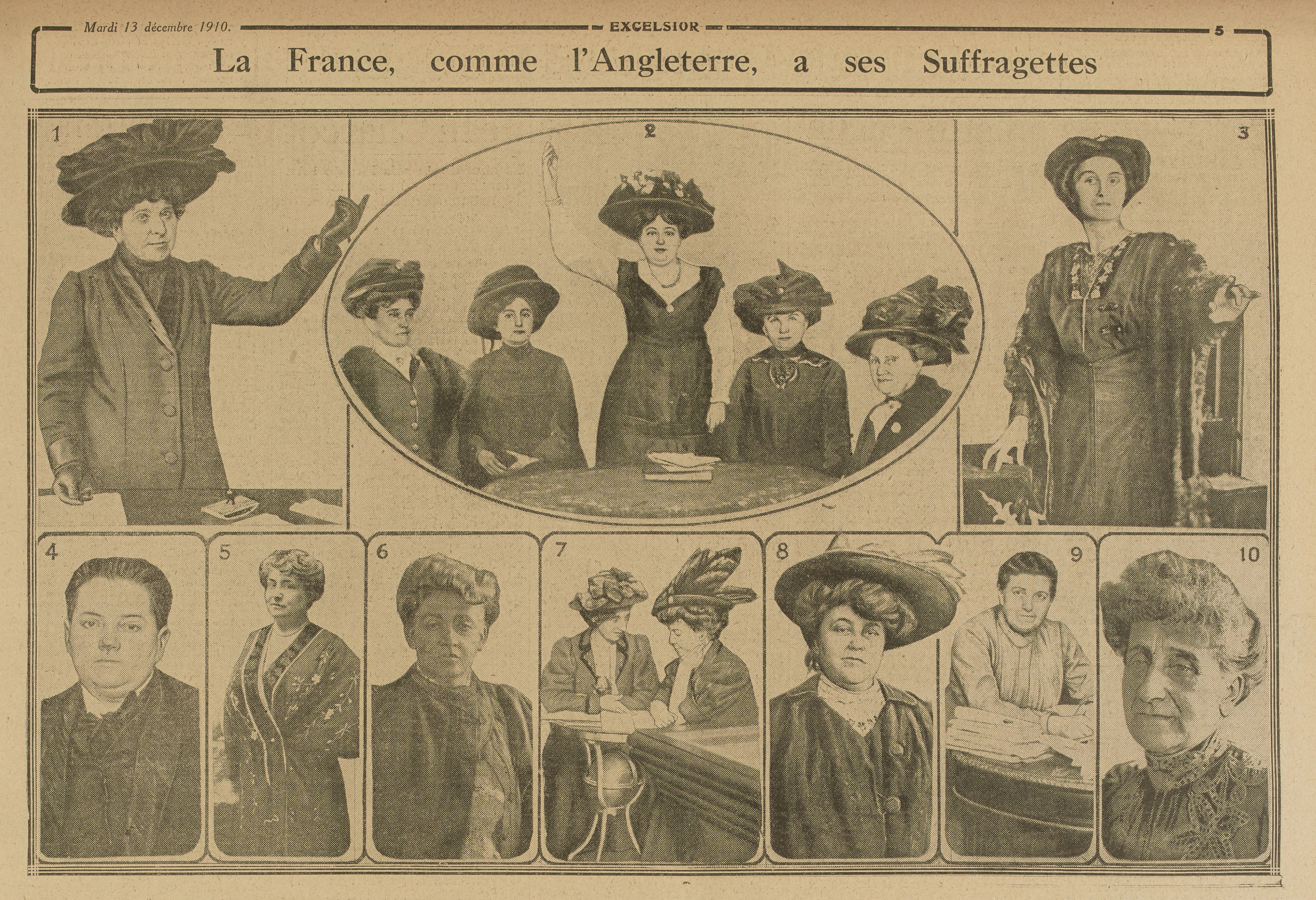
Excelsior - La France, comme l'Angleterre, à ses Suffragettes
