= Marthe Simard =

French politician (1901–1993)

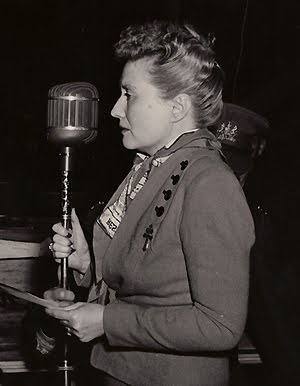
Marthe Simard, 23 August 1944

Marthe Marie Amélie Angèle Simard née Caillaud, later Reid-Simard (6 April 1901, Bordj Menaïel – 28 March 1993), was a Franco-Canadian politician.

Simard was the first French woman to sit in a parliamentary assembly.

In December 1940, she founded the Free France Committee of Quebec.

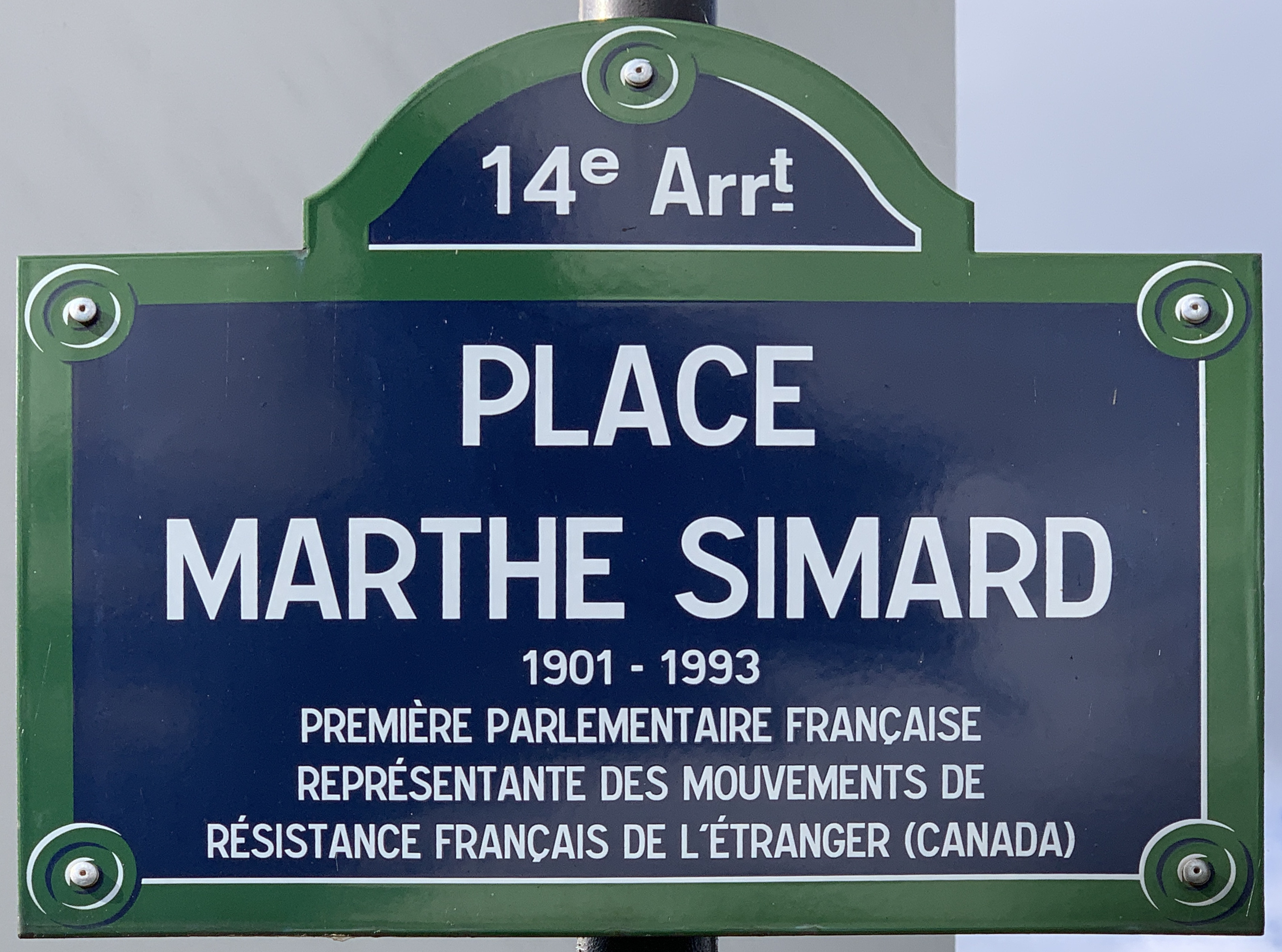
Place Marthe Simard, Paris 14ème

She was a member of the Legion of Honor. Additionally, she was decorated with the Resistance Medal and the Commemorative Medal for Volunteer Services in Free France. To commemorate her, the Place Marthe-Simard in the 14th arrondissement of Paris was named after her.
