= Andrée Viénot =

French politician (1901 – 1976)

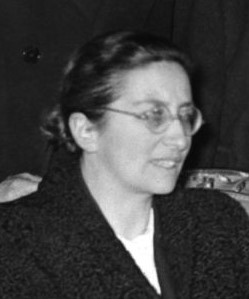
Andrée Viénot

Andrée Viénot (7 June 1901 – 20 October 1976) was a French politician.

== Biography ==
Andrée Viénot was born as Andrée Mayrisch on 7 June 1901 in Dudelange. She studied political economy in London School of Economics. In 18 July 1929 she married Pierre Viénot (1897–1944), who was a war veteran, and became a cabinet minister. She served as the Regional Councilor and the Member of Parliament.

In June 1946 she was nominated by the Christian democrat Georges Bidault of the Popular Republican Movement as Under Secretary of State for Youth and Sports in the Fourth republic.

She was, Martin claims, a “resistance veteran” and held the position of the Mayor of Rocroi.

She died on 20 October 1976 in Charleville-Mézières.
