= Provisional Consultative Assembly =

Governmental organ of Free France

Coordinates: 36.7538°N 3.0588°E

Provisional Consultative Assembly Assemblée consultative provisoire
- French Committee of National Liberation

History
- Established: 3 November 1943
- Disbanded: 3 August 1945

Leadership
- President: Félix Gouin since Ordinance of the French Committee of National Liberation

The Provisional Consultative Assembly (French: Assemblée consultative provisoire, [asɑ̃ble kɔ̃syltativ pʁɔvizwaʁ]) was a governmental organ of Free France that operated under the aegis of the French Committee of National Liberation (CFLN) and that represented the resistance movements, political parties, and territories that were engaged against Germany in the Second World War alongside the Allies.

Established by ordinance on 17 September 1943 by the CFLN, it held its first meetings in Algiers, at the Palais Carnot (the former headquarters of the Financial Delegations), between 3 November 1943 and 25 July 1944. On 3 June 1944, it was placed under the authority of the Provisional Government of the French Republic (GPRF), which succeeded the CFLN. Restructured and expanded after the liberation of France, it held sessions in Paris at the Palais du Luxembourg between 7 November 1944 and 3 August 1945.

== Background ==
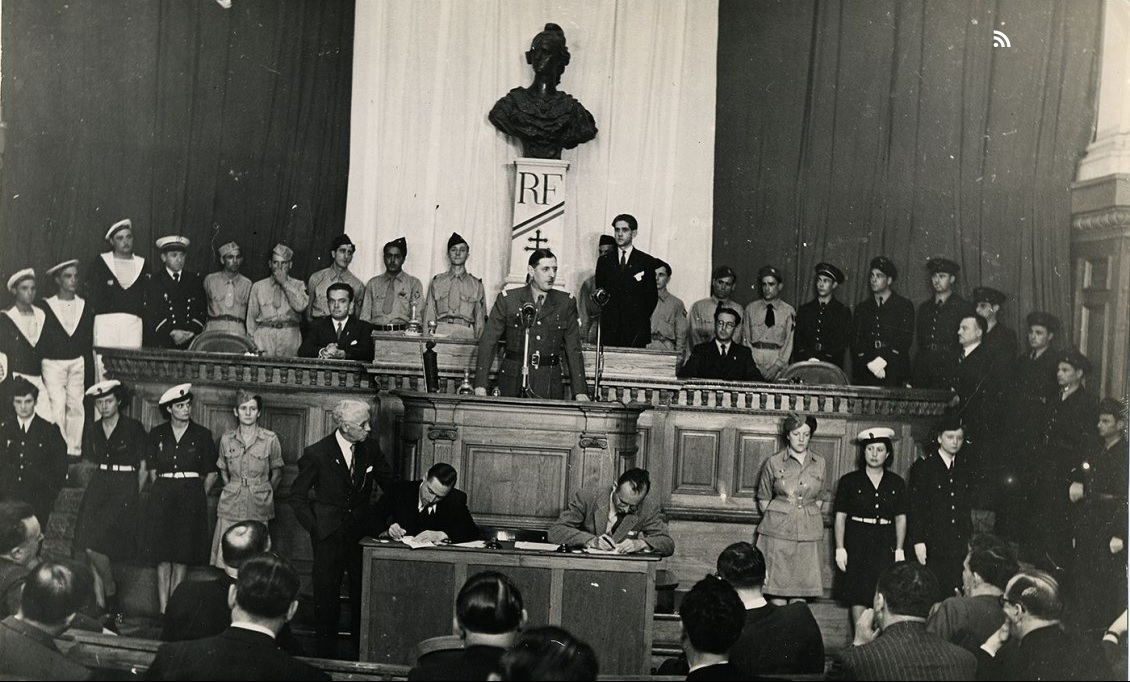
Charles de Gaulle addresses the first session of the Provisional Consultative Assembly in Algiers on 3 November 1943.

In North Africa, where most of the population had been gained at the expense of Pétain and Vichy and where the administration, the army, the censors and the press were full of Pétainists, Charles de Gaulle and the French Committee of National Liberation were frequently challenged by British and American diplomats about their legitimacy as local representatives.

Consequently, it was deemed important to nourish in the colonies the anti-Vichy sentiment which was stifled in France: hostility to the German occupiers and their collaborators. It was necessary to bring out representatives of the resistance and all parties and unions uncompromised by collaborationism.

== Representative body ==
In order to ensure the best possible representation of the French people, four categories of members were assigned as delegates to the Consultative Assembly: delegates from the Resistance in metropolitan France, from the overseas Resistance, from the Senate and the Chamber of Deputies, and from the General Councils of territories of Free France (Algeria and overseas territories). Their numbers were modified over the course of the sessions. The ordinance of 6 December 1943, increased the delegation from 84 to 102 representatives. Lists and directories drawn up according to the minutes of the Assembly registered deaths, as well as new or departing members, which makes it difficult to ascertain the exact number of delegates present in Algiers until July 1944.

After the Provisional Government (GPFR) was transferred to Paris, the number of delegates and the composition of the Consultative Assembly were profoundly modified, in an ordinance of 11 October 1944. (Note: According to Emmanuel Choisnel, 60% of the delegates present in Algiers were seated in Paris.) By an ordinance of 11 October 1944, the number of delegates was fixed at 248; they were seated from 7 November 1944. The ordinance of 22 June 1945 added a fifth category of membership, reserved for prisoners and deportees returning from Germany: 47 members were appointed in July. They were seated for only a short time, the provisional assembly breaking up on 3 August 1945 to make way for the institutional process of electing constituent deputies. At that point the assembly had 295 members. (Note: For the composition of the assembly and modifications see Choisnel (2007); for the list of delegates and their portfolio, see pp. 391-398.)

== Portfolio ==
=== Legislative ===
- Consultations at the initiative of the French Committee of National Liberation (CFLN):
  - The CFLN was required to consult the Assembly on its draft ordinances.
  - The opinions of the Assembly had to be mentioned in the references of the adopted texts.
- Consultations at the initiative of the Assembly (Opinions)
  - The opinions initiated by the assembly, by 2/3 of its members, were to be mentioned in the references of the reform proposals addressed to the CFLN.

=== Political ===
During the interventions of the commissioners (ministers) before the Assembly, it was possible for Assembly members to question and challenge them. In this way, the Assembly created a political pressure center on the committee. Thus, even though it was composed of appointed members and was purely consultative, the assembly demonstrated great independence, as well as a strong capacity for criticism and pressure on the CFLN.

== Entry into service ==
The Consultative Assembly held its first session at the Palais Carnot in Algiers on 3 November 1943. The first consequence of its inauguration was a reconstitution of the French National Liberation Committee (CFLN) on 9 November 1943, taking into account the distribution of the different groups in the Assembly, and also without General Henri Giraud, whose co-presidency of the CFLN had been abolished by an order of 2 October 1943. General de Gaulle was thus in sole control. In this capacity, he addressed the inaugural session of the Assembly.

=== Reestablishment of democratic principles ===
In his speech, de Gaulle gave the body his imprimatur, as providing a means of representing the people of France as democratically and legally as possible under difficult and unparalleled circumstances, until such time as democracy could once again be restored:

It would be futile, in the unprecedented circumstances in which the country finds itself at present, to seek a historical precedent for the creation of the Consultative Assembly, or legislative texts that could provide it with a strictly legal basis. The invasion and occupation destroyed the institutions that France had established for itself. That is why, although democracy can only be restored in its rights and forms in a liberated France, the Committee of National Liberation deemed it necessary, as soon as events permitted, to give to the provisional public authority as democratic a character as possible by calling for a Consultative Assembly to inform and support it, where representatives of the National Resistance stand side by side with elected representatives of the people, all with a qualified mandate.

— Charles de Gaulle, speech to Consultative Assembly, Algiers (3 November 1943)

As an indication of the importance he attached to it, de Gaulle participated in about twenty sessions of the Consultative Assembly in Algiers. On 26 June 1944, he came to report on the military situation after the D-Day landings, and on 25 July, he was present at its last session on African soil before its move to Paris.

== See also ==
- Brazzaville Conference
- Allies of World War II
- Charles de Gaulle
- Clandestine press of the French Resistance
- Collaboration with the Axis Powers during World War II
- Empire Defense Council
- Foreign policy of Charles de Gaulle
- Foreign relations of Vichy France
- French Resistance
- French colonial empire
- French Fourth Republic
- French Third Republic
- German occupation of France
- Liberation of France
- List of French possessions and colonies
- List of governors-general of French Equatorial Africa
- Provisional Government of the French Republic
- Pursuit of Nazi collaborators
- Vichy France
- Zone libre
