= List of feminists =

This list of feminists catalogues notable individuals who identify or have been identified as proponents of feminist political, economic, social, and personal principles for gender equality.

== Early feminists ==
Born before 1499.

Period (birth)	Name	Country	Born	Died	Comments	Source
1200–1300	Helen of Anjou	Serbia	1236	1314	Serbian queen, feminist, establisher of women's schools	
1300–1400	Christine de Pizan	Italy	1365	1430	Medieval court writer	
1300–1400	Jefimija	Serbia	1349	1405	Serbian politician, poet, diplomat	
1400–1499	Laura Cereta	Italy	1469	1499	Humanist and feminist writer	
1400–1499	Balaram Das	India	unknown	unknown	15th century Odia poet; first attempt in India towards feminism	
1400–1499	Isabel de Villena	Spain	1430	1460	Feminist nun	

== 16th-century feminists ==
Born between 1500 and 1599.

Period (birth)	Name	Country	Born	Died	Comments	Source
1500–1599	India Juliana	Present-day Paraguay	fl. 1542	fl. 1542	Guaraní woman who lived in the newly-founded Asunción, known for killing a Spanish colonist between 1538 and 1542 and urging other indigenous women to do the same.	
1500–1599	Heinrich Cornelius Agrippa	Germany	1486	1535	Male feminist, wrote Declamatio de nobilitate et praecellentia foeminei sexus (Declamation on the Nobility and Preeminence of the Female Sex), a book pronouncing the theological and moral superiority of women	
1500–1599	Jane Anger	United Kingdom	fl. 1589	fl. 1589	Protofeminist writer of Jane Anger her Protection for Women	
1500–1599	Marie de Gournay	France	1565	1645	Protofeminist writer of Egalité des hommes et des femmes (The equality of men and women)	
1500–1599	Modesta di Pozzo di Forzi	Italy	1501–1600	c. 1593	Protofeminist writer of The Worth of Women	
1500–1599	Lucrezia Marinella	Italy	c. 1571	1653	Italian poet, author, and an advocate of women's rights	
1500–1599	Izumo no Okuni	Japan	c. 1571	unknown	Originator of kabuki theater	

== 17th-century feminists ==
Born between 1600 and 1699.

Period (birth)	Name	Country	Born	Died	Comments	Source
1600–1699	Mary Astell	United Kingdom	c. 1666	1731	English feminist writer and rhetorician	
1600–1699	Aphra Behn	United Kingdom	1640	1689	Writer and protofeminist	
1600–1699	Anne Bradstreet	United Kingdom	1612	1672	North American colonial poet	
1600–1699	Sophia Elisabet Brenner	Sweden	1659	1724	Writer and women's rights activist	
1600–1699	François Poullain de la Barre	France	1647	1725	Male feminist philosopher	
1600–1699	Sr. Sor Juana Inés de la Cruz	Mexico	1648	1695	Hieronymite nun, scholar and poet	
1600–1699	Ninon de l'Enclos	France	1620	1795	Author, courtesan, and patron of the arts	

== 18th-century feminists ==
Born between 1700 and 1799.

Period (birth)	Name	Country	Born	Died	Comments	Source
1700–1799	Abigail Adams	United States	1744	1818	Wife of John Adams and mother of John Quincy Adams	
1700–1799	Catharina Ahlgren	Sweden	1734	1800	Female Swedish publisher and writer.	
1700–1799	Annestine Beyer	Denmark	1795	1884	Pioneer of women's education	
1700–1799	Eleanor Butler	Ireland	1739	1829	One of the Ladies of Llangollen	
1700–1799	Marquis de Condorcet	France	1743	1794		
1700–1799	Olympe de Gouges	France	1748	1793	Playwright and political activist who wrote the Declaration of the Rights of Woman and of the Female Citizen in 1791	
1700–1799	Anne-Josèphe Théroigne de Méricourt	France	1762	1817	Politician	
1700–1799	Francisco de Miranda, Gen.	Venezuela	1750	1816	Published an impassioned plea for women's education.	
1700–1799	Madeleine de Puisieux	France	1720	1798	Writer	
1700–1799	Dorothea Erxleben	Germany	1715	1762	First female medical doctor in Germany, argued for the right of women to study medicine and other disciplines at university	
1700–1799	Charles Fourier	France	1772	1837	Socialist feminist; philosopher; credited with coining the (French) word "féministe"	
1700–1799	Jane Gomeldon	United Kingdom	c. 1720	1779	Writer and first to use the press to gain power through transparency.	
1700–1799	Sarah Moore Grimké	United States	1792	1873	Suffragist and abolitionist	
1700–1799	Francis Hutcheson	Ireland	1694	1746	Scottish-Irish philosopher, a founding father of the Scottish Enlightenment	
1700–1799	Christian Isobel Johnstone	United Kingdom	1781	1857	Journalist and author in Scotland	
1700–1799	Anne Knight	United Kingdom	1786	1862	Social reformer; pioneer of feminism	
1701–1800	Anna Maria Lenngren	Sweden	1754	1817	Writer, poet, and salonist; possibly a feminist	
1700–1799	Lucretia Mott	United States	1793	1880	Abolitionist and women's rights campaigner	
1700–1799	Judith Sargent Murray	United States	1751	1820	Early American proponent of female equality and author of On the Equality of the Sexes	
1700–1799	John Neal	United States	1793	1876	Writer, critic, and first American women's rights lecturer	
1700–1799	Sarah Ponsonby	Ireland	1755	1831	One of the Ladies of Llangollen	
1700–1799	Mary Shelley	United Kingdom	1797	1851	Early pioneer feminist	
1700–1799	Maria Engelbrecht Stokkenbech	Denmark	1759	after 1806	Dressed as a man to be able to work	
1700–1799	Thomas Thorild	Sweden	1759	1808	Male feminist, poet	
1700–1799	William Thompson (philosopher)	Ireland	1775	1833	Pro-feminist, socialist, collaborator of Anna Wheeler, author of "Appeal of One Half the Human Race, Women, Against the Pretensions of the Other Half, Men, to Retain Them in Political, and thence in Civil and Domestic Slavery", 1825, first published appeal for equality of women	
1700–1799	Sojourner Truth	United States	c. 1797	1883	First-wave feminist; abolitionist, women's rights activist, speaker, women's rights speech "Ain't I a Woman?"	
1700–1799	Anna Wheeler	Ireland	1785	1848	Feminist and socialist writer who networked Robert Owen, Charles Fourier, Henri Saint-Simon, William Thompson (philosopher) and Flora Tristan, Desiree Veret	
1700–1799	Mary Wollstonecraft	United Kingdom	1759	1797	Early pioneer proto-feminist. Author of A Vindication of the Rights of Woman	
1700–1799	Frances Wright	United Kingdom	1795	1852	feminist	

== Early and mid 19th-century feminists ==
Born between 1800 and 1874.

Period (birth)	Name	Country	Born	Died	Comments	Source
1800–1874	Juliette Adam	France	1836	1936		
1800–1874	Jane Addams	United States	1860	1935	Feminist; Women's Suffrage advocate; Major social activist, president Women's International League for Peace and Freedom	
1800–1874	Gertrud Adelborg	Sweden	1853	1942	Teacher and suffragist	
1800–1874	Sophie Adlersparre	Sweden	1823	1895	Publisher; one of three most notable pioneers of women's rights movement in Sweden	
1800–1874	Alfhild Agrell	Sweden	1849	1923		
1800–1874	Soteria Aliberty	Greece	1847	1929		
1800–1874	Jules Allix	France	1818	1897	Socialist; feminist	
1800–1874	Elisabeth Altmann-Gottheiner	Germany	1874	1930	Woman Suffrage	
1800–1874	Ellen Anckarsvärd	Sweden	1833	1898	Co-founded the Married Woman's Property Rights Association	
1800–1874	Adelaide Anderson	United Kingdom	1863	1936		
1800–1874	Elizabeth Garrett Anderson	United Kingdom	1836	1917	Feminist, suffragist; first Englishwoman to qualify as a physician and surgeon in the UK; co-founder of first hospital staffed by women	
1800–1874	Louisa Garrett Anderson	United Kingdom	1873	1943	Suffragette	
1800–1874	Maybanke Anderson	Australia	1845	1927	Suffragette	
1800–1874	Susan Anthony	United States	1820	1906	Woman Suffrage advocate; played a pivotal role in movement to introduce women's suffrage into the United States	
1800–1874	Lovisa Årberg	Sweden	1801	1881	First female doctor in Sweden	
1800–1874	Edith Archibald	Canada	1854	1936	Suffragist; led the Maritime Women's Christian Temperance Union, the National Council of Women of Canada and the Local Council of Women of Halifax	
1800–1874	Concepción Arenal	Spain	1820	1893		
1800–1874	Princess Louise, Duchess of Argyll	United Kingdom	1848	1939	Suffragette	
1800–1874	Ottilie Assing	Germany	1819	1884		
1800–1874	Bibi Khanoom Astarabadi	Iran	1859	1921	Writer	
1800–1874	Louise Aston	Germany	1814	1871		
1800–1874	Hubertine Auclert	France	1848	1914	Feminist activist, suffragette	
1800–1874	Olympe Audouard	France	1832	1890		
1800–1874	Alice Constance Austin	United States	1862	1955	Socialist feminist; radical feminist	
1800–1874	Rachel Foster Avery	United States	1858	1919	First-wave feminist; suffragette	
1800–1874	John Goodwyn Barmby	United Kingdom	1820	1881		
1800–1874	Marie Bashkirtseff	Ukraine	1858	1884	feminist; French feminist	
1800–1874	José Batlle y Ordóñez	Uruguay	1856	1929		
1800–1874	Anna Bayerová	Czech Republic	1853	1924		
1800–1874	Jean Beadle	Australia	1868	1942	Feminist; social worker; political activist	
1800–1874	August Bebel	Germany	1840	1913	Communist; male	
1800–1874	Alaide Gualberta Beccari	Italy	1868	1930	Socialist feminist; radical feminist	
1800–1874	Lydia Becker	United Kingdom	1827	1890	Suffragette	
1800–1874	Catharine Beecher	United States	1800	1878		
1800–1874	Alva Belmont	United States	1853	1933	Suffrage leader; speaker; author	
1800–1874	Louie Bennett	Ireland	1870	1956	Suffrage leader	
1800–1874	Ethel Bentham	United Kingdom	1861	1931	Progressive doctor, politician and suffragette	
1800–1874	Victoire Léodile Béra	France	1824	1900		
1800–1874	Signe Bergman	Sweden	1869	1960		
1800–1874	Annie Besant	United Kingdom	1847	1933	Socialist feminist	
1800-1874	Ottilie von Bistram	German Empire	1859	1931	education campaigner	
1800–1874	Clementina Black	United Kingdom	1853	1922	Feminist, writer, trade unionist	
1800–1874	Alice Stone Blackwell	United States	1857	1950	Feminist and journalist, editor of Woman's Journal, a major women's rights publication	
1800–1874	Antoinette Brown Blackwell	United States	1825	1921	Founded American Woman Suffrage Association with Lucy Stone in 1869	
1800–1874	Elizabeth Blackwell	United States	1821	1910	First-wave feminist	
1800–1874	Henry Browne Blackwell	United States	1825	1909	Businessman, abolitionist, journalist, suffrage leader and campaigner	
1800–1874	Harriot Eaton Stanton Blatch	United States	1856	1940	Suffragist	
1800–1874	Amelia Bloomer	United States	1818	1894	Suffragist, publisher and editor of The Lily, advocated for many women's issues	
1800–1874	Barbara Bodichon	United Kingdom	1827	1891		
1800–1874	Laura Borden	Canada	1861	1940	President of the Local Council of Women of Halifax	
1800–1874	Lily Braun	Germany	1865	1916		
1800–1874	Fredrika Bremer	Sweden	1801	1865	Writer, feminist activist and pioneer of the organized women's rights movement in Sweden	
1800–1874	Ursula Mellor Bright	United Kingdom	1835	1915	Suffragette	
1800–1874	Emilia Broomé	Sweden	1866	1925		
1800–1874	Lady Constance Bulwer-Lytton	United Kingdom	1869	1923	Suffragette	
1800–1874	Katharine Bushnell	United States	1856	1946		
1800–1874	Josephine Butler	United Kingdom	1828	1906		
1800–1874	Pancha Carrasco	Costa Rica	1826	1890		
1800–1874	Frances Jennings Casement	United States	1840	1928	Suffragette	
1800–1874	Carrie Chapman Catt	United States	1859	1947	Suffrage leader, president of the National American Woman Suffrage Association, founder of League of Women Voters and the International Alliance of Women	
1800–1874	Maria Cederschiöld	Sweden	1856	1935	Suffragette	
1800–1874	William Henry Channing	United States	1810	1884	Minister, author	
1800–1874	Mary Agnes Chase	United States	1869	1963	Socialist feminist; suffragist	
1800–1874	Ada Nield Chew	United Kingdom	1870	1945	Suffragette	
1800–1874	Tennessee Celeste Claflin	United States	1844	1923	suffragist	
1800–1874	Alice Clark	United Kingdom	1874	1934		
1800–1874	Helen Bright Clark	United Kingdom	1840	1972	Suffragette	
1800–1874	Florence Claxton	United Kingdom	1840	1879		
1800–1874	Francis Power Cobbe	Ireland	1822	1904		
1800–1874	Mary Ann Colclough	New Zealand	1836	1885	Feminist; social reformer	
1800–1874	Anna "Annie" Julia Cooper	United States	1858	1964	Suffragist	
1800–1874	Marguerite Coppin	Belgium	1867	1931	Woman poet laureate of Belgium and advocate of women's rights	
1800–1874	Ida Crouch-Hazlett	United States	1870	1941	Socialist feminist; suffragist	
1800–1874	Emily Wilding Davison	United Kingdom	1872	1913	Suffragist	
1800–1874	Jenny d'Hericourt	France	1809	1875		
1800–1874	Violante Atabalipa Ximenes de Bivar e Vellasco	Brazil	1817	1875	Editor and publisher of feminist journals in Brazil	
1800–1874	Voltairine de Cleyre	United States	1866	1912	Individualist feminist; anarcha-feminist	
1800–1874	Isabelle Gatti de Gamond	Belgian	1839	1905	Educator, feminist, suffragist, politician	
1800–1874	Augustine De Rothmaler	Belgian	1859	1942	Pedagogue, feminist	
1800–1874	Caroline Rémy de Guebhard	France	1855	1929		
1800–1874	Sibylle Riqueti de Mirabeau	France	1849	1932		
1800–1874	Draga Dejanović	Serbia	1840	1871		
1800–1874	Josefina Deland	Sweden	1814	1890	Writer, teacher, founded Society for Retired Female Teachers	
1800–1874	Maria Deraismes	France	1828	1894		
1800–1874	Jeanne Deroin	France	1805	1894		
1800–1874	Charlotte Despard née French	United Kingdom	1844	1939	Suffragette	
1800–1874	Wilhelmina Drucker	Netherlands	1847	1925	First wave feminist, political activist and writer	
1800–1874	Louisa Margaret Dunkley	Australia	1866	1927	Labour organizer	
1800–1874	Marguerite Durand	France	1864	1936	Suffragette	
1800–1874	Friedrich Engels	Germany	1820	1895	Communist; male	
1800–1874	Emily Faithfull	United Kingdom	1835	1895		
1800–1874	Millicent Garrett Fawcett	United Kingdom	1847	1929	Long-time president of the National Union of Women's Suffrage Societies	
1800–1874	Astrid Stampe Feddersen	Denmark	1852	1930	Chaired the first Scandinavian meeting on women's rights	
1800–1874	Anna Filosofova	Russia	1837	1912	Early Russian woman's rights activist	
1800–1874	Louise Flodin	Sweden	1828	1923		
1800–1874	Mary Sargant Florence	United Kingdom	1857	1954	Suffragette	
1800–1874	Isabella Ford	United Kingdom	1855	1924	Socialist feminist; suffragette	
1800–1874	Margaret Fuller	United States	1810	1850	Transcendentalist, critic, advocate for women's education, author of Woman in the Nineteenth Century	
1800–1874	Matilda Joslyn Gage	United States	1826	1898	Suffragist, editor, writer, organizer	
1800–1874	Marie-Louise Gagneur	France	1832	1902	Feminist writer	
1800–1874	Eliza Gamble	United States	1841	1820	Intellectual and an advocate of the Women's Movement	
1800–1874	William Lloyd Garrison	United States	1805	1879	Abolitionist, journalist, organizer, advocate	
1800–1874	Edith Margaret Garrud	United Kingdom	1872	1971	Trained the 'Bodyguard' unit of the Women's Social and Political Union (WSPU) in jujutsu self-defence techniques	
1800–1874	Désirée Gay	France	1810	1891	Socialist feminist	
1800–1874	Charlotte Perkins Gilman	United States	1860	1935	Ecofeminist	
1800–1874	Wil van Gogh	Netherlands	1862	1941		
1800–1874	Emma Goldman	United Kingdom	1869	1940	Individualist feminist; Russian-American campaigner for birth control and other rights	
1800–1874	Vida Goldstein	Australia	1869	1949	Early Australian feminist politician; first woman in the British Empire to stand for election to a national parliament	
1800–1874	Grace Greenwood	United States	1823	1904	First woman reporter on the New York Times payroll, advocate for social reform and women's rights	
1800–1874	Angelina Emily Grimké	United States	1805	1879	First-wave feminist; Woman Suffrage advocate	
1800–1874	Bella Guerin	Australia	1858	1923	Socialist feminist; first woman to graduate from an Australian university	
1800–1874	Marianne Hainisch	Austria	1839	1936	Proponent of women's right to work and to receive education	
1800–1874	Marion Coates Hansen	United Kingdom	1870	1947	Suffragette	
1800–1874	Jane Ellen Harrison	United Kingdom	1850	1928		
1800–1874	Anna Haslam	Ireland	1829	1922	Major figure in early women's movement in Ireland, founded the Dublin Women's Suffrage Association	
1800–1874	Anna Hierta-Retzius	Sweden	1841	1924	Women's rights activist and philanthropist	
1800–1874	Thomas Wentworth Higginson	United States	1828	1911	Abolitionist, minister, author	
1800–1874	Marie Hoheisel	Austria	1873	1947	Women's rights activist. Chair of Austrian Mothers' Day Committee	
1800–1874	Laurence Housman	United Kingdom	1865	1959	Socialist feminist	
1800–1874	Julia Ward Howe	United States	1819	1910	Suffragist, writer, organizer	
1800–1874	Louisa Hubbard	United Kingdom	1836	1906		
1800–1874	Aletta Jacobs	Netherlands	1854	1929		
1800–1874	Kang Youwei	China	1858	1927		
1800–1874	Abby Kelley	United States	1811	1887	Suffragist and activist	
1800–1874	Grace Kimmins	United Kingdom	1871	1954		
1800–1874	Anna Kingsford	United Kingdom	1846	1888	Ecofeminist	
1800–1874	Toshiko Kishida	Japan	1863	1901		
1800–1874	Evgenia Konradi	Russian Empire	1838	1898	Socialist feminist, writer, essayist	
1800–1874	Lotten von Kræmer	Sweden	1828	1912	Baroness, writer, poet, philanthropist, founder of the literary society Samfundet De Nio	
1800–1874	Marie Lacoste-Gérin-Lajoie	Canada	1867	1945	Suffragette; self-taught jurist	
1800–1874	Louisa Lawson	Australia	1848	1920	Suffragette; radical pro-republican federalist; author and publisher	
1800–1874	Mary Lee	Australia, Ireland	1821	1909	Reformer	
1800–1874	Anna Leonowens	United Kingdom, India	1831	1915	Travel writer, educator, social activist	
1800–1874	Fredrika Limnell	Sweden	1816	1897		
1800–1874	Mary Livermore	United States	1820	1905	Women's rights journalist, suffragist	
1800–1874	Belva Lockwood	United States	1830	1917		
1800–1874	Margaret Bright Lucas	United Kingdom	1818	1890	Suffragette	
1800–1874	Christian Maclagan	United Kingdom	1811	1901		
1800–1874	Kitty Marion	United Kingdom	1871	1944	Socialist feminist; suffragette	
1800–1874	Harriet Martineau	United Kingdom	1802	1876		
1800–1874	Eleanor Marx	United Kingdom	1855	1898	Socialist feminist	
1800–1874	Rosa Mayreder	Austria	1858	1938		
1800–1874	Nellie McClung	Canada	1873	1951	Feminist and suffragist; part of The Famous Five	
1800–1874	Helen Priscilla McLaren	United Kingdom	1851	1934		
1800–1874	Louise Michel	France	1830	1905	anarcha-feminist	
1800–1874	Harriet Taylor Mill	United Kingdom	1807	1858	Early pioneer feminist	
1800–1874	John Stuart Mill	United Kingdom	1806	1873	Early Pioneer	
1800–1874	Hannah Mitchell	United Kingdom	1872	1956	Socialist feminist; suffragette	
1800–1874	Katti Anker Møller	Norway	1868	1945	First-wave feminist	
1800–1874	Agda Montelius	Sweden	1850	1920	Feminist; suffragette; philanthropist, chairman of the Fredrika-Bremer-förbundet	
1800–1874	Anna Maria Mozzoni	Italy	1837	1920	First-wave feminist; suffragette	
1800–1874	Flora Murray	United Kingdom	1869	1923	Suffragette	
1800–1874	Clarina I. H. Nichols	United States	1810	1885	First-wave feminist; suffragist	
1800–1874	Draga Obrenović	Serbia	1864	1903	Queen consort;	
1800–1874	Louise Otto-Peters	Germany	1819	1895		
1800–1874	Emmeline Pankhurst	United Kingdom	1858	1928	Suffragette; one of the founders and the leader of the British suffragette movement	
1800–1874	Maud Wood Park	United States	1871	1955	Founder College Equal Suffrage League, first president League of Women Voters	
1800–1874	Madeleine Pelletier	France	1874	1939	French feminist; First-wave feminist; Socialist feminist	
1800–1874	Gabrielle Petit	France	1860	1952	feminist activist, anticlerical, libertarian socialist	
1800–1874	Wendell Phillips	United States	1811	1884	Abolitionist, orator, lawyer	
1800–1874	Jyotiba Phule	India	1827	1890	Critic of the caste system, founded a school for girls, a widow-remarriage initiative, a home for upper caste widows, and a home for infant girls to discourage female infanticide	
1800–1874	Eugénie Potonié-Pierre	France	1844	1898		
1800–1874	Eleanor Rathbone	United Kingdom	1872	1946		
1800–1874	Élisabeth Renaud	France	1846	1932	Co-founder Groupe Feministe Socialiste	
1800–1874	Dorothy Richardson	United Kingdom	1873	1957		
1800–1874	Edith Rigby	United Kingdom	1872	1948	Suffragette	
1800–1874	Bessie Rischbieth	Australia	1874	1967)	Earliest female appointed to any court; early activist against the practice of taking Aboriginal children from their mothers	
1800–1874	Eliza Ritchie	Canada	1856	1933	Prominent suffragist, executive member of the Local Council of Women of Halifax	
1800–1874	Harriet Hanson Robinson	United States	1825	1911		
1800–1874	Pauline Roland	France	1805	1852		
1800–1874	Rosalie Roos	Sweden	1823	1898	Writer and pioneer of the organized women's rights movement in Sweden	
1800–1874	Ernestine Rose	United States, Russia-Poland	1810	1892	Suffragette	
1800–1874	Hilda Sachs	Sweden	1857	1935	Journalist, writer and feminist	
1800–1874	George Sand	France	1804	1876	Early pioneer feminist	
1800–1874	Anna Sandström	Sweden	1854	1931	Educational reformer	
1800–1874	Auguste Schmidt	Germany	1833	1902		
1800–1874	Olive Schreiner	South Africa	1855	1920		
1800–1874	Rose Scott	Australia	1847	1925	Suffragette	
1800–1874	Anna Howard Shaw	United States	1847	1919	President of National Women's Suffrage Association 1904–1915	
1800–1874	Kate Sheppard	New Zealand	1848	1934	Influential in winning voting rights for women in 1893 (the first country and national election in which women were allowed to vote)	
1800–1874	Tarabai Shinde	India	1850	1910		
1800–1874	Emily Anne Eliza Shirreff	United Kingdom	1814	1897	Early pioneer feminist	
1800–1874	Eleanor Mildred Sidgwick	United Kingdom	1845	1936		
1800–1874	Dame Ethel Mary Smyth	United Kingdom	1858	1944	Suffragette	
1800–1874	Anna Garlin Spencer	United States	1851	1931		
1800–1874	Elizabeth Cady Stanton	United States	1815	1902	Social activist, abolitionist, suffragist, organizer of the 1848 Women's Rights Convention, co-founder of the National Woman Suffrage Association and the International Council of Women	
1800–1874	Anna Sterky	Sweden, Denmark	1856	1939		
1800–1874	Helene Stöcker	Germany	1869	1943		
1800–1874	Milica Stojadinović-Srpkinja	Serbia	1828	1878	Feminist; war correspondent; writer; poet	
1800–1874	Lucy Stone	United States	1818	1893	Orator, organizer of the first National Women's Rights Convention, founder of the Woman's Journal, and first recorded American woman to retain her surname after marriage	
1800–1874	Emily Howard Stowe	Canada	1831	1903	Physician, advocate for women's inclusion in the medical professional community, founder of the Canadian Women's Suffrage Association	
1800–1874	Helena Swanwick	United Kingdom	1864	1939	Suffragette	
1800–1874	Frances Swiney	United Kingdom	1847	1922	Suffragette	
1800–1874	Táhirih	Iran	1814/17	1852	Bábí poet, theologian, and proponent of women's rights in 19th-century Iran	
1800–1874	Caroline Testman	Denmark	1839	1919	Co-founder of the Dansk Kvindesamfund	
1800–1874	Martha Carey Thomas	United States	1857	1935		
1800–1874	Sybil Thomas, Viscountess Rhondda	United Kingdom	1857	1941	Suffragette	
1800–1874	Flora Tristan	France	1803	1844	Socialist feminist	
1800–1874	Harriet Tubman	United States	1820	1913	First-wave feminist	
1800–1874	Thorstein Veblen	United States	1857	1929	Economist; sociologist; male	
1800–1874	Alice Vickery	United Kingdom	1844	1929	Physician, supporter of birth control as means of emancipation of women	
1800–1874	Beatrice Webb	United Kingdom	1858	1943	Socialist feminist	
1800–1874	Ida B. Wells	United States	1862	1931	Civil rights and anti-lynching activist, suffragist noted for her refusal to avoid media attention because she was African American	
1800–1874	Anna Whitlock	Sweden	1852	1930	Feminist, suffragette; school pioneer, journalist	
1800–1874	Karolina Widerström	Sweden	1856	1949	Suffragette	
1800–1874	Frances Willard	United States	1839	1898	Suffragist and organizer, Socialist feminist; suffragette	
1800–1874	Charlotte Wilson	United Kingdom	1854	1944	radical feminist	
1800–1874	Victoria Woodhull	United States	1838	1927	First-wave feminist; suffragist, organizer, innovator, first woman to run for U.S. presidency	
1800–1874	Frederick Douglass	United States	c. 1818	1895	Male suffragist	
1800–1874	Caroline Kauffmann	France	c. 1840s	1924		
1800–1874	Natalie Zahle	Denmark	1827	1913	Working for women's right to education.	
1800–1874	Puah Rakovsky	Poland - Israel	1865	1955	Empowerment of women	

== Late 19th-century and early 20th-century feminists ==
Born between 1875 and 1939.

Period (birth)	Name	Country	Born	Died	Comments	Source
1875–1939	Bella Abzug	United States	1920	1998	Second-wave feminist	
1875–1939	Ángela Acuña Braun	Costa Rica	1888	1983		
1875–1939	Madeleine Albright	United States, Czechoslovakia	1937	2022	64th United States Secretary of State, and at the time, the highest ranking woman in US history. She is a staunch supporter of the feminist cause.	
1875–1939	Wim Hora Adema	Netherlands	1914	1998	Second-wave feminist; radical feminist	
1875–1939	Anna Caspari Agerholt	Norway	1892	1943	Educator on women's rights with Norwegian National Women's Council, women's movement historian	
1875–1939	Alan Alda	United States	1936	–		
1875–1939	Dolores Alexander	United States	1931	2008	Anti-pornography feminist	
1875–1939	Maya Angelou	United States	1928	2014	Civil rights activist	
1875–1939	June Arnold	United States	1926	1982	Writer, second-wave feminist	
1875–1939	Margery Corbett Ashby	United Kingdom	1882	1981	Suffragette	
1875–1939	Ksenija Atanasijević	Serbia	1894	1981	Suffragette; philosopher; first PhD in a Serbian university	
1875–1939	Ti-Grace Atkinson	United States	1938	–	Second-wave feminist	
1875–1939	Margaret Atwood	Canada	1939	–	Third-wave feminist	
1875–1939	Helene Aylon	United States	1931	2020	Ecofeminist	
1875–1939	Eva Bacon	Australia	1909	1994	Feminist and Socialist	
1875–1939	Margot Badran	Australia	1936	-	Writer on Islamic feminism	
1875–1939	Faith Bandler	Australia	1918	2015	Feminist and civil rights activist	
1875–1939	Lois W. Banner	United States	1939	–		
1875–1939	Thelma Bate	Australia	1904	1984	Community leader, advocate for inclusion of Aboriginal women in Country Women's Association	
1875–1939	Rosalyn Baxandall	United States	1939	2015	Second-wave feminist; radical feminist; New York Radical Women	
1875–1939	Mary Ritter Beard	United States	1876	1958	Feminist; historian	
1875–1939	Joan Beauchamp	United Kingdom	1890	1964	Suffragette	
1875–1939	Kay Beauchamp	United Kingdom	1899	1992		
1875–1939	Simone de Beauvoir	France	1908	1986	Second-wave feminist; philosopher; writer	
1875–1939	Helen Bentwich	United Kingdom	1892	1972		
1875–1939	Ione Biggs	United States	1916	2005	Advocate for human rights and world peace	
1875–1939	Rosa May Billinghurst	United Kingdom	1875	1953	Suffragette	
1875–1939	Teresa Billington-Greig	United Kingdom	1877	1964	Suffragette	
1875–1939	Dorothy Lee Bolden	United States	1923	2002	Trade unionist	
1875–1939	Dulce María Borrero	Cuba	1883	1945	Poet and journalist, described as "one of the leading feminists of her day"	
1865–1964	Jeanne Bouvier	France	1865	1964	Feminist; trade unionist	
1875–1939	Elsie Bowerman	United Kingdom	1889	1973	Suffragette	
1875–1939	Helen Gurley Brown	United States	1922	2012	Author of Sex and the Single Girl, long-time editor of Cosmopolitan	
1875–1939	Stella Browne	Canada	1880	1955	Socialist feminist	
1875–1939	Susan Brownmiller	United States	1935	2025	Second-wave feminist; anti-pornography feminist; radical feminist	
1875–1939	Katherine Burdekin	United Kingdom	1896	1963		
1875–1939	Lucy Burns	United States	1879	1966	Suffragette; suffragist and women's rights activist	
1875–1939	Karlyn Kohrs Campbell	United States	1937	2024		
1875–1939	Clara Campoamor	Spain	1888	1972	Suffragette, politician	
1875–1939	Luisa Capetillo	Puerto Rico	1879	1922	Puerto Rican labor union suffragette; jailed for wearing pants in public	
1875–1939	Liz Carpenter	United States	1920	2010		
1875–1939	Elvia Carrillo Puerto	Mexico	1878	1967		
1875–1939	Florence Fernet-Martel	Canada	1892	1986	Second-wave feminist; suffragette; educator, mostly active in Quebec	
1875–1939	Thérèse Casgrain	Canada	1896	1981	Second-wave feminist; suffragette; politician and senator, mostly active in Quebec	
1875–1939	Jacqueline Ceballos	United States	1925	–	Founder of Veteran Feminists of America	
1875–1939	Enid Charles	United Kingdom	1894	1972	Radical feminist	
1875–1939	Shirley St Hill Chisholm	United States	1924	2005	Second-wave feminist	
1875–1939	Hélène Cixous	France	1937	–		
1875–1939	Margaret "Gretta" Cousins	Ireland	1878	1954	Irish-Indian suffragist, established All India Women's Conference, co-founded Irish Women's Franchise League	
1875–1939	Eva Cox	Australia	1938	–	Sociologist; long-time member of the Women's Electoral Lobby	
1875–1939	Jill Craigie	United Kingdom	1911	1999	Socialist feminist	
1875–1939	Minnie Fisher Cunningham	United States	1882	1964		
1875–1939	Thelma Dailey-Stout	United States	1918	2005	Civil rights activist and organizer	
1875–1939	Hamid Dalwai	India	1932	1977	Socialist feminist	
1875–1939	Mary Daly	United States	1928	2010	Second-wave feminist; Ecofeminist	
1875-1939	Hedy d'Ancona	Netherlands	1937	-	Second-wave feminist, co-founder of Man Vrouw Maatschappij, sociologist, Minister of Health, Welfare and Culture (1989-1994), senator	
1875–1939	Sonja Davies	New Zealand	1923	2005	Second-wave feminist	
1875–1939	Alicia Moreau de Justo	Argentina	1885	1986	Socialist feminist	
1875–1939	Agnes de Silva	Sri Lanka	1885	1961	Pioneered women's suffrage issues in Sri Lanka.	
1875–1939	Ana María Pérez del Campo	Spain	1936		Lawyer, feminist and writer, divorce law	
1875–1939	Barbara Deming	United States	1917	1984		
1875–1939	Ezlynn Deraniyagala	Sri Lanka	1908	1973		
1875–1948	Zoraida Díaz	Panama	1881	1948	Poet, educator, founding member of Panama's first feminist organization	
1875–1939	Betty Dodson	United States	1929	2020	Third-wave feminist; sex-positive feminist	
1875–1939	Sediqeh Dowlatabadi	Iran	1882	1962	Journalist and women's rights activist	
1875–1939	Carol Downer	United States	1933	2025	Second-wave feminist; founder of women's self-help movement, feminist, author, health activist, attorney	
1875–1939	Roxanne Dunbar-Ortiz	United States	1938	–	Radical feminist	
1875–1939	Crystal Eastman	United States	1881	1928	Socialist feminist	
1875–1939	Françoise d'Eaubonne	France	1920	2005	Ecofeminist	
1875–1939	Esther Eillam	Israel	1939	2023	Second-wave feminist, Mizrahi feminist, major founder of Israel's feminist movement	
1875–1939	Norah Elam	United Kingdom, Ireland	1878	1961	Radical feminist; suffragette	
1875–1939	Cynthia Enloe	United States	1938	–	Second-wave feminist	
1875–1939	Mohtaram Eskandari	Iran	1895	1924	Woman's rights activist, founder of "Jam'iat e nesvan e vatan-khah" (Society of Patriotic Women	
1875–1939	Vilma Espín	Cuba	1930	2007		
1875–1939	Elizabeth Evatt	Australia	1933	–	Legal reformist and juror; first Australian to be elected to the United Nations Human Rights Committee	
1875–1939	Myrlie Evers-Williams	United States	1933	–	Second-wave feminist	
1875–1939	Leonora Eyles	United Kingdom	1889	1960	Author, "agony aunt"	
1875–1939	Lidia Falcón	Spain	1935	–		
1875–1939	Frances Farrer	United Kingdom	1895	1977		
1875–1939	Geraldine Ferraro	United States	1935	2011		
1875–1939	Ana Figuero	Chile	1908	1970		
1875–1939	Marianne Githens	United States	1936	2018	Political scientist, author	
1875–1939	Elizabeth Gurley Flynn	United States	1890	1964	Socialist feminist; suffragette	
1875–1939	Elizabeth "Betty" Bloomer Ford	United States	1918	2011	Second-wave feminist	
1875–1939	Gerald Ford	United States	1913	2006	Second-wave feminist	
1875–1939	Miles Franklin	Australia	1879	1954	Feminist; writer	
1875–1939	Clara Fraser	United States	1923	1998	Second-wave feminist; radical feminist	
1875–1939	Elisabeth Freeman	United States	1876	1942	Suffragist and civil rights activist, participated in the Suffrage Hikes	
1875–1939	Marilyn French	United States	1929	2009	Second-wave feminist; radical feminist	
1875–1939	Betty Friedan	United States	1921	2006	Second-wave feminist; writer	
1875–1939	Carol Gilligan	United States	1936	–	Second-wave feminist	
1875–1939	Françoise Giroud	France	1916	2003	Journalist, writer, politician	
1875–1939	Judy Goldsmith	United States	1938	–	President of the National Organization for Women (NOW) from 1982 to 1985	
1875–1939	Jane Goodall	United Kingdom	1934	2025		
1875–1939	Vivian Gornick	United States	1935	–	Radical feminist	
1875–1939	Lois Gould	United States	1931	2002		
1875–1939	Jane Grant	United States	1892	1972		
1875–1939	Germaine Greer	Australia	1939	–	Second-wave feminist, author of The Female Eunuch	
1875–1939	Colette Guillaumin	France	1934	2017		
1875–1939	Tahar Haddad	Tunisia	1897	1935	Muslim feminist	
1875–1939	Lizzy Lind af Hageby	Sweden	1878	1963		
1875–1939	Charlotte Haldane	United Kingdom	1894	1969		
1875–1939	Gisèle Halimi	France	1927	2020		
1875–1939	Zaib-un-Nissa Hamidullah	India	1921	2000	Muslim feminist	
1875–1939	Bertha Harris	United States	1937	2005	Second-wave feminist	
1875–1939	Caroline Haslett	United Kingdom	1895	1957		
1875–1939	He Xiangning	China	1878	1972	Revolutionary, feminist	
1875–1939	Dorothy Hewett	Australia	1923	2002	Second-wave feminist	
1875–1939	Nicole Hollander	United States	1939	–		
1875–1939	Pak Hon-yong	South Korea	1900	1956		
1875–1939	Mary Howell	United States	1932	1998		
1875–1939	Edith How-Martyn	United Kingdom	1875	1954	Suffragette	
1875–1939	Fatima Ahmed Ibrahim	Sudan	1933	2017	Muslim feminist	
1875–1939	Fusae Ichikawa	Japan	1893	1981		
1875–1939	Luce Irigaray	France	1930	–		
1875–1939	Josephine Irwin	United States	1890	1984	Suffragist and educator	
1875–1939	Selma James	United States, United Kingdom	1930	–	Social activist, co-founder of International Wages for Housework Campaign	
1875–1939	Sonia Johnson	United States	1936	–		
1875–1939	Jill Johnston	United States	1929	2010		
1875–1939	Claudia Jones	United Kingdom, United States, Trinidad and Tobago	1915	1964	Marxist feminist	
1875–1939	Rosalie Gardiner Jones	United States	1883	1978	Suffragette. Organizer of the Suffrage Hikes	
1875–1939	Alice Jouenne	France	1873	1954	First-wave feminist	
1875–1939	Marie Juchacz	Germany	1879	1956		
1875–1939	Raden Adjeng Kartini	Indonesia	1879	1904	Muslim feminist; Javanese advocate for native Indonesian women, critic of polygamous marriages and lack of education opportunities for women	
1875–1939	Shidzue Katō	Japan	1897	2001	Second-wave feminist	
1875–1939	Joséphine Nyssens Keelhoff	Belgium	1833	1917	Feminist, women's rights activist	
1875–1939	Aoua Kéita	Mali	1912	1980		
1875–1939	Florynce Kennedy	United States	1916	2000	Second-wave feminist	
1875–1939	Annie Kenney	United Kingdom	1879	1953	Suffragette	
1875–1939	Yamakawa Kikue	Japan	1890	1980	Socialist feminist; anti-prostitution feminist	
1875–1939	Coretta Scott King	United States	1927	2006	Second-wave feminist	
1875–1939	Cheris Kramarae	United States	1938	-	Feminist scholar	
1875–1939	Mabel Ping-Hua Lee	United States	1896	1966	Suffragist; first Chinese woman to earn a PhD from Columbia University	
1875–1939	Gerda Lerner	Austria	1920	2013		
1875–1939	Audre Lorde	United States	1934	1992	Third-wave feminist	
1875–1939	Mina Loy	United Kingdom	1882	1966		
1875–1939	Rae Luckock	Canada	1893	1972	Socialist feminist	
1875–1939	Margaret Mackworth, 2nd Viscountess Rhondda	United Kingdom	1883	1958	Suffragette	
1875–1939	Agnes Macphail	Canada	1890	1954		
1875–1939	Dora Marsden	United Kingdom	1882	1960		
1875–1939	Elizabeth Holloway Marston	United Kingdom	1893	1993		
1875–1939	William Moulton Marston	United States	1893	1947		
1875–1939	Nicole-Claude Mathieu	France	1937	2014	Empress French feminist; material feminist	
1875–1939	Else Mayer	Germany	1891	1962	First-wave feminist	
1875–1939	Antonia Maymón	Spain	1881	1959		
1875–1939	Carolyn Merchant	United States	1936	–	Ecofeminist	
1875–1939	Maria Mies	Germany	1931	2023	Ecofeminist; professor of sociology and author	
1875–1939	Inez Milholland	United States	1886	1916	Key participant in the National Woman's Party and the Woman Suffrage Parade of 1913	
1875–1939	Kate Millett	United States	1934	2017	Second-wave feminist	
1875–1939	Laure Moghaizel	Lebanon	1929	1997	Lebanese lawyer and women's rights advocate	
1875–1939	Florence Nagle	United Kingdom	1894	1988	Feminist; first woman in Britain to officially train racehorses.	
1875–1939	Diane Nash	United States	1938	–	1960s Civil Rights Movement leader and organizer, voting rights proponent	
1875–1939	Malak Hifni Nasif	Egypt	1886	1918	Feminist writer	
1875–1939	Anaïs Nin	United States, France	1903	1977		
1875–1939	Helena Normanton	United Kingdom	1882	1957		
1875–1939	Alexis Nour	Romania	1877	1940		
1875–1939	Yoko Ono	United States, Japan	1933	–		
1875–1939	Alicia Ostriker	United States	1937	–	Third-wave feminist	
1875–1939	Grace Paley	United States	1922	2007		
1875–1939	Adela Pankhurst	United Kingdom	1885	1961		
1875–1939	Christabel Pankhurst	United Kingdom	1880	1958	Suffragette; co-founder and leader of the Women's Social and Political Union	
1875–1939	Sylvia Pankhurst	United Kingdom	1882	1960	Suffragette	
1875–1939	Frances Parker	United Kingdom	1875	1924		
1875–1939	Alice Paul	United States	1885	1977	One of the leaders of the 1910s Women's Voting Rights Movement for the 19th Amendment; founder of National Woman's Party, initiator of the Silent Sentinels and the 1913 Women's Suffrage Parade, author of the proposed Equal Rights Amendment	
1875–1939	Eva Perón	Argentina	1919	1952		
1875–1939	Frédérique Petrides	United States, Belgium	1903	1983	Feminist; pioneering orchestral conductor, activist and editor of Women in Music, a series of periodicals chronicling the activities of women in music	
1875–1939	Marion Phillips	United Kingdom	1881	1932	Suffragette	
1875–1939	Sylvia Plath	United States	1932	1963		
1875–1939	Val Plumwood	Australia	1939	2008	Ecofeminism	
1875–1939	Letty Cottin Pogrebin	United States	1939	–		
1875–1939	Eileen Powell	Australia	1913	1997	Trade unionist, women's activist and important contributor to the Equal Pay for Equal Work decision	
1875–1939	Millicent Preston-Stanley	Australia	1883	1955	First female member of the NSW Legislative Assembly; campaigned for the custodial rights of mothers in divorce and women's healthcare	
1875–1939	Lorine Livingston Pruette	United States	1896	1977		
1875–1939	Funmilayo Ransome-Kuti	Nigeria	1900	1978	Foremost Nigerian women's rights activist	
1875–1939	Claire Rayner	United Kingdom	1931	2010		
1875–1939	Adrienne Rich	United States	1929	2012		
1875–1939	Mary Richardson	United Kingdom	1889	1961	Suffragette	
1875–1939	Léa Roback	Canada	1903	2000	Feminist; workers' union activist tied with the communist party	
1875–1939	Hilary Rose	United Kingdom	1935	–		
1875–1939	Agnes Maude Royden	United Kingdom	1876	1956	Suffragette	
1875–1939	Florence Rush	United States	1918	2008		
1875–1939	Joanna Russ	United States	1937	2011	Second-wave feminist	
1875–1939	Diana E. H. Russell	South Africa	1938	2020	Second-wave feminist; radical feminist;anti-pornography feminist	
1875–1939	Dora Russell	United Kingdom	1894	1986	Feminist; progressive campaigner, advocate of marriage reform, birth control and female emancipation	
1875–1939	Manuel Sacristán	Spain	1925	1985	Socialist feminist	
1875–1939	Nawal el-Sadaawi	Egypt	1931	2021		
1875–1939	Idola Saint-Jean	Canada	1880	1945	Suffragette; journalist	
1875–1939	Celia Sánchez	Cuba	1920	1980	Early pioneer feminist	
1875–1939	Ellen Sandelin	Sweden	1862	1907	Physician, lecturer	
1875–1939	Flora Sandes	United Kingdom	1876	1956	Feminist Sgt. Major in Serbian Army	
1875–1939	Margaret Sanger	United States	1879	1966	Socialist feminist; Founder of American Birth Control League; co-founder and long-time president of Planned Parenthood; writer, nurse	
1875–1939	Milunka Savić	Serbia	1888	1973	First European combatant, soldier, feminist	
1875–1939	Rosika Schwimmer	Hungary	1877	1948	Pacifist, feminist, suffragist and diplomat	
1875–1939	Barbara Seaman	United States	1935	2008		
1875–1939	Baroness Seear	United Kingdom	1913	1997		
1875–1939	Huda Shaarawi	Egypt	1879	1947	Muslim feminist; organizer for the Mubarrat Muhammad Ali (women's social service organization), the Union of Educated Egyptian Women and the Wafdist Women's Central Committee, founder and first president of the Egyptian Feminist Union	
1875–1939	Alix Kates Shulman	United States	1932	–	Radical feminist	
1875–1939	Ruth Simpson	United States	1926	2008		
1875–1939	Monica Sjöö	Sweden	1938	2005	Ecofeminist	
1875–1939	Eleanor Smeal	United States	1939	–	Second-wave feminist; organizer, initiator, president of NOW, founder and president of the Feminist Majority Foundation	
1875-1939	Joke Smit	Netherlands	1933	1981	Second-wave feminist; activist, seminal writer, co-founder of Man Vrouw Maatschappij	
1875–1939	Valerie Solanas	United States	1936	1988	Radical feminist	
1875–1939	Jo Spence	United Kingdom	1934	1992		
1875–1939	Gloria Steinem	United States	1934	2026	Second-wave feminist; Socialist feminist; radical feminist; anti-pornography feminist; writer	
1875–1939	Doris Stevens	United States	1892	1963	Organizer for National American Women Suffrage Association and the National Woman's Party, prominent Silent Sentinels participant, author Jailed for Freedom	
1875–1939	Sandy Stone	United States	1936	–	Transfeminist; Second-wave feminist; Theorist, author, and performance artist	
1875–1939	Marie Stopes	United Kingdom	1880	1958		
1875–1939	Mary Stott	United Kingdom	1907	2002		
1875–1939	Jessie Street	Australia	1889	1970	Suffragette, feminist; human rights campaigner; influential in labour rights and early days of UN	
1875–1939	Louisa Strittmater	United States	1896	1944	Feminist whose division of her estate to the National Woman's Party as listed in her will was controversially contested.	
1875–1939	Edith Summerskill, Baroness Summerskill	United Kingdom	1901	1980		
1875–1939	Maya Surduts	France	1937	2016	Human rights activist, feminist and reproductive rights campaigner	
1875–1939	Maria Svolou	Greece	1890s	1976	Socialist feminist	
1875–1939	Elisabeth Tamm	Sweden	1880	1958		
1875–1939	Mavis Tate	United Kingdom	1893	1947		
1875–1939	Joan Kennedy Taylor	United States	1926	2005		
1875–1939	Renee Taylor	New Zealand	1929	2023	Socialist feminist	
1875–1939	Tcheng Yu-hsiu	China	1891	1959	Revolutionary	
1875–1939	Rini Templeton	United States	1935	1986	Socialist feminist	
1875–1939	Dorothy Thompson	United States	1893	1961	Buffalo and New York suffragist, later an influential journalist and radio broadcaster	
1875–1939	J. Ann Tickner	United States	1937	–		
1875–1939	Winifred Todhunter	United Kingdom	1877	1961		
1875–1939	Jill Tweedie	United Kingdom	1936	1993		
1875-1939	Livia Veloz	Dominican Republic	1892	1980	Suffragist, feminist activist	
1875–1939	Mabel Vernon	United States	1883	1975	Suffragist, principal member of the Congressional Union for Women Suffrage, major organizer for the Silent Sentinels	
1875–1939	Roosje Vos	The Netherlands	1876	1961	Trade unionist, suffragist and politician	
1875–1939	Harriet Shaw Weaver	United Kingdom	1860	1932	Suffragette	
1875–1939	Nesta Helen Webster	United Kingdom	1876	1960		
1875–1939	Louise Weiss	France	1893	1983	Journalist, writer, politician	
1875–1939	Trude Weiss-Rosmarin	United States, Germany	1908	1989		
1875–1939	Clara Wichmann	Netherlands, Germany,	1885	1922	Radical feminist	
1875–1939	Audrey Wise	United Kingdom	1935	2000		
1875–1939	Monique Wittig	France	1935	2003		
1875–1939	Nellie Wong	United States	1934	–	Socialist feminist	
1875–1939	Virginia Woolf	United Kingdom	1882	1941	First-wave feminist	
1875-1939	Sylvia Wynter	Jamaica, United States	1928	–	Black feminist	
1875–1939	Molly Yard	United States	1912	2005	Second-wave feminist	
1875–1939	Adelina Zendejas	Mexico	1909	1993	Socialist feminist	
1875–1939	Llibertat Ródenas Rodriguez	Spain	1892	1970	Anarcho-syndicalist and feminist activist and militant, member of the Mujeres Libres group	
1875–1939	Amparo Poch y Gascón	Spain	1902	1968	Doctor by profession and an anarchist, pacifist and feminist activist, one of the co-founders of the Mujeres Libres group	
1875–1939	Mercè Comaposada	Spain	1901	1994	Lawyer and pedagogue by profession and an anarcho-feminist, one of the co-founders of the Mujeres Libres group	
1875–1939	Lucía Sánchez Saornil	Spain	1895	1970	Anarcho-syndicalist and feminist activist, poet and one of the co-founders of the Mujeres Libres group	

== Mid to late 20th-century feminists ==
Born between 1940 and 1999.

Period (birth)	Name	Country	Born	Died	Comments	Source
1940–1999	Zsuzsanna Budapest	Hungary	1940	–	Founder of the female-only tradition of the Dianic Wicca religion	
1940–1999	Lesley Abdela	United Kingdom	1945	–	Expert on women's rights and representation	
1940–1999	Patricia Monaghan	United States	1946	2012	Proponent of the American Goddess movement	
1940–1999	Brooke Ackerly	United States	1966	–	Expert on feminist theory, feminist international relations, and scholar activism	
1940–1999	Carol J. Adams	United States	1951	–	Ecofeminist	
1940–1999	Chimamanda Ngozi Adichie	Nigeria & United States	1977	–	Writer, social commentator, feminist author	
1940–1999	Haleh Afshar, Baroness Afshar	United Kingdom	1944	2022	Muslim feminist, professor of politics and women's studies, member of the British House of Lords	
1940–1999	Leila Ahmed	Egypt	1940	–	Writer on Islamic feminism	
1940–1999	Sara Ahmed	United Kingdom	1969	–	British-Australian academic working at the intersection of feminist theory, queer theory, critical race theory and postcolonialism	
1940–1999	Widad Akrawi	Denmark	1969	–	Writer and doctor, advocate for gender equality and women's empowerment and participation in peace building and post-conflict governance	
1940–1999	Linda Martín Alcoff	United States	1955	–	Philosopher at the City University of New York	
1940–1999	Ayaan Hirsi Ali	United States, Netherlands, Somalia,	1969	–	Somali-Dutch feminist and atheist activist, writer and politician	
1940–1999	Pam Allen	United States	1943	–	A founder of New York Radical Women	
1940–1999	Isabel Allende	Chile, United States	1942	–	Writer	
1940–1999	Jane Alpert	United States	1947	–	Radical feminist	
1940–1999	Tori Amos	United States	1963	–	Third-wave feminist	
1940–1999	Gloria E. Anzaldúa	United States	1942	2004	Third-wave feminist	
1940–1999	Maria Arbatova	USSR	1957	–		
1940–1999	Parvin Ardalan	Iran	1967	–	Women's rights activist	
1940–1999	Judith Astelarra	Argentina	1943	–	Sociologist specializing in gender studies	
1940–1999	Élisabeth Badinter	France	1944	–	Dissident	
1940–1999	Raquel Olea	Chile	1944	–	prominent figure of feminism in Chile	
1940–1999	Judi Bari	United States	1949	1997	Ecofeminist	
1940–1999	Kathleen Barry	United States	1941	–	Anti-prostitution feminist	
1940–1999	Benedetta Barzini	Italy	1943	–	Radical feminist	
1940–1999	Jennifer Baumgardner	United States	1970	–	Third-wave feminist	
1940–1999	Alison Bechdel	United States	1960	–	Cartoonist, author; creator of the Bechdel test	
1940–1999	Melissa Benn	United Kingdom	1957	–	Third-wave feminist	
1940–1999	Julie Bindel	United Kingdom	1962	–	Anti-pornography feminist	
1940–1999	Kat Blaque	United States	1990	–	Transfeminist, Third-wave feminist, Vlogger	
1940–1999	Rosie Boycott	United Kingdom	1951	–		
1940–1999	Dionne Brand	Canada	1953	–		
1940–1999	Giannina Braschi	Puerto Rico	1953	–	Third-wave feminist	
1940–1999	Johanna Brenner	United States	1942	–	Socialist feminist	
1940–1999	Susie Bright	United States	1958	–	Third-wave feminist; sex-positive feminism	
1940–1999	Flora Brovina	Kosovo	1949	–		
1940–1999	Rita Mae Brown	United States	1944	–	Second-wave feminist; radical feminist; Redstockings	
1940–1999	Carrie Brownstein	United States	1974	–	Third-wave feminist	
1940–1999	Tammy Bruce	United States	1962	–	Dissident feminist	
1940–1999	Charlotte Bunch	United States	1944	–	Second-wave feminist	
1940–1999	Louise Burfitt-Dons	United Kingdom	1953	–	Conservative feminist	
1940–1999	Judith Butler	United States	1956	–	Third-wave feminist	
1940–1999	Octavia Butler	United States	1947	2006		
1940–1999	Lydia Cacho	Mexico	1963	–		
1940–1999	Beatrix Campbell	United Kingdom	1947	–	Second-wave feminist	
1940–1999	Angela Carter	United Kingdom	1940	1992	Socialist feminist	
1940–1999	Ana Castillo	United States	1953	–		
1940–1999	Phyllis Chesler	United States	1940	–	Feminist author, professor	
1940–1999	Margaret Cho	United States	1968	–	Third-wave feminist	
1940–1999	Nancy Chodorow	United States	1944	2025		
1940–1999	Mary Clark-Glass	United Kingdom	1944	–		
1940–1999	Adele Clarke	United States	1940	2024	Feminist sociologist	
1940–1999	Cheryl Clarke	United States	1947	–	Poet, essayist, educator, and Black feminist community activist	
1940–1999	Hillary Clinton	United States	1947	–		
1940–1999	Kurt Cobain	United States	1967	1994	Feminist musician	
1940–1999	Susan G. Cole	Canada	1952	–	Anti-pornography feminist	
1940–1999	Patricia Hill Collins	United States	1948	–	Third-wave feminist; Black feminist	
1940–1999	Sandra Coney	New Zealand	1944	–	Second-wave feminist	
1940–1999	Noreen Connell	United States	1947	–	radical feminist	
1940–1999	Jeanne Córdova	United States	1948	2016	Second-wave feminist; lesbian and gay rights activist	
1940–1999	Rosalind Coward	United Kingdom	1952	–		
1940–1999	Laverne Cox	United States	1972	–	Transfeminist	
1940–1999	Bernadette Cozart	United States	1949	2009	Ecofeminist	
1940–1999	Nikki Craft	United States	1949	–	Radical feminist; anti-pornography feminist; suffragist; one of the main organizers of the Suffrage Hikes	
1940–1999	Jean Curthoys	Australia	1947	–	Dissident	
1940–1999	Kimberly Dark	United States	1968	–	Third-wave feminist	
1940–1999	Françoise David	Canada	1948	–	Feminist; politician	
1940–1999	Angela Davis	United States	1944	–	Second-wave feminist; Black feminist	
1940–1999	Geena Davis	United States	1956	–	Actor, founder of Geena Davis Institute on Gender in Media	
1940–1999	Martha Davis	United States	1957	–	Third-wave feminist	
1940–1999	Marie-Laure Sauty de Chalon	France	1962	–	Third-wave feminist	
1940–1999	Christine Delphy	France	1941	–	Socialist feminist; material feminist	
1940–1999	Julie Delpy	France	1969	–		
1940–1999	Mark Dery	United States	1959	–	Third-wave feminist; cyberfeminist	
1940–1999	Ani DiFranco	United States	1970	–	Third-wave feminist	
1940–1999	Gail Dines	United Kingdom	1958	–	Anti-pornography feminist	
1940–1999	Unity Dow	Botswana	1959	–	Judge and writer; plaintiff in a case that allowed children of Motswana women and foreign men to be considered Batswana	
1940–1999	Carol Ann Duffy	United Kingdom	1955	–		
1940–1999	Andrea Dworkin	United States	1946	2005	Radical feminist; anti-prostitution feminist; anti-pornography feminist	
1940–1999	Shirin Ebadi	Iran	1947	–	Muslim feminist; activist, Nobel Peace Prize winner for her efforts for the rights of women and children	
1940–1999	Barbara Ehrenreich	United States	1941	2022	Socialist feminist	
1940–1999	Beth Elliott	United States	1950	–	Transfeminist, Second-wave feminist, folk-singer, activist, and writer	
1940-1999	Lindsay Ellis	United States	1984	–	Video Essayist	
1940–1999	Misako Enoki	Japan	1945	–	Second-wave feminist	
1940–1999	Susan Faludi	United States	1959	–	Second-wave feminist	
1940–1999	Fadia Faqir	United Kingdom, Jordan	1956	–		
1940–1999	Melissa Farley	United States	1942	–	Second-wave feminist; radical feminist; anti-pornography feminist	
1940–1999	Johanna Fateman	United States	1974	–	Third-wave feminist	
1940–1999	Kathy Ferguson	United States	1950	–	Individualist feminist	
1940–1999	Shulamith Firestone	Canada	1945	2012	Second-wave feminist; radical feminist; Redstockings; New York Radical Feminists; New York Radical Women	
1940–1999	Deborah Frances-White	Australia and Great Britain	1967	–	Stand-up comedian; Feminist in the community of Ex-Jehovah's Witnesses	
1940–1999	Estelle Freedman	United States	1947	–	Second-wave feminist	
1940–1999	Jo Freeman	United States	1945	–	Second-wave feminist	
1940–1999	Juliette Fretté	United States	1983	–	Sex-positive feminist	
1940–1999	Marilyn Frye	United States	1941	–		
1940–1999	Antonella Gambotto-Burke	Australia and Great Britain	1965	–	Fourth-wave feminist	
1940–1999	Lindsey German	United Kingdom	1951	–		
1940–1999	Tavi Gevinson	United States	1996	–	Third-wave feminist	
1940–1999	Lois Marie Gibbs	United States	1951	–	Ecofeminist	
1940–1999	Stan Goff	United States	1951	–	Socialist feminist	
1940–1999	Lucy Goodison	United Kingdom	c. 1940s	–		
1940–1999	Heide Göttner-Abendroth	Germany	1941	–	Second-wave feminist	
1940–1999	John Green	United States	1977	–		
1940–1999	Susan Griffin	United States	1943	2025	Ecofeminist; anti-pornography feminist	
1940–1999	Miss Major Griffin-Gracy	United States	1940	2025	Transfeminist	
1940–1999	Emily Haines	Canada	1974	–	Third-wave feminist	
1940–1999	Daphne Hampson	United Kingdom	1944	–		
1940–1999	Carol Hanisch	United States	1942	–	Second-wave feminist; radical feminist; Redstockings; New York Radical Women	
1940–1999	Kathleen Hanna	United States	1968	–	Third-wave feminist; riot grrrl	
1940–1999	Donna Haraway	United States	1944	–	Second-wave feminist; Socialist feminist	
1940–1999	Nancy Hartsock	United States	1943	2015	Second-wave feminist	
1940–1999	Rosemary Hennessy	United States	1950	–	Material feminist	
1940–1999	Shere Hite	Germany	1942	2020		
1940–1999	Sarah Hoagland	United States	1945	–	Anti-pornography feminist	
1940–1999	Risa Hontiveros-Baraquel	Philippines	1966	–	Filipina women's right activist Philippines	
1940–1999	Gillian Howie	United Kingdom	1955	2013		
1940–1999	Donna M. Hughes	United States	1954	–	Third-wave feminist; cyberfeminist; anti-pornography feminist	
1940–1999	Holly Hunter	United States	1958	–	Third-wave feminist	
1940–1999	Anna Hutsol	UKR	1984	–	FEMEN	
1940–1999	Stevi Jackson	United Kingdom	1951	–	Material feminist	
1940–1999	Karla Jay	United States	1947	–		
1940–1999	Kirthi Jayakumar	India	1987	–	Intersectional Feminist	
1940–1999	Sheila Jeffreys	Australia	1948	–	Second-wave feminist; anti-pornography feminist	
1940–1999	Robert Jensen	United States	1958	–	Anti-pornography feminist	
1940–1999	Joan Jett	United States	1958	–	Third-wave feminist	
1940–1999	Claire Johnston	United Kingdom	1940	1987		
1940–1999	Miranda July	United States	1974	–	Third-wave feminist	
1940–1999	Mohja Kahf	Syria	1967	–	Muslim feminist	
1940–1999	Sheema Kalbasi	Iran	1972	–	Writer and advocate for human rights and gender equality	
1940–1999	Wendy Kaminer	United States	1949	–	Sex-positive feminist	
1940–1999	Marcelle Karp	United States	1964	–	Third-wave feminist; sex-positive feminist	
1940–1999	Roz Kaveney	United Kingdom	1949	–	Transfeminist; Writer, critic, and poet	
1940–1999	Jamie Lauren Keiles	United States	1992	–	Third-wave feminist	
1940–1999	Lierre Keith	United States	1964	–	Anti-pornography feminist; Radical feminist	
1940–1999	Petra Kelly	Germany	1947	1992	Ecofeminist	
1940–1999	Jean Kilbourne	United States	1943	–	Third-wave feminist	
1940–1999	Grace Ji-Sun Kim	United States, South Korea	1969	–	Third-wave feminist	
1940–1999	Sirje Kingsepp	Estonia	1969	–	Socialist feminist	
1940–1999	Barbara Kingsolver	United States	1955	–	Third-wave feminist	
1940–1999	Anne Klein	Germany	1941	2011	Berlin Senator for women, youth and family	
1940–1999	Bonnie Sherr Klein	United States	1941	–	Anti-pornography feminist	
1940–1999	Naomi Klein	Canada	1970	–	Socialist feminist	
1940–1999	Anne Koedt	United States	1941	–	Second-wave feminist; radical feminist; Redstockings; New York Radical Feminists; New York Radical Women	
1940–1999	Elaheh Koulaei	Iran	1956	–	Muslim feminist	
1940–1999	Sunitha Krishnan	India	1972	–	Indian social activist and chief functionary and co-founder of Prajwala, an institution that assists trafficked women, girls and transgender people in finding shelter, giving education and employment	
1940–1999	Julia Kristeva	France, Bulgaria	1941	–		
1940–1999	Winona LaDuke	United States	1959	–	Ecofeminist	
1940–1999	Laura Lederer	United States	1951	–	Anti-pornography feminist	
1940–1999	Ellie Levenson	United Kingdom	1978	–		
1940–1999	Ariel Levy	United States	1974	–	Third-wave feminist; anti-pornography feminist	
1940–1999	Olga Lipovskaya	Russia	1954	2021		
1940–1999	Jacqueline Livingston	United States	1943	2013	Second-wave feminist	
1940–1999	Sara Hlupekile Longwe	Zambia	c. 1950	–	radical feminist	
1940–1999	Linda Lovelace	United States	1949	2002	Anti-pornography feminist	
1940–1999	Wangari Maathai	Kenya	1940	2011	Ecofeminist	
1940–1999	Catharine MacKinnon	United States	1946	–	Anti-pornography feminist	
1940–1999	Madonna	United States	1958	–	sex-positive feminist	
1940–1999	Patricia Mainardi	United States	1942	–	Second-wave feminist; radical feminist; Redstockings; New York Radical Women	
1940–1999	Sara Maitland	United Kingdom	1950	–		
1940–1999	Catherine Malabou	France	1959	–		
1940–1999	Irshad Manji	Canada	1968	–	Muslim feminist	
1940–1999	Soe Tjen Marching	Indonesia	1971	–		
1940–1999	Amanda Marcotte	United States	1977	–		
1940–1999	Mirjana Marković	Serbia	1942	2019	Politician; writer	
1940–1999	Angela Mason	United Kingdom	1944	–	Second-wave feminist	
1940–1999	Joanna Maycock	Belgium and Great Britain	1971	–	European women's rights campaigner	
1940–1999	Liza Maza	Philippines	1957	–	Socialist feminist	
1940–1999	Susan McClary	United States	1946	–		
1940–1999	Deirdre McCloskey	United States	1942	–	Feminist economist	
1940–1999	Wendy McElroy	Canada	1951	–		
1940–1999	Patricia McFadden	Swaziland	1952	–	Radical feminist	
1940–1999	Angela McRobbie	United Kingdom	1951	–		
1940–1999	Rigoberta Menchú	Guatemala	1959	–		
1940–1999	Fatima Mernissi	Morocco	1940	2015	Muslim feminist	
1940–1999	Juliet Mitchell	United Kingdom	1940	–	Socialist feminist	
1940–1999	Hayao Miyazaki	Japan	1941	–	Socialist feminist	
1940–1999	Tracey Moberly	United Kingdom	1964	–		
1940–1999	Janet Mock	United States	1983	–	Transfeminist	
1940–1999	Chandra Talpade Mohanty	India	1955	–	Postcolonial and Transnational feminism theorist	
1940–1999	Maxine Molyneux	United Kingdom	1948	–		
1940–1999	Honor Moore	United States	1945	–		
1940–1999	Cherríe Moraga	United States	1952	–		
1940–1999	Caitlin Moran	United Kingdom	1975	–		
1940–1999	Robin Morgan	United States	1941	–	Second-wave feminist; radical feminist; anti-pornography feminist; New York Radical Women	
1940–1999	Bonnie J. Morris	United States	1961	–	Feminist scholar, author; women's movement, lesbian culture, and women's music historian	
1940–1999	Laura Mulvey	United Kingdom	1941	–		
1940–1999	Sally Rowena Munt	United Kingdom	1960	–	Feminist academic and lesbian theorist, author of Heroic Desire: Lesbian Identity and Cultural Space (1998)	
1940–1999	Jenni Murray	United Kingdom	1950	–		
1940–1999	Inga Muscio	United States	c. 1966	–	Third-wave feminist	
1940–1999	Kathy Najimy	United States	1957	–	Third-wave feminist	
1940–1999	Suniti Namjoshi	India	1941	–	Third-wave feminist; cyberfeminist	
1940–1999	Uma Narayan	United States	1958	–	Postcolonial feminist	
1940–1999	Taslima Nasrin	Bangladesh	1962	–	Feminist of Muslim origin	
1940–1999	Asra Nomani	India	1965	–	Muslim feminist	
1940–1999	Isa Noyola	United States	1978	–	Transfeminist, Latina transgender activist and national leader in the LGBT immigrant rights movement	
1940–1999	Martha Nussbaum	United States	1947	–		
1940–1999	Ann Oakley	United Kingdom	1944	–	Second-wave feminist	
1940–1999	Sandra Oh	Canada, United States	1971	–	Third-wave feminist	
1940–1999	Lars Ohly	Sweden	1957	–	Socialist feminist	
1940–1999	Terry O'Neill	United States	c. 1953	–		
1940–1999	Elliot Page	Canada	1987	–	Third-wave feminist	
1940–1999	Camille Paglia	United States	1947	–	Dissident feminist, academic, author of Sexual Personae: Art and Decadence from Nefertiti to Emily Dickinson (1990)	
1940–1999	Amanda Palmer	United States	1976	–	Third-wave feminist	
1940–1999	Carole Pateman	United Kingdom	1940	–		
1940–1999	Nancy Paterson (artist)	United States	1953	2010	Third-wave feminist; cyberfeminist	
1940–1999	Peaches	Canada	1966	–	Third-wave feminist	
1940–1999	Sue Perlgut	United States		–	Second-wave feminist; poet	
1940–1999	Vesna Pešić	Serbia	1940	–	Feminist; diplomat; politician	
1940–1999	Irene Peslikis	United States	1943	2002	Second-wave feminist; radical feminist; Redstockings; New York Radical Women	
1940–1999	Liz Phair	United States	1967	–	Third-wave feminist	
1940–1999	Mary Pipher	United States	1947	–	Second-wave feminist	
1940–1999	Katha Pollitt	United States	1949	–		
1940–1999	Griselda Pollock	Canada	1949	–	Second-wave feminist	
1940–1999	Soraya Post	Sweden	1956	–		
1940–1999	Anastasia Powell	Australia	1982	–	Third-wave feminist	
1940–1999	Manasi Pradhan	India	1962	–		
1940–1999	Sharon Presley	United States	1943	2022	Individualist feminist	
1940–1999	Maria Raha	United States	1972	–	Third-wave feminist	
1940–1999	Janice Raymond	United States	1943	–	Second-wave feminist; anti-prostitution feminist	
1940–1999	Bernice Johnson Reagon	United States	1942	2024	Second-wave feminist	
1940–1999	Helen Reddy	United States, Australia,	1941	2020	Second-wave feminist	
1940–1999	Tucker Reed	United States	1989	–	Student leader in the Title IX and campus rape awareness movement, founder of the national organization Student Coalition Against Rape; author of books notable for their realistic depiction of characters with social development disorders	
1940–1999	Elizabeth Anne Reid	Australia	1942	–	World's first advisor on women's affairs to a head of state (Labor Prime Minister Gough Whitlam and active on women's development for the UN; also prominent in HIV activism	
1940–1999	Abby Rockefeller	United States	1943	–	Radical feminist	
1940–1999	Ninotchka Rosca	Philippines	1946	–	Socialist feminist	
1940–1999	Jacqueline Rose	United Kingdom	1949	–		
1940–1999	Sheila Rowbotham	United Kingdom	1943	–	Second-wave feminist	
1940–1999	Gayle Rubin	United States	1949	–	Sex-positive feminist; Queer theorist	
1940–1999	Kathy Rudy	United States	1956	–	Ecofeminist	
1940–1999	Alzira Rufino	Brazil	1949	2023	Feminist and activist associated with the Black Movement	
1940–1999	Shadi Sadr	Iran	1975	–	Women's rights activist	
1940–1999	Gita Sahgal	United Kingdom, India	1956/7	–		
1940–1999	Sarojini Sahoo	India	1956	–		
1940–1999	JD Samson	United States	1978	–	Third-wave feminist	
1940–1999	Michael Sandel	United States	1953	–		
1940–1999	Justin Sane	United States, Ireland	1973	–	Socialist feminist	
1940–1999	Thomas Sankara	Burkina Faso	1949	1987		
1940–1999	Kathie Sarachild	United States	1943	–	Second-wave feminist; radical feminist; Redstockings; New York Radical Women	
1940–1999	Anita Sarkeesian	United States, Canada	1983	–		
1940–1999	Marjane Satrapi	France, Iran	1969	2026	Muslim feminist	
1940–1999	John Scalzi	United States	1969	–		
1940–1999	Alice Schwarzer	Germany	1942	–	Second-wave feminist; anti-pornography feminist; journalist and publisher of the magazine Emma	
1940–1999	Gudrun Schyman	Sweden	1948	–	Third-wave feminist	
1940–1999	Lynne Segal	Australia	1944	–	Second-wave feminist; Socialist feminist	
1940–1999	Julia Serano	United States	1967	–	Transfeminist	
1940–1999	Shamima Shaikh	South Africa	1960	1998	South African activist, member of the Muslim Youth Movement of South Africa, proponent of Islamic gender equality	
1940–1999	Shahla Sherkat	Iran	1956	–	Muslim feminist; journalist	
1940–1999	Vicki Shiran	Israel	1947	2004	Mizrahi feminist	
1940–1999	Vandana Shiva	India	1952	–	Ecofeminist	
1940–1999	Elaine Showalter	United States	1941	–		
1940–1999	Ann Simonton	United States	1952	–	Second-wave feminist; radical feminist; anti-pornography feminist	
1940–1999	Carol Smart	United Kingdom	1948	–		
1940–1999	Barbara Smith	United States	1946	–		
1940–1999	Joan Smith	United Kingdom	1953	–	Third-wave feminist	
1940–1999	Valerie Smith	Canada	1956	–	Anti-pornography feminist	
1940–1999	Kate Smurthwaite	United Kingdom	1975	–		
1940–1999	Cornelia Sollfrank	Germany	1960	–	Third-wave feminist; cyberfeminist	
1940–1999	Patricia Soltysik	United States	1950	1974	Radical feminist	
1940–1999	Christina Hoff Sommers	United States	1950	–	Dissident	
1940–1999	Kate Soper	United Kingdom	1943	–		
1940–1999	Donita Sparks	United States	1963	–	Third-wave feminist; Riot grrrl	
1940–1999	Dale Spender	Australia	1943	2023	Second-wave feminist	
1940–1999	Charlene Spretnak	United States	1946	–	Ecofeminist	
1940–1999	Annie Sprinkle	United States	1954	–	Third-wave feminist; Sex-positive feminist	
1940–1999	Starhawk	United States	1951	–	Ecofeminist	
1940–1999	Patrick Stewart	United Kingdom	1940	2026	Socialist feminist	
1940–1999	John Stoltenberg	United States	1944	–	Second-wave feminist; radical feminist; anti-pornography feminist	
1940–1999	Nadine Strossen	United States	1950	–	Third-wave feminist	
1940–1999	Anne Summers	Australia	1945	–	Women's rights activist; women's advisor to Labor Prime Minister Paul Keating and editor of Ms. magazine (New York)	
1940–1999	Cathy Harkin	Northern Ireland	1942	1985	Women's refuge	
1940–1999	Karlina Leksono Supelli	Indonesia	1958	–		
1940–1999	Kazimiera Szczuka	Poland	1966	–		
1940–1999	Lili Taylor	United States	1967	–	Third-wave feminist	
1940-1999	Twie Tjoa	Netherlands	1943	-	Women's rights activist for black, migrant and refugee women, high Suriname civil servant, sociologist and author	
1940–1999	Roya Toloui	Iran	1966	–	Women's rights activist	
1940–1999	Corin Tucker	United States	1972	–	Third-wave feminist	
1940–1999	Robin Tunney	United States	1972	–	Third-wave feminist	
1940–1999	Urvashi Vaid	United States, India	1958	2022		
1940–1999	Tobi Vail	United States	1969	–	Third-wave feminist; Riot grrrl	
1940–1999	Jessica Valenti	United States	1978	–	Third-wave feminist	
1940–1999	Virginia Vargas	Peru	1945	–		
1940–1999	Norah Vincent	United States	1968	2022	Dissident feminist	
1940–1999	Hilary Wainwright	United Kingdom	1949	–	Second-wave feminist; Socialist feminist	
1940–1999	Alice Walker	United States	1944	–	radical feminist; Black feminist	
1940–1999	Rebecca Walker	United States	1969	–	Third-wave feminist	
1940–1999	Michele Wallace	United States	1952	–	Second-wave feminist	
1940–1999	Natasha Walter	United Kingdom	1967	–	Third-wave feminist	
1940–1999	Peng Wan-ru	Taiwan	1949	1996		
1940–1999	Betsy Warrior	United States	1940	–	Founding member of the Boston-area women's liberation group Cell 16	
1940–1999	Gloria Jean Watkins	United States	1952	2021	Third-wave feminist; Socialist feminist; Black feminist	
1940–1999	Emma Watson	England	1990	–	Actor, feminist, United Nations Women Goodwill Ambassador	
1940–1999	Joss Whedon	United States	1964	–	Previously listed as a male feminist, he generated a toxic work environment for many women in his shows.	
1940–1999	Faith Wilding	United States, Paraguay	1943	–	Third-wave feminist; cyberfeminist	
1940–1999	Ellen Willis	United States	1941	2006	Second-wave feminist; radical feminist; sex-positive feminist; Redstockings; New York Radical Women	
1940–1999	Kaia Wilson	United States	1974	–	Third-wave feminist	
1940–1999	Oprah Winfrey	United States	1954	–	Second-wave feminist	
1940–1999	Valerie Wise	United Kingdom	1955	–		
1940–1999	Naomi Wolf	United States	1962	–	Dissident feminist; Third-wave feminist	
1940–1999	Allison Wolfe	United States	1969	–	Third-wave feminist	
1940–1999	Elizabeth Wurtzel	United States	1967	2020		
1940–1999	Cathy Young	United States, Russia	1963	–		
1940–1999	Malala Yousafzai	Pakistan	1997	–	Pakistani feminist activist for female education	
1940–1999	Stasa Zajovic	Serbia	1953	–	Co-founder and coordinator of Women in Black	
1940–1999	Julie Zeilinger	United States	1993	–	Third-wave feminist	
1980-1996	Vigdís Finnbogadóttir	Iceland	1930	-	First democratically elected woman president	
1940–1999	Itziar Ziga	Spain	1974	-		

== Notable 20th and 21st-century feminists ==
Birth years for the following entries are currently unavailable.

Period (birth)	Name	Country	Born	Died	Comments	Source
1940–2026	Gia Abrassart	Belgium	20th century	–	Decolonial journalist and feminist owner of literary cafe	
1940–2026	Lorraine Bethel	United States	20th century	–	Second-wave feminist	
1940–2026	Lauran Bethell	United States	20th century	–	Anti-prostitution feminist	
1940–2026	D. A. Clarke	United States	20th century	–	Radical feminist; anti-pornography feminist	
1940–2026	Carol Cohn	United States	20th century	–	Gender and armed conflict	
1940–2026	Donna Dresch	United States	20th century	–	Third-wave feminist; Riot grrrl	
1940–2026	Gunilla Ekberg	Sweden	20th century	–	Anti-prostitution feminist	
1940–2026	Mary Flanagan	United States	20th century	–	Third-wave feminist; cyberfeminist	
1940–2026	Luzviminda Ilagan	Philippines	20th century	–	Socialist feminist	
1940–2026	Noushin Ahmadi Khorasani	Iran	20th century	–	Muslim feminist	
1940–2026	Andrew Kooman	Canada	20th century	–	Anti-prostitution feminist; anti-pornography feminist	
1940–2026	Peggy Kornegger	United States	20th century	–		
1940–2026	Donna Laframboise	Canada	20th century	–	Dissident feminist	
1940–2026	Paris Lees	United Kingdom	20th century	–	Transfeminist, journalist, presenter, and transgender rights activist	
1940–2026	Dorchen Leidholdt	United States	20th century	–	Anti-pornography feminist	
1940–2026	Kristin Lems	United States	20th century	–	Activist, singer/songwriter	
1940–2026	Jamie McIntosh	Canada	20th century	–	Lawyer and women's rights activist	
1940–2026	Page Mellish	United States	20th century	–	Anti-pornography feminist	
1940–2026	Meghan Murphy	Canada	20th century	–	Journalist; radical feminist; anti-sex industry feminist	
1940-2026	Nalini Nayak	India	20th century	—		
1940–2026	Benjamin Nolot	United States	20th century	–	Anti-prostitution feminist	
1940–2026	Jerilynn Prior	Canada	20th century	–		
1940–2026	Debbie Stoller	United States	20th century	–	Third-wave feminist; sex-positive feminist	
1940–2026	Lucy Suchman	United Kingdom	20th century	–	Third-wave feminist; cyberfeminist	
1940–2026	Helen Sworn	United Kingdom	20th century	–	Anti-prostitution feminist	
1940–2026	Kajsa Wahlberg	Sweden	20th century	–	Anti-prostitution feminist; Sweden's national rapporteur on human trafficking opposition activities	
1940–2026	Warcry	United States	20th century	–	Radical feminist	
1940–2026	Alice Wolfson	United States	20th century	–		
1940–2026	Sande Zeig	United States	20th century	–		
2001-2026	John Locapo	United States	20th century	−		
2007-2026	Felipe Jacoby	Ireland	20th century	−		
2007-2026	Qaiz Aaron Rodrigues	England	20th century			

== See also ==
- First-wave feminists
- Second-wave feminists
- Third-wave feminists
- Fourth-wave feminists
- Ecofeminism
- Feminist separatism
- French feminism
- Islamic feminists
- Lesbian feminism
- Radical feminism
- Sex-positive feminism
- Suffragettes
- Women's suffrage
- Anti-pornography feminism
- Anti-prostitution feminism
- The Furies Collective
- New York Radical Feminists
- New York Radical Women
- Redstockings
- Riot grrrl
- List of conservative feminisms
- List of suffragists and suffragettes
- List of women's rights activists
- Timeline of first women's suffrage in majority-Muslim countries
- Timeline of women's rights (other than voting)
- Timeline of women's suffrage
