= Rosario Dolcet Martí =

Spanish trade unionist (1881–1968)

Rosario Dolcet
- Born: 2 February 1881; Vilanova i la Geltrú, Catalonia, Spain
- Died: 27 October 1968 (aged 87); Carcassonne, Occitania, France
- Occupation: Textile worker
- Organization: Confederación Nacional del Trabajo
- Movement: Anarchism

Rosario Dolcet (or Dulcet) Martí (2 February 1881 in Vilanova i la Geltrú – 27 October 1968 in Carcassonne) was a Spanish anarcho-syndicalist militant, exiled by the Francoist dictatorship.

== Biography ==
She was the daughter of Jaume Dolcet, a federal republican who sent her to a school where she was taught by the freethinker Teresa Mañé i Miravet (mother of Federica Montseny), who introduced her to anarchism through reading. At the age of 14, she started working in a textile factory in Villanueva y Geltrú and joined the Federación de las Tres Clases de Vapor, a labor society established in 1869 and whose anarchist faction would become part of the Confederación Nacional del Trabajo (CNT) in 1913.

Dolcet went to Sabadell, where she became a member of the Federación Obrera Sabadellense, but due to her active participation in the weavers' strike of 1913, where she organized assemblies, she had to go to France. She settled in the French commune of Sète, during the First World War, where she made anti-militarist propaganda, which was why she had to flee to Montpellier for a few years. In 1917, she settled in Barcelona where she actively participated in the CNT campaign for cheaper food and against speculation of exports to belligerent countries through the revolutionary general strike of that year. She participated in demonstrations of women who raided stores, and she stood out in a rally at the Republican Center of the Arrabal where she incited those present to abandon the parties and join workers' organizations to destroy capitalism and the State. Although she was a member of the Hoyo Textile Union, in 1918 she participated in meetings of the CNT in Tarragona. She also had an active role in feminist protests and in the Canadenca strike.

During the 1920s, she participated in numerous CNT events and welcomed in her home victims of Severiano Martínez Anido's reprisals, with one of whom, Marcelino Silva, she had a bond. During the dictatorship of Primo de Rivera, she was arrested twice for inciting rebellion and distributing propaganda. She fled to Tarragona, where she was welcomed by the militants Hermós Plaja i Salón and Carme Tabicas Sans, with whom she continued the propaganda tasks.

After the proclamation of the Second Spanish Republic, she participated with Pepita Not or Llibertat Ródenas Rodriguez in talks at the Ateneo de Madrid to denounce the persecution of the anarcho-syndicalist leaders and organize solidarity with the prisoners. In 1933, she was a delegate to the Regional Plenum of the CNT. During the first years of the Spanish Civil War she made propaganda tours and collaborated with different peasant communities. Her partner, Marcelino Silva, was assassinated by communists during the events of May 1937. At the end of the Spanish Civil War she went into exile in France. In October 1948, she participated as a delegate of the Local Federation of Marseillette in the Second Congress of the Spanish Libertarian Movement in Toulouse. She later settled in Carcassonne where she participated actively in the Local Federation of the CNT until her death. She refused to learn French in protest at France's treatment of Spanish exiles and wrote articles in the anarchist women's publication Alejandra. She was killed by a car in Carcassonne on October 27, 1968.

== See also ==
- Anarchism in Spain
