= Valerie Smith =

Valerie Smith may refer to:

- Valerie Brown, aka Valerie Smith, a character from the Josie and the Pussycats comics
- Valerie Smith (academic) (born 1956), American scholar and current president of Swarthmore College
- Valerie Smith (social activist), Canadian social activist
- Valerie Smith, born Violet Barclay (1922–2010), American illustrator
- Valerie Smith (musician) (born 1966), American bluegrass musician
- Valerie Smith (athlete) from Athletics at the 1984 Summer Paralympics
- Valerie Smith (swimmer) from Swimming at the 1984 Summer Paralympics

== See also ==
- Victor Barker, born Valerie Arkell-Smith (1895–1960), transgender man notable for marrying a woman in 1923
- Valerie Phare-Smith, candidate in the 1979 Canadian federal elections
