= O Say Can You See =

"O Say Can You See" is the incipit of the national anthem of the United States, "The Star-Spangled Banner".

O Say Can You See and similar phrases may also refer to:

- "Oh Say Can You See", a song from the 2010 album Lana Del Ray by Lana Del Rey
- Oh, Say, Can You See? The Semiotics of the Military in Hawaii, a 1995 book by political scientists Kathy Ferguson and Phyllis Turnbull
