= Hoheisel =

Hoheisel is a German surname. Notable people with the surname include:

- Guido Hoheisel (1894–1968), German mathematician
- Marie Hoheisel (1873–1947), Austrian women's rights activist
- Tobias Hoheisel (born 1967), German-born stage designer and director
- Nick Hoheisel, American politician
