= Marie-Laure Sauty de Chalon =

French businesswoman (born 1962)

- Born: 17 September 1962 (age 63); Paris, France
- Education: Panthéon-Assas University; Sciences Po
- Occupation: Businesswoman
- Spouse: Guillaume Hannezo
- Children: 3

Marie-Laure Sauty de Chalon (born September 17, 1962) is a French businesswoman and feminist. She was CEO of the auFeminin.com group, from 2010 until April 2018. Aufeminin Group is the Europe's leading Internet portal dedicated to women's content. Le Figaro called her company number one in that category. She is considered by Dun and Bradstreet to be a major executive in Europe.

She can be considered a proponent of third-wave feminism, due to her refusal to be "locked in a binary world," her "dynamic and combative" personality, her publicly stated admiration of writer Fatou Diome, her work in marketing and selling by women and to women, her advocacy of human rights, especially against domestic violence, and her embrace of contradictions and conflict. She is frequently asked to comment publicly on issues of feminism and diversity.

== Education and early career ==
Sauty de Chalon had worked (as of 2004) for Le Monde, part of Publications de La Vie Catholique, a large media group. Publishers Jean-Marie Colombani and Claude Perdriel selected her to lead their commercial division. Her selection was considered unusual, in part because of her master's degree in law at the French school Sciences-Po. Constance Benqué, president of Lagardere Active Publicité, called her dynamic and combative, in French, "dynamique et combative".

Sauty de Chalon was appointed in December 2004 to lead the Carat France division of Aegis Media Europe, a large marketing and advertising firm. The parent company, Aegis Group plc, is a global marketing communications company headquartered in London, United Kingdom, is capitalized at c. £1.5 billion, and employs almost 16,800 staff in over 80 countries. She was quoted as saying that 2005 was both "best year of my professional life", and "the worst year of my life". In January 2006, she was appointed CEO of Aegis Media France. In April 2009, Aegis Media replaced her, limiting her role to "southern Europe and Belgium".

== Current work ==
Sauty de Chalon hopes to gain revenue for auFeminin.com beyond advertising, to selling products online to women. She is expanding its already "a rare example of a European Internet company that is a world leader in its field". However, there are no plans to enter the American market yet, and will keep her "French worldview". For example, she is against "absolute freedom of speech", instead favoring "human rights".

In an open letter to the Association européenne contre les Violences faites aux Femmes au Travail (AVTF), a feminist European organization against violence towards working women, she declared her hatred of domestic violence. She wrote to them that:

my mission is to hunt down injustices against women in the exercise of my functions, as in the past in the media groups that I ran I always paid the greater attention to gender sensitivity and violence against women.... It is easy to cause a dismissal for failure to sexist remarks or behavior when you are an employer. We must indeed speak to the best companies on the subject. Aufeminin can be a forum on this topic.

— Marie-Laure Sauty de Chalon (Google translation as edited)

In December 2010, she was a speaker at the "Diversity management in Europe" conference.

== Other activities ==
- LVMH, Independent Member of the Board of Directors

== Personal ==
Her father was a lawyer by training, and was a deputy director of Crédit Lyonnais. Sauty de Chalon has lived in New York City and owns a house in the heart of the Côte d’Azur. She admires as her role models Nelson Mandela, Franklin D. Roosevelt, and Fatou Diomé. She is married to business executive Guillaume Hannezo with whom she has three children.

== Publications ==
- Médias, votre public n'est plus dans la salle (Editions Nouveaux débats publics 2007) ISBN 2-916962-02-6 ("Media, your audience is no longer in the room")

== See also ==
- List of feminists
- Feminism in France
