= Joanna Maycock =

Activist

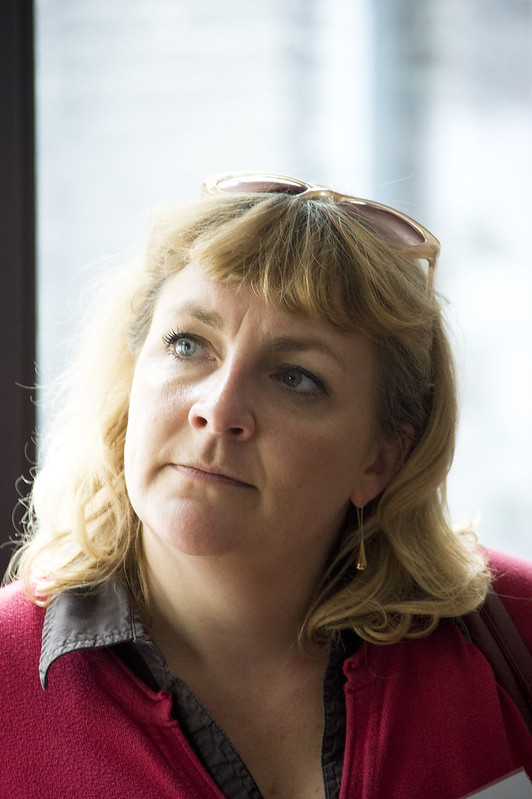
- Joanna Maycock in 2014

Joanna Maycock (born 22 January 1971) is a European women's rights campaigner. She is a British and Belgian citizen. Maycock was the Secretary General of the European Women's Lobby for seven years, until July 2021.

Maycock arrived in Brussels in 1992. She has been for 12 years chief of the Brussels office of the international NGO ActionAid dedicated to fighting poverty. She took over the leadership of the European Women's Lobby in 2014. Maycock has been described by Politico as a "powerhouse on the Brussels NGO and political scene".

== Denouncing the gender gap in society ==
Maycock has been denouncing the Gender pay gap, which in combination with other factors such as lower work force participation by women, translated into women's pensions in Europe being almost 40% lower than men's. Because austerity measures affect women more than men, the austerity policy in Europe after the 2008 financial crisis contributed to create a Pink Ghetto.

According to Maycock, there is a gender gap in the coverage of the COVID-19 pandemic, similar to the coverage gap of the 2008 financial crisis, described by Maycock as "overwhelmingly a boys' club of commentary."

== Political participation of women ==
Maycock has been advocating for an equal number of female and male commissioners at the European Commission. Maycock has been leading transatlantic efforts to increase women's participation in politics.

== Feminist leadership ==
Maycock warned against complacency among civil society organizations towards gender inequality in the leadership of civil rights organizations themselves. Even if on the surface representation of women in civil society organizations such as Civicus seems ensured to a great degree, Maycock called on their leadership to keep challenging visible and invisible barriers in the daily experiences of women.

In 2019, Maycock contributed to launch the initiative W100 at the level of the city of Brussels. The initiative aims at connecting women within the city across different social and cultural backgrounds, in order to amplify their voice in local politics and acknowledge the contribution of women in the society, in particular during the COVID-19 pandemic.

== Combating male violence against women ==
In her role at the European Women's Lobby, Maycock advocated in favour of legislation combating male violence against women. She campaigned in Europe in favour of the Istanbul Convention, a treaty of the Council of Europe against violence against women and domestic violence, as well as, for the introduction by the European Commission of an EU Directive on combating violence against women and domestic violence.
