= In re Strittmater =

- Court: New Jersey Court of Errors and Appeals
- Full case name: In the Matter of the Estate of Strittmater
- Decided: May 15, 1947
- Citation: 140 N.J. Eq. 94; 53 A.2d 205 (1947)

Court membership
- Judges sitting: Chief Justice Clarence E. Case, Justices Bodine, Colie, Dill, Donges, Eastwood, Freund, Heher, McGeehan, McLean, Wachenfeld, Wells

Case opinions
- Per curiam
- Dissent: Colie, joined by Wells

In the Matter of the Estate of Strittmater (140 N.J. Eq. 94) is a 1947 New Jersey legal decision relating to the estate of well-known feminist, Louisa F. Strittmater (1896–1944).

== Background ==
Strittmater's division of her estate to the National Woman's Party (a feminist organization) was listed in her will which was contested based on Stittmater's capacity. Strittmater's lifelong physician, Dr. Sarah Smalley, testified to the court that Strittmater suffered from paranoia and a split personality. There was no contrary medical testimony, although the court noted that the factual evidence supported a split personality. In her public dealings, she was often "entirely reasonable and normal" and demonstrated a healthy, loving relationship with her parents. Yet in some later notes, she described her mother as a "Moronic she-devil" and her father as an "unintelligent savage." Her occasionally reasonable disposition would often be overcome by violent outbursts, including the killing of a pet kitten, explosive tantrums with "vile language," and destruction of household furniture (including a clock). Her secret scribblings espoused an "insane hatred of men" that manifested in a desire that all baby boys be "put to death at birth."

== Decision ==
The Essex County Orphans' Court found Strittmater to be incapable of executing the will in probate. On appeal, the decision was upheld; the Court of Appeals stated that ". . . it was her paranoic condition, especially her insane delusions about the male, that led her to leave her estate to the National Women’s Party." (Note: The court mistakenly refers to the organization as the National Women's Party, where it is actually the National Woman's Party) The court, holding that she lacked mental capacity, invalidated the will and distributed her assets to her closest relatives through intestate succession.

The Strittmater decision has been described as a pretextual decision arising from the judges' biases.
