= Directive on combating violence against women and domestic violence =

EU directive enacted in 2024

Directive (EU) 2024/1385
- European Union directive
- Title: Directive (EU) 2024/1385 of the European Parliament and of the Council of 14 May 2024 on combating violence against women and domestic violence
- Made by: European Parliament, Council
- Made under: Art. 82(2) and 83(1) TFEU
- Journal reference: OJ L, 2024/1385, 24 May 2024

History
- European Parliament vote: 24 April 2024
- Council Vote: 7 May 2024
- Date made: 14 May 2024
- Entry into force: 13 June 2024
- Implementation date: 14 June 2027
- Applies from: 14 June 2027

Preparative texts
- Commission proposal: 8 March 2022

The Directive on combating violence against women and domestic violence (Directive (EU) 2024/1385) is a European Union Directive with the aim of combating violence against women and domestic violence. It will apply from 14 June 2027.

== Details ==
The directive criminalises physical, psychological, economic and sexual violence against women across the EU, both offline and online. This includes, in particular, female genital mutilation, forced marriage and cyber violence, including the non-consensual sharing of intimate images (including deepfakes), cyberstalking, cyberbullying (including cyberflashing) and misogynistic hate speech.

The obligations imposed on Member States by the Directive include, in particular:

- the adoption of an implementation strategy,
- the implementation of prevention measures and awareness-raising campaigns,
- the establishment of a national helpline,
- the training of relevant professionals such as the police and public prosecutors.

An early version of a draft directive on combating gender-based violence provided for the harmonisation of sexual offences, particularly with regard to the definition of rape. On behalf of Germany, Justice Minister Marco Buschmann opposed such a directive in the European Commission in early 2024, arguing that the formulation of criminal law did not fall within the EU’s remit: criminal law was a matter for the Member States. France and the Netherlands also opposed the proposal in its original form. The directive was later resubmitted without the provision on rape. In addition, the provision in Article 30 on the establishment of shelters no longer refers solely to women, but to all victims of domestic and sexual violence.

The provisions entered into force on 13 June 2024 and must be transposed into national law by the Member States by 14 June 2027 (see Article 49 of the Directive).

== History ==
The European Commission proposed an EU-wide legislation in this area following a request to act by the European Parliament. In September 2021, Members of the European Parliament called on the European Commission to legislate to prevent violence against women and support the victims. The objective of the initiative was to make violence against women and domestic violence a crime under EU law, along with already criminalized conduct such as cybercrime, sexual exploitation and money laundering for example.

Under the proposal by the European Commission gender-based violence would be indeed considered as a crime under Article 83 of the Treaty on the Functioning of the European Union.

The initiative was called for by the European Women's Lobby in order to translate into EU legislation the standards of the Istanbul Convention on gender-based violence.
