= Maya Surduts =

Latvian-born, French feminist and revolutionary (1937-2016)

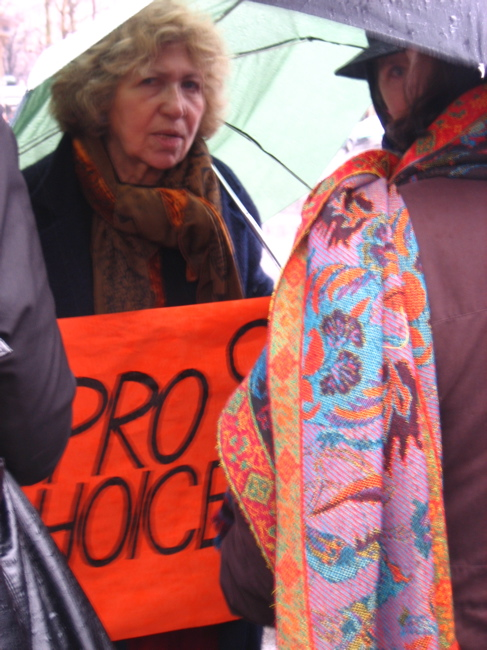
- Born: Merija Surduts; 17 March 1937; Riga, Latvia
- Died: 13 April 2016 (aged 79); Paris, France
- Occupations: activist, feminist
- Years active: 1970–2016

Maya Surduts (17 March 1937 – 13 April 2016) was a Latvian-born, French activist and women's rights supporter. She considered herself to be a permanent revolutionary and lived in various countries including South Africa, Switzerland, the United States and Cuba protesting regimes which discriminated against or exploited people.

== Early life ==
Merija Surduts was born on 17 March 1937 in Riga, Latvia into a Jewish communist family. Her father was a physicist and had left for Paris in 1936 after being arrested for his political activities, before her birth. Her mother was a psychologist, originally from Ponevezh, Lithuania, and immigrated in 1938 when Surduts was an infant with her mother and child. During the German occupation of Paris, the family fled to Nice and then lived in a town, Valdeblore on the border with Italy. When the Gestapo came to the border towns, they fled again to Montseveroux, but patrols in the area forced Surduts' parents to send her to live with a Catholic family. Between 1945 and 1946, Surduts was placed in a children's home run by the Entraide française (French Mutual Aid) in Bourgoin. She was later transferred to another Entraide home in Saint-Étienne and was finally reunited with her family in Paris. During this period, she only occasionally was able to attend school, but in addition to the Russian spoken in her home, she learned French and German.

In 1948, Surduts and her mother traveled on Nansen passports to South Africa to visit her maternal grandfather. They had planned to visit for six months, but stayed two years. Surduts enrolled in high school in Cape Town and she and her mother lived in a Jewish commune in Seapoint, where her mother became very active in the movement against Apartheid. Returning to France in 1950, the family lived in Arcueil and Surduts enrolled in the Lycée de Montgeron, but finished her high schooling at the Lycée Marie Curie, because her parents had moved to Bourg-la-Reine. During her high school years, the family's French citizenship was finally approved. She enrolled in the National Institute of Oriental Languages and Civilizations and became involved in the National Liberation Front to free Algeria from the colonial system. When she, and then her parents, were questioned about her political activities by the Direction Régionale de Police Judiciaire de Paris, Surduts fled to Geneva in 1960. Finishing school in Switzerland as an interpreter of English and Russian, in 1962, she received a scholarship to study in the United States and settled in Chicago. Participating in many events of the American civil rights movement, she attended the March on Washington for Jobs and Freedom in 1963 and then left for Cuba by way of Mexico.

== Career ==
Arriving in Cuba, Surduts was referred to the Ministry of Foreign Trade and was employed as a French translator, while she studied Spanish. At the time, there was a thriving cultural and literary community of foreign nationals in Cuba, and Surduts became prominent in that circle. For eight years, she worked translating and teaching French for the Trade Ministry and the Ministry of Foreign Affairs, simultaneously engaging in various activist enterprises to reduce the reliance of Cuba on foreign aid from the USSR. She performed voluntary work in the cane fields, and planted citrus trees and coffee, joining the militia units. When it became evident that the economic policies of the government were not working, those who had criticized the regime were arrested. Surduts was held for three months and then deported in 1971, returning to France.

Surduts tried working as a freelance translator, but having been out of the country for so long, she had no network. She joined the radical left party, Revolution!, which would later become the Revolutionary Communist League. Activists working with factory workers referred her to the fr:Mouvement pour la liberté de l'avortement et de la contraception MLAC, where she got involved in reproductive rights. Participating in demonstrations and circulating petitions, she fought for the passage of the Veil Law in 1975. After the right to abortion was assured with the law becoming permanent in 1979, she turned her sights to reform on the laws concerning rape and incest and then in the 1980s, began pressing for changes in employment laws, to address pay inequality, job insecurity and women being forced into part-time work.

In 1990, Surduts founded and became president of the Coordination of Associations for the Right to Abortion and Contraception (French: Coordination des associations pour le droit à l'avortement et à la contraception (CADAC)) in response to repeated attacks on abortion clinics and attempts to prevent women from obtaining the legal procedures in hospitals. CADAC pressed for and obtained passage of legislation in January 1993, of a law which made impeding the right to abortion a crime. In 1995, fearing that conservatives might gain in the presidential election and protections might be rolled back, CADAC organized a demonstration to rally support for women's right to equal pay, reproductive control and equality. Forty thousand protesters gathered and sparked a movement to stop roll backs in health and retirement benefits. After the rally, the National Collective for the Rights of Women, was formed and Surduts, one of the founders, became spokeswoman for the umbrella organization.

From the turn of the decade, Surduts continued to work to maintain women's right to reproductive decisions, but pressed for approval of laws to guarantee minors the right to contraception and abortion, which passed in 2001; legislation to protect women from domestic violence, which passed in 2010; protested proposed closings of public hospitals in 2013; and worked on reforms of the laws on prostitution, which were being considered by the legislature at the time of her death.

== Death and legacy ==
Surduts died on 13 April 2016 in Paris after a brief illness. Though mainly remembered for her fight to secure reproductive rights for women, she saw herself as a permanent revolutionary fighting for the human rights of those who were exploited or discriminated against because of systemic biases.
