= Federation of the Three Classes of Steam =

The Federation of the Three Classes of Steam (Spanish: Federación de las Tres Clases de Vapor) was a labor organization that was formed in Barcelona in August 1869 with the union of the societies of the spinning machines operators, day laborers and mechanical weavers of the Barcelona textile companies. Tomàs Valls was the secretary of the interim commission and the publication El Obrero was the union's organ of expression. The "Three Classes" in the name of the organization referred to three trades and the "Steam" referred to working with steam-driven machines.

== Creation ==
In August 1869, the union made itself known by presenting a table of wage demands of the manufacturers of Barcelona. Their force spread rapidly throughout all the manufacturing districts of the Principality and the first state workers' congress, organized by the Federal Center of Workers' Societies of Barcelona in June 1870, was attended by the unions' delegates from different towns (Sellent, Sant Andreu, Vilanova i la Geltrú). At the end of December 1870, they held their first congress in which a regulation was approved with the guidelines of the Spanish Regional Federation of the IWA (FRE-AIT). At that time they had 8,500 members, Climent Bové was president and Narcís Mas was secretary. In March 1871 they joined the FRE-AIT, with the same president and Anselm Valentí as secretary. One of the most important struggles of this period, promoted by the Three Classes Federation, was the fifteen-week strike in Villanueva y Geltrú, which affected 1,400 workers. On February 4 and 5, 1872, they held their second congress, where they unanimously approved the regulation of strikes and the federation with the Society of Weavers by hand, to form the Union of Manufacturing Workers. Josep Bragulat was elected president and Tomàs Valls secretary. Later, between May 7 and 11, 1872, the Constituent Congress of the Union of Manufacturing Workers (or Manufacturing Union) was held in Barcelona, with the attendance of 115 delegates representing some 28,000 members. A 14-member Board of Directors format was appointed, which was established in Manresa. General Manuel Pavía's coup d'état dismantled the Three Classes of Steam and also the Manufacturing Union. At the beginning of 1881 the Three Classes of Steam were reorganized and elections were held in May for the positions of secretary and general representative, with Antoni Casulà and Joan Vidal being elected respectively.

== Turn to Marxism ==
The Federation was distancing itself from the anarchist positions of the FRE-AIT and approaching marxist positions. This trend caused the split of the Manufacturing Union in March 1882 when it joined the Federation of Workers of the Spanish Region (FTRE), with Josep Bragulat as general representative. In May 1882 the Three Classes of Steam suffered another split by the Sabadell section, which in January 1883 joined the Manufacturing Union. In August 1882, the Three Steam Classes attended a National Workers' Congress called by the marxists, with the participation of 123 delegates representing 152 workers' societies and around 15,000 workers. The Three Steam Classes with 14 delegates and about 8,000 members was the largest delegation. It was agreed to set up the National Association of Workers of Spain, which intended to bring together workers' societies and trade federations, an idea on which the Unión General de Trabajadores (UGT) would be formed years later. However, the Three Steam Classes did not follow the Marxist guidelines either, since when the UGT was founded in 1888 they did not join and when the socialists convened in Paris the Congress that founded the Second International in July 14–21, 1889, the representatives of the Three Steam Classes went to the Congress of the Possibilists (with the English Trade-Unions, also in Paris July 15–20).

In 1890, they responded to the lockout against the Manresa workers by declaring a strike in the Barcelona sections and 22 other locations in the Principality of Catalonia, affecting more than 50,000 workers from March 22 to 31. The strike flared up again when on July 12 the representatives of the Three Steam Classes were dismissed from the Manresa factories. The protest strike that was decreed, almost unexpectedly, was supported not only by the sections of the Three Steam Classes but also by those of cotton, palettes, locksmiths, dyers, carpenters and shoemakers. But with the help of the government and police repression, this second part of the strike was a disaster for the Three Steam Classes, which gradually lost members and sections.

At the end of 1890, the Manresa and Sant Martí de Provencals sections were split. In 1895, the Union of the Cotton Industry, an organization of Mataró and its region, left the Federation and joined the UGT. In 1909, at an assembly of the Federation of the Art Industry of Catalonia in Barcelona, representatives of the Three Steam Classes of Torelló, Sant Martí de Provencals, Badalona and Manresa attended, without a clear relationship between them. The sections of the Federation were later absorbed by the UGT and the Confederación Nacional del Trabajo (CNT).
