= Nalini Nayak =

Indian feminist activist

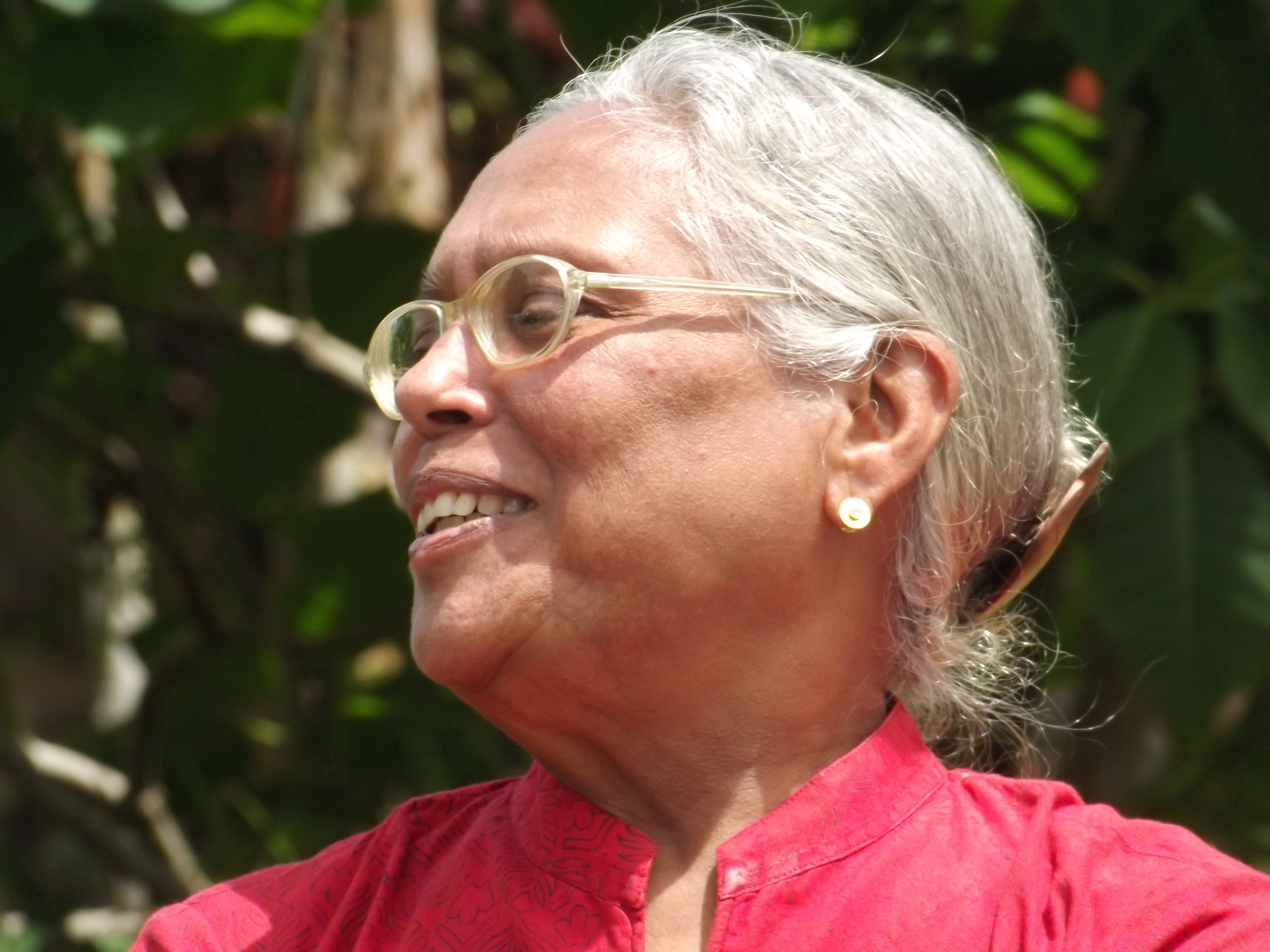
Nalini Nayak

Nalini Nayak is an activist, feminist and trade unionist based in Kerala, India. She has been involved with coastal communities and their issues for over three decades, associated with Protsahan Trivandrum, Mitraniketan Vagamon and the Self Employed Women's Association.

== Work ==
Nayak is a founder member of the International Collective in Support of Fishworkers, where she has taken the initiative to collectively evolve a feminist perspective in fisheries. She is at present, the general secretary of the Self Employed Women's Association, Kerala, of which she was a joint founder.

== Writings and research ==
- The Coasts, the Fish Resources and the Fishworkers’ Movement by Nalini Nayak and A. J. Vijayan
- Getting Their Act Together : India: Co-management
- Women in the Ratnagiri Cooperative in Maharashtra, India in ICSF (International Collective in Support of Fishworkers)
- Professionalising Domestic Services: SEWA Kerala on Labourlife
