= Warcry (activist) =

Indian-American activist

- Born: Priya Reddy; India
- Years active: 1998–present
- Known for: Earth First! old-growth forest defense; NYC Indymedia; NYC Anarchist Film Festival; NYC Anarchist Bookfair
- Notable work: Global Uprising (essay)
- Movement: Anarchism, environmentalism, anti-globalization

Warcry (born Priya Reddy) is an Indian-American environmentalist and anarchist activist, filmmaker, writer and political organizer.

== Life and work ==
As a child, Warcry emigrated with her parents from India to the United States. She attended college in the Bay Area, where she was influenced by the writings of anarchist Emma Goldman.

=== Will, Luers and Earth First! ===
In May 1998 Warcry worked with Earth First! In an ancient forest defense campaign in Oregon to preserve and protect old-growth forests from loggers. She met and befriended activists Brad Will and Jeff Luers at a tree-sit protest. It was here she adopted her sobriquet, as a conscious response to hippie-like tree-sitters such as Julia Butterfly Hill. Initially grounded due to her inability to climb, Warcry spent three weeks living on a platform neighboring Will's, and went on to live and work with Will on a number of video and print projects. Warcry and Will both worked with the NYC Indymedia collective until May 2001. In 2000 Luers was arrested and convicted of burning three SUVs in a statement against global warming and in 2001 was sentenced to more than 22 years in prison.

=== Media activism ===
Warcry is an advocate of "democratizing corporate controlled media" and has worked with MediaChannel.Org and other media watch dog and free speech advocacy groups to organize a democratic media movement in the U.S. She was involved with the indymedia project since its inception in Seattle during the anti-WTO riots in 1999. She has since worked as an investigative reporter, exposing the systematic torture at Abu Ghraib. Warcry has also worked as a documentary filmmaker covering topics ranging from climate change to human rights in Palestine to dissent and protest in the United States, including the direct action based radical environmental movement. Warcry has her own film production company, Warcry Cinema, She founded the first New York anarchist film festival in April 2007. Every year since, Warcry has organized the NYC Anarchist Film Festival as an educational political forum in conjunction with the NYC Anarchist Bookfair which she helped to co-found. Warcry has also been a radio producer with the Pacifica Network, producing shows on women's rights movements in the Middle East. Warcry also covered the G8 protests in Scotland in 2005 and the riots at the 2005 European Social Forum in Athens, Greece. Warcry's essay, "My Family Wears Black" about anarchists in the anti-globalization movement appears in a book called Global Uprising: Confronting the Tyrannies of the 21st Century.

== Media appearances ==
- Breaking the Spell (film) (1999)
- This Is What Democracy Looks Like (2000)
  - Freidberg, Jill (2000), Interview with Priya Reddy - Independent Media Center World Trade Organization Footage, doi:10.6069/dyxn-8736
- Peterson, M'chelle (2001-04-02). "Free-trade protesters find roadblock at border". The Press Republican.
- "Keepers of the Flame", The Village Voice 2002
- Jeff "Free" Luers was Sentenced to 22 Years in Prison for Burning 3 SUVs Democracy Now!, July 17, 2003
- "What It Looks Like...the Final Frames". Esquire. 2007-06-16.
