= Ottilie von Bistram =

Baltic German writer and teacher

Ottilie Alexandrine Helene von Bistram (July 8, 1859 in Riga – July 19, 1931 in Bayreuth) was a Baltic German writer and teacher from the Russian Empire. She was also a pioneer in the struggle for female access to education.

== Life ==
Bistram was born as the daughter of Konstantin Friedrich Johann Freiherr von Bistram (1924-1906), a writer and hydropath, and Mathilde Friederike von Bistram (née Stillmark, 1832-1892) in Riga, Latvia, which was part of the Russian Empire at the time. She moved to Dresden with her family as a young child, where she was raised and educated. Later on, she studied literature, art history, anatomy and orthopaedics and passed her Staatsexamen. Afterwards, Bistram moved to Switzerland.

She became increasingly concerned with the role of women and advocated for advanced education for girls. In Frauenbildung, Frauenstudium (1893), she called for the right of women to study at university. At the International Women's Congress in Berlin in 1897, she gave a lecture on the first girls‘ grammar school, which was located in Karlsruhe, and subsequently gave regular lectures at girls’ grammar schools, which is how ‘she made a name for herself [among contemporaries]’. In a publication, she dealt with the anti-feminist work Über den physiologischen Schwachsinn des Weibes by Paul Julius Möbius, who then referred to her rebuttal in the preface to the 5th edition of his work, describing the work as ‘too disorganised for me to give an excerpt’.

Bistram, who had already travelled the world with her parents as a small child, continued to travel regularly to various countries in later years, where she studied the social situation of women. She published her findings in the form of travel sketches in newspapers and magazines. She also published articles on the question of women's rights as well as stories and poems.

She was also a lecturer in literature and art history in Dresden and Wiesbaden and an editor for the journal Deutsche Warte in Berlin.

Around 1900, she was chairwoman of the ‘Women's Education Department’ association in Wiesbaden.

She died in Bayreuth in 1931.

== Works ==
- Ueber den physiologischen Schwachsinn des Weibes. Eine Entgegnung. Berlin 1892.
- Frauenbildung, Frauenstudium. Vortrag. Lucas, Elberfeld 1893.
- Das erste Mädchengymnasium zu Karlsruhe. 1897.
- Zur Frauenfrage. 1899.
- Die Frau des neuen Jahrhunderts. 1900.
- Ibsen's Nora und die wahre Emanzipation der Frau. Vortrag. Lützenkirchen & Bröcking, Wiesbaden 1900.
