= Valerie Smith (social activist) =

Canadian anti-pornography activist

Valerie Smith is a Canadian social activist who lobbies against violent pornography, violent rap music, and other allegedly misogynist content in Canadian media. She is best known for trying to prevent Eminem from entering Canada for a concert in October 2000 because of his misogynist lyrics. She has also lobbied to have the Canadian Radio-television and Telecommunications Commission (CRTC) use existing legislation that she believed should censor Howard Stern. She is the author of the Action Agenda: A Strategic Blueprint for Reducing Exposure to Media Violence in Canada, a report funded and published by the Ontario Office for Victims of Crime, an agency of the Ministry of the Attorney General. Smith operates the Free Radical web site to provide information on violent media and strategies to combat it.

== Activism ==
Smith successfully lobbied Bell Mobility to get them to cease selling "Pimptones", skits of "pimps, players, and hos" retailed for $2.50 to replace standard ringtones. After two complaints, Bell Mobility stopped offering the tones.

In 2005, Smith filed a complaint with the Ontario Human Rights Commission against Canadian music retailer HMV, criticizing the company for selling what Smith called "hate rap". Smith alleged that HMV was selling music that contained lyrics that were misogynistic. The Ontario Human Rights Tribunal recommended that Smith's case not be heard at a formal trial as the allegations were found not contrary to the Ontario Human Rights Code.

Later in 2005, Smith attempted to prevent the 50 Cent biopic, Get Rich or Die Tryin', from receiving tax breaks for filming in Toronto. Smith argued that the film glorified gun violence and that it was unfair to use the money of tax payers, some of whom lived with gang violence, to fund a film that could incite violent behaviour.

=== Criticism of Eminem ===
In 2000, Smith wrote to the Hate Crimes Unit in Toronto claiming that Eminem "promotes hatred and advocates violence against women in his lyrics". Smith particularly took issue with the song "Kill You". The complaint was subsequently referred to the Attorney General of Ontario, Jim Flaherty, to see if the lyrics directly promoted violence in a way that contradicted Canada's criminal code. The Attorney General's office moved forward with motions to bar Eminem from performing his Toronto concert.

Smith and Flaherty's criticisms did not keep Eminem from performing in October 2000 as the Toronto police did not find that the singer's lyrics met criteria warranting legal action. At the concert, Eminem dedicated his song "The Way I Am" to Smith, saying "I dedicate this next song to that bitch Valerie Smith." though this remark did not bother Smith. After opening the concert with "Kill You", Eminem said to the crowd, "Bet you didn't think I was going to do that one, did you?".
