= Kathy Ferguson =

American political theorist

Kathy E. Ferguson is an American author, political theorist, educator, and Fulbright Grant recipient. She is professor of political science and women's studies at the University of Hawaiʻi at Mānoa.

In 2009, the American Political Science Association recognized Ferguson for her research in the field of feminist political theory. Her more notable books include Emma Goldman: Political Thinking in the Streets (2011), The Man Question: Visions of Subjectivity in Feminist Theory (1993), and Kibbutz Journal: Reflections on Gender, Race and Militarism in Israel, a work of political theory written in the personal essay form while living with her husband and two young sons on a kibbutz in Israel.

Ferguson's writing often brings activist strategies and tactics, feminist cultural artifacts, and practices of domestic or everyday life into the canon of political theory.

== Early life and education ==
Ferguson received a B.A. in political science in 1972 from Purdue University. She received a doctorate in political science from the University of Minnesota in 1976, writing the first feminist dissertation in the department.

Ferguson has taught at Siena College in Albany, New York, the Institute for Advanced Studies in Vienna, Austria, and the University of Gothenburg, Sweden. She currently teaches at the University of Hawaiʻi, where she serves as Chair of the Political Science Department.

Ferguson received a Fulbright appointment at Ben Gurion University in Beer Sheva, Israel in 1999.

In 2009, The American Political Science Association's Women and Political Research Section awarded her the Okin-Young Prize, recognizing the year's "best paper on feminist political theory published in an English language academic journal." The award recognized an article that would serve as the basis for the book Emma Goldman: Political Thinking in the Streets. The book was the result of research conducted with the help of the Emma Goldman Papers Project at the University of California, Berkeley.

Ferguson is involved with the International Dyslexia Association in which she volunteers to tutor dyslexic children and adults.

== Research and publications ==
Ferguson's research intertwines feminist theory and political science. Her books include:

- Ferguson, Kathy E. (2023). Letterpress Revolution : The Politics of Anarchist Print Culture. Durham: Duke University Press.
- Emma Goldman: Political Thinking in the Streets, written in 2011.
- Gender and Globalization in Asia and the Pacific, co-edited with Monique Mironesco 2008.
- Oh, Say, Can You See? The Semiotics of the Military in Hawaii, written with Phyllis Turnbull 1995.
- Kibbutz Journal: Reflections on Gender, Race and Militarism in Israel, written in 1995.
- The Man Question: Visions of Subjectivity in Feminist Theory, written in 1993.
- The Feminist Case Against Bureaucracy, written in 1984.
- Ferguson, Kathy E. (October 2008). "Discourses of Danger: Locating Emma Goldman". Political Theory. 36 (5). University of Hawaii, Honolulu: 735–761. JSTOR 20452663.
- Ferguson, Kathy E. (Spring 2011). "Gender and Genre in Emma Goldman". Signs. 36 (3). The University of Chicago Press: 733–757. JSTOR 10.1086/657497.
