= Marie Hoheisel =

Austrian women's rights activist (1873–1947)

Marie Hoheisel (born Maria Perzina: 16 June 1873 – 5 March 1947) was an Austrian women's rights activist.

== Life ==
The daughter of Julius Perzina and Emmi Ehrlich von Treuenstätt, Maria Perzina was born in Reichenberg, at that time a major commercial and industrial city in Austrian northern Bohemia (and known after 1945 as Liberec in Czechoslovakia). She grew up in Vienna where she attended a teacher training college, which she left in 1892.

Around this time she married Konrad Hoheisel, a talented and ambitious official in the imperial postal service, and the couple moved to Trieste in connection with Konrad's work. In 1907 Konrad's work caused them to relocate to Linz. In 1910 her husband was moved again, taking the couple, accompanied by this time by their two children Konrad and Emmi, back to Vienna where by 1918 Konrad Hoheisel had become national General Director for posts and telecommunications.

While they were living in Linz Marie Hohenheisel began working to improve living conditions for women. She concerned herself with wage levels and working conditions and also demanded better status and recognition by society for the work undertaken by women as wives and mothers. From her published articles and lectures/speeches from those years it is evident that her over-riding goal was legislative backing for the equal standing of men and women in the workplace and in society. In Vienna, supported by the pioneering feminist activist Marianne Hainisch, from 1926 she focused on the campaign to introduce a US-style Mother's Day to the country. In 1928 she became chair of the Austrian Mothers' Day committee. Three years later she also took on the presidency of the League of Austrian Women's Associations ("Bund Österreichischer Frauenvereine" / BÖF), a position she retained till the League's dissolution in 1938 following the 1938 merger ("Anschluss") of Austria into Nazi Germany.

In 1934 Hoheisel was also elected to the national committee of the "Women's Emergency Services" ("Frauen-Notdienst"). She also took a leading role in the Austrian ("Consumers' League") "Konsumentenliga". In 1937 an article that she contributed to a specialist journal entitled "Food price inflation, dual income legislation and their impact on socio-political issues" ("Lebensmittelteuerung und Doppelverdienergesetz und ihre bevölkerungspolitischen Folgen") dealt with themes that are as important today as they were in 1937.

At the time of the "Anschluss" Hoheisel was in her mid-60s. She lost or surrendered from her public appointments and for most purposes disappears from the public record. She died in Vienna in 1947.

== Significance ==
By a circuitous route, papers comprising Marie Hoheisel's "literary legacy" came into the possession of the Vienna Public Library and were transferred to the public archives at the City Hall in 2013. The resulting archive incorporates approximately 500 hand-written and typed documents that she produced, mostly during the period 1928-1936. Along with texts by Hoheisel, the archive contains written material from other feminist activist of the time, providing insights into the workings of the feminist network in Austria and internationally. The public accessibility of the archive has opened the way to a wider appreciation of a women's rights activists whose contribution had been largely overlooked during the Nazi years and in the turmoil generated by the war and its politically charged aftermath.
