= Llibertat Ródenas =

Spanish anarcho-syndicalist and feminist activist

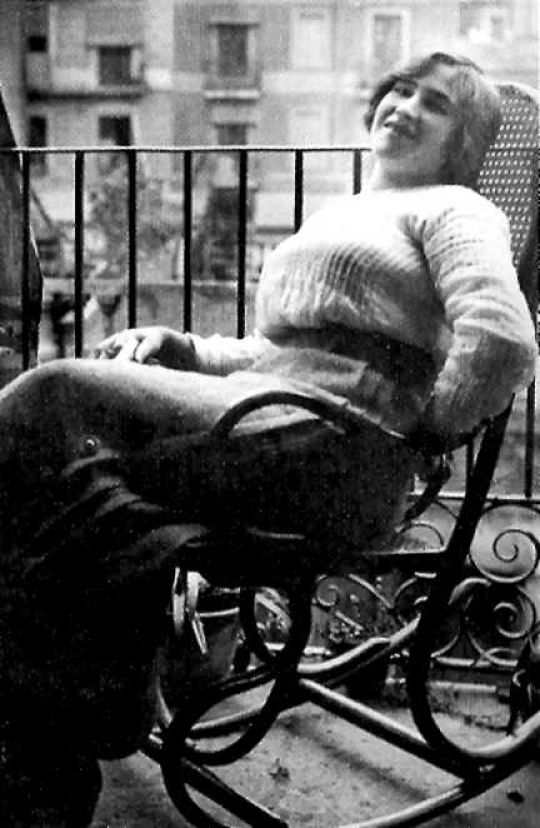
- Born: 23 September 1892; Chera, Spain
- Died: 19 January 1970 (aged 77); Mexico
- Organization(s): Confederación Nacional del Trabajo; Federación Anarquista Ibérica; Mujeres Libres
- Movement: Anarchism, Feminism, Anti-fascism

Llibertat Ródenas Domínguez (Note: Some sources give her second surname as Rodríguez, but official documentation confirms that her mother's surname was Domínguez.) (1892–1970) was a Valencian anarcho-syndicalist and feminist activist.

== Biography ==
Ródenas was the daughter of an anticlerical republican, and studied at a secular school. Coming from Chera, Valencia, she moved to Barcelona in 1918 where she came into contact with the Confederación Nacional del Trabajo (CNT) and carried out various propaganda campaigns. She was soon noted for her public speaking skills during the years of the First World War. In 1919 she campaigned in Catalonia with Josep Viadiu i Vendrell and Felipe Barjau i Riera, and in Valencia with Eusebi Carbó i Carbó, making known the philosophy and organization of Autonomous Trade Unions.

In 1920, after some rallies, she was imprisoned in Manresa for three months, and was imprisoned again in Guadalajara shortly after her release for publicly denouncing the abuses of General Severiano Martínez Anido as civil governor in Barcelona. Ródenas, who participated in committees to help prisoners, harshly criticized the Ley de Fugas, which had become a way of eliminating people who were against the regime. Beginning in 1931, she campaigned actively on behalf of the Federación Anarquista Ibérica (FAI).

In 1932, she became the partner of the CNT militant Josep Viadiu, with whom she had three children. When the Spanish Civil War broke out in 1936, she enlisted in the Durruti Column and went to fight on the Zaragoza front with other volunteers from the CNT and the FAI. There she was responsible for the evacuation of Aragonese children. But after internal conflicts within the republican side, the army became militarized, and one of the first measures taken was to exclude women from the front. Thus, images of militiawomen were eliminated from propaganda posters and in their place appeared images of women dedicated to social assistance tasks, in the rear. This rejection motivated her entry to the Mujeres Libres group, which combined the libertarian struggle with the feminist.

Ródenas believed that the destruction of stereotypical gender roles passed through education and actively participated in the tasks of literacy and specialized training of the Casal de la Mujer Trabajadora, where between 600 and 800 women attended classes. In 1939, she went into exile in France, then in Santo Domingo and finally settled in Mexico from where she was reunited with her young son since, during the war, she had sent her three children to the Soviet Union. Her other two children died fighting nazism in the Siege of Leningrad.
