= Méchin =

Méchin is a French surname. Notable people with the surname include:

- Alexandre Méchin (1772–1849), senior French official and politician
- Jacques Benoist-Méchin (1901–1983), French journalist, historian, musicologist and politician
- Guillaume Méchin (died 1328), French prelate

== See also ==
- Méchins
- Mechain (disambiguation)
