= Cavaignac =

Cavaignac is a surname. Notable people with the surname include:

- Jean-Baptiste Cavaignac (1762–1829), French politician
  - His eldest son, Eleonore Louis Godefroi Cavaignac (1801–1845), journalist
  - His second son, Louis Eugène Cavaignac (1802–1857), general and politician
    - Louis Eugène's son, Jacques Marie Eugène Godefroy Cavaignac (1853–1905), politician
- Jean Baptiste's (1762–1829) brother, Jean-Baptiste Cavaignac de Lalande (1765–1845), politician
- Jean Baptiste's (1762–1829) brother, Jacques-Marie, vicomte Cavaignac (1773–1855), general
