= Ernest Christophe =

French sculptor

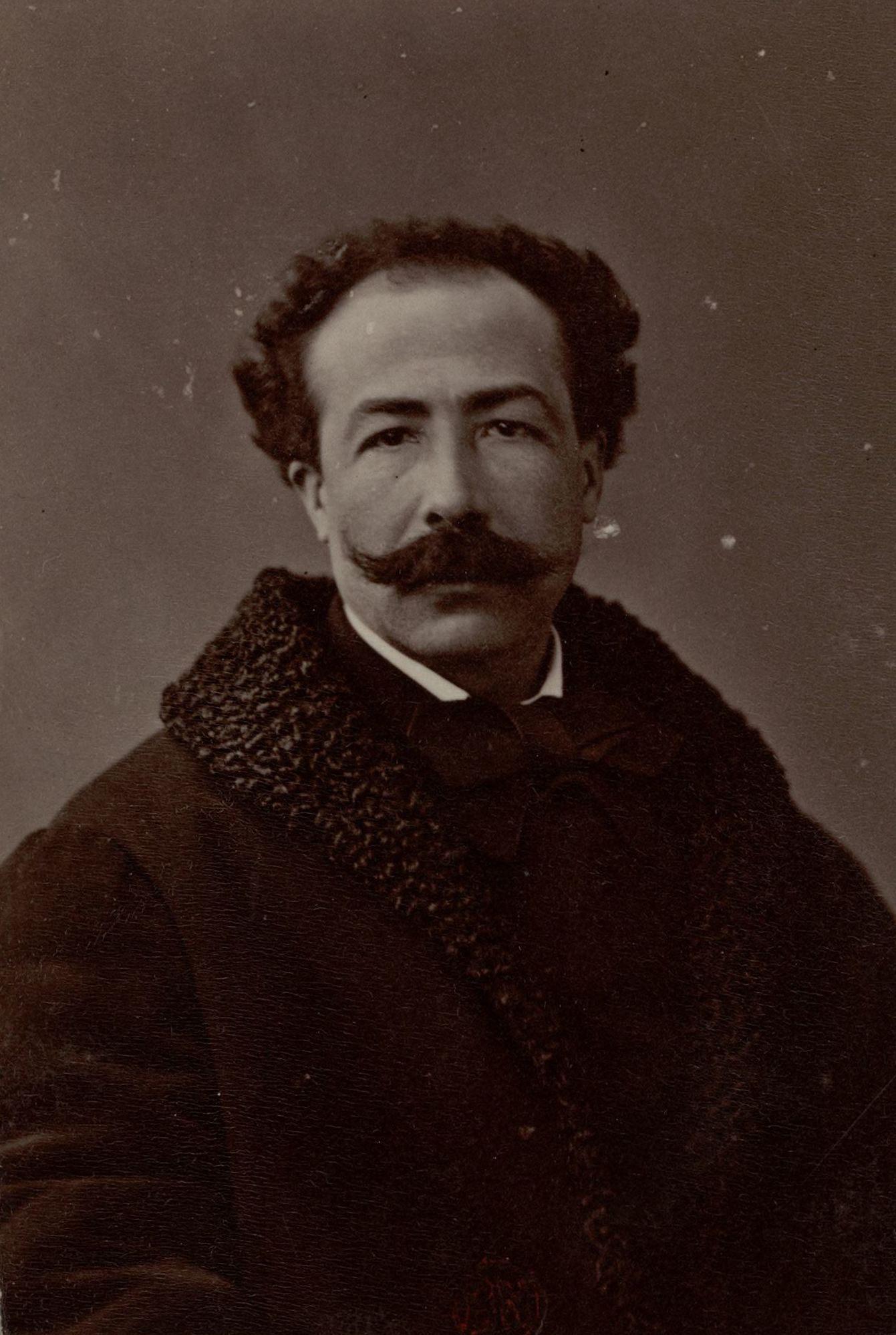
- Photograph of Christophe by Nadar
- Born: Ernest Louis Aquilas Christophe; 15 January 1827; Loches, Indre-et-Loire, France
- Died: 14 January 1892 (aged 64); 17th arrondissement of Paris, France
- Resting place: Batignolles Cemetery; 48.897°N 2.314°E
- Known for: Sculpture
- Notable work: The Human Comedy

Ernest Louis Aquilas Christophe (15 January 1827 – 14 January 1892) was a French sculptor, a student of François Rude and a friend of Charles Baudelaire. Rude assigned him to help with the bronze recumbent effigy to Éléonore-Louis Godefroi Cavaignac, a French politician. The funerary monument is signed Rude et Christophe, son jeune élève (Rude and Christophe, his young pupil). His Le Masque (the Mask) sculpture won Christophe third place in the Paris Salon in 1876 and two of his sculptures, La Fatalité (Fatality) and Le Baiser suprême (The supreme kiss) were acquired by the Musée du Luxembourg.

Christophe developed a deep friendship with Cuban-born French poet José-Maria de Heredia and made him his testamentary legatee. De Heredia collected part of Ernest's library after his death. He is buried in the Batignolles Cemetery.

== Notable works ==
One of Christophe's most recognized works is the Human Comedy sculpture that he submitted in 1876 to the Paris Salon. The Statue was acquired and exposed in the Jardin des Tuileries in 1877 and was moved to the Orsay museum since 1986 after restoration works in the Louvre. The sculpture inspired Christophe's friend Charles Baudelaire to write his poem Le Masque (the Mask). The sculptor renamed his statue "The Mask" with a nod to Baudelaire's ekphrastic poem. The work depicts a semi-nude woman whose smiling face is really a mask that hides "a face of sorrow".

La Fatalité, a statue executed by Christophe in 1885, inspired another French poet Leconte de Lisle's poem of the same title.

== Gallery ==
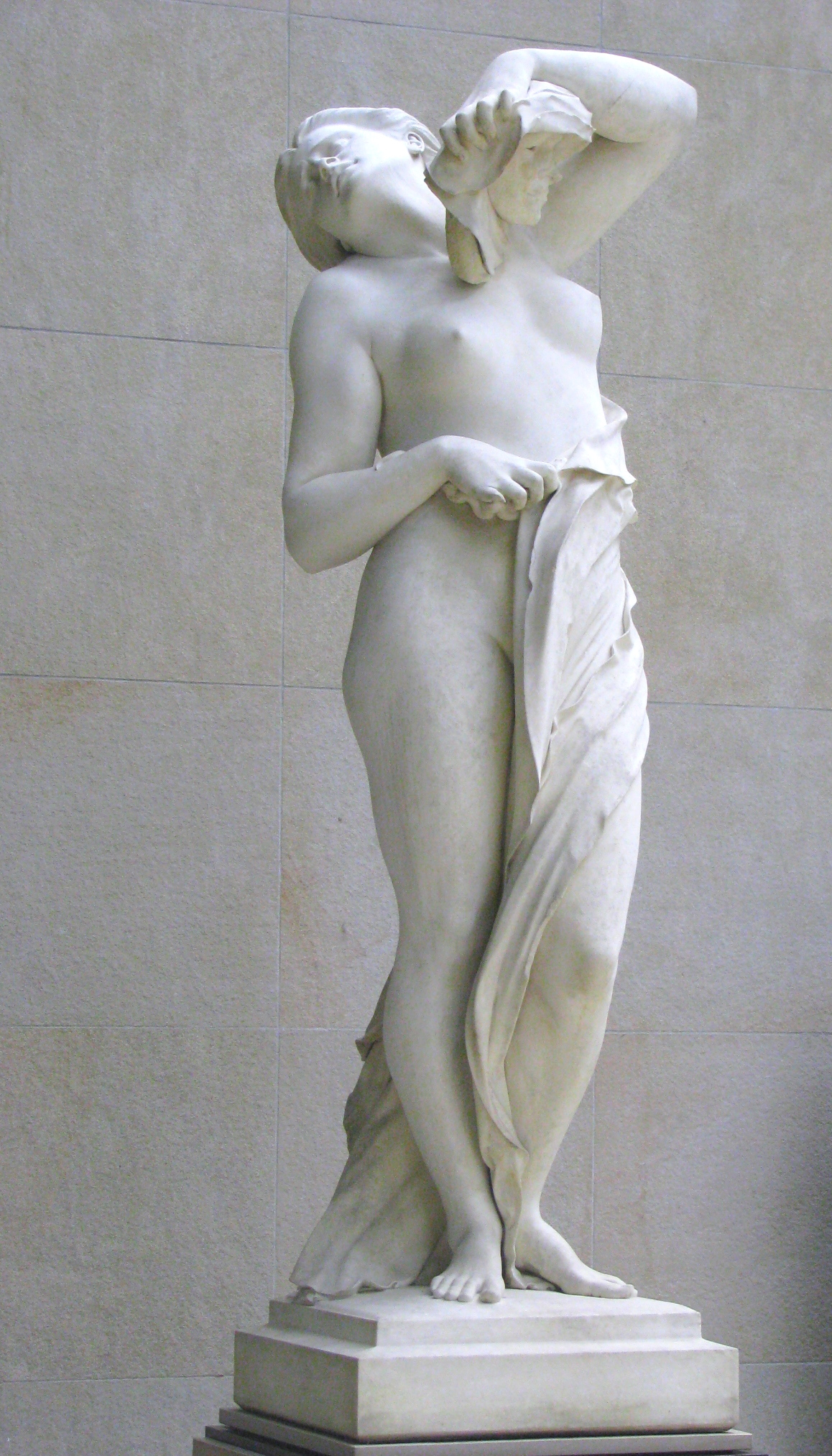
The Human Comedy - The Mask, 1876, marble, Musée d'Orsay, Paris

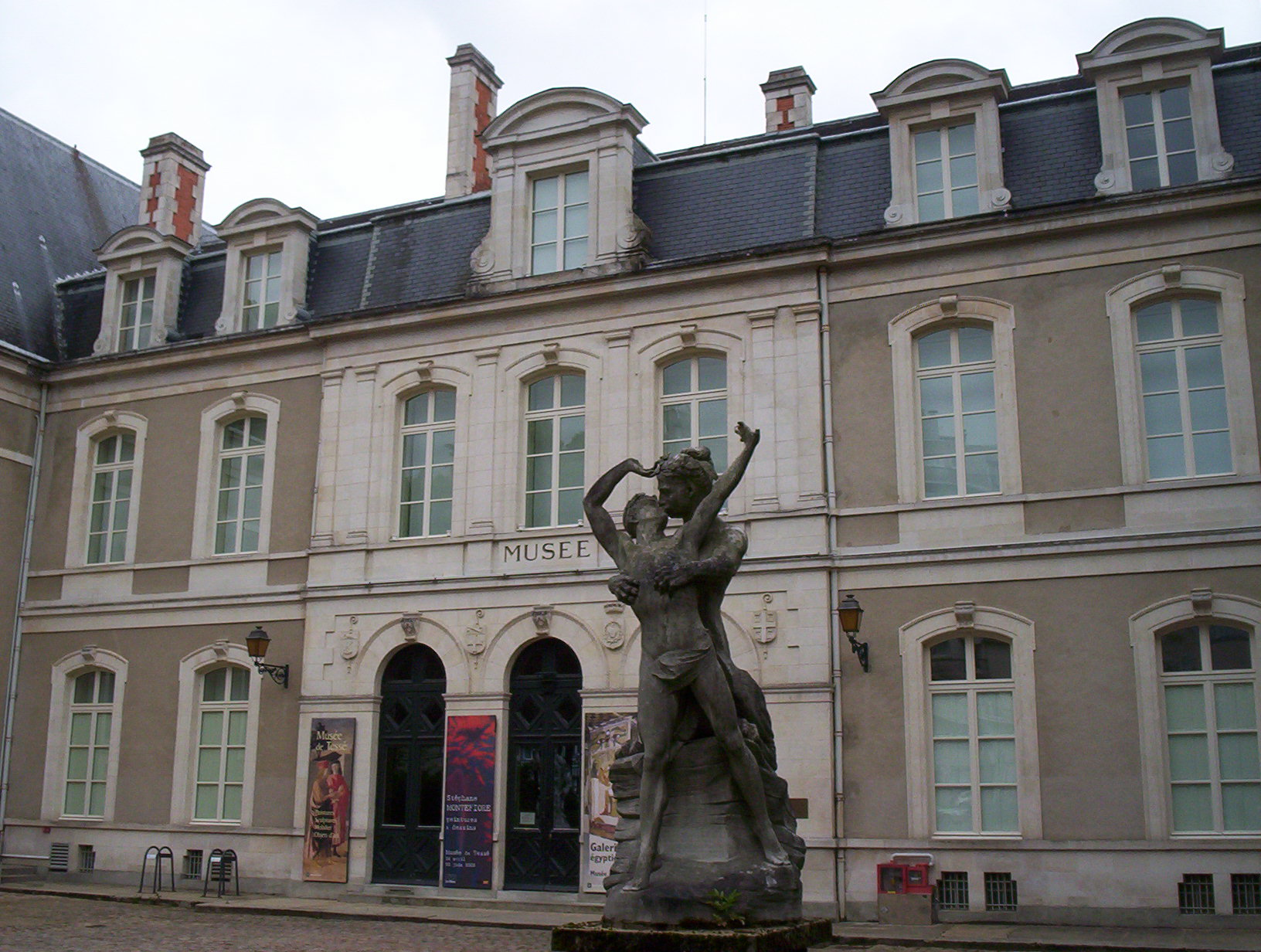
Le baiser suprême

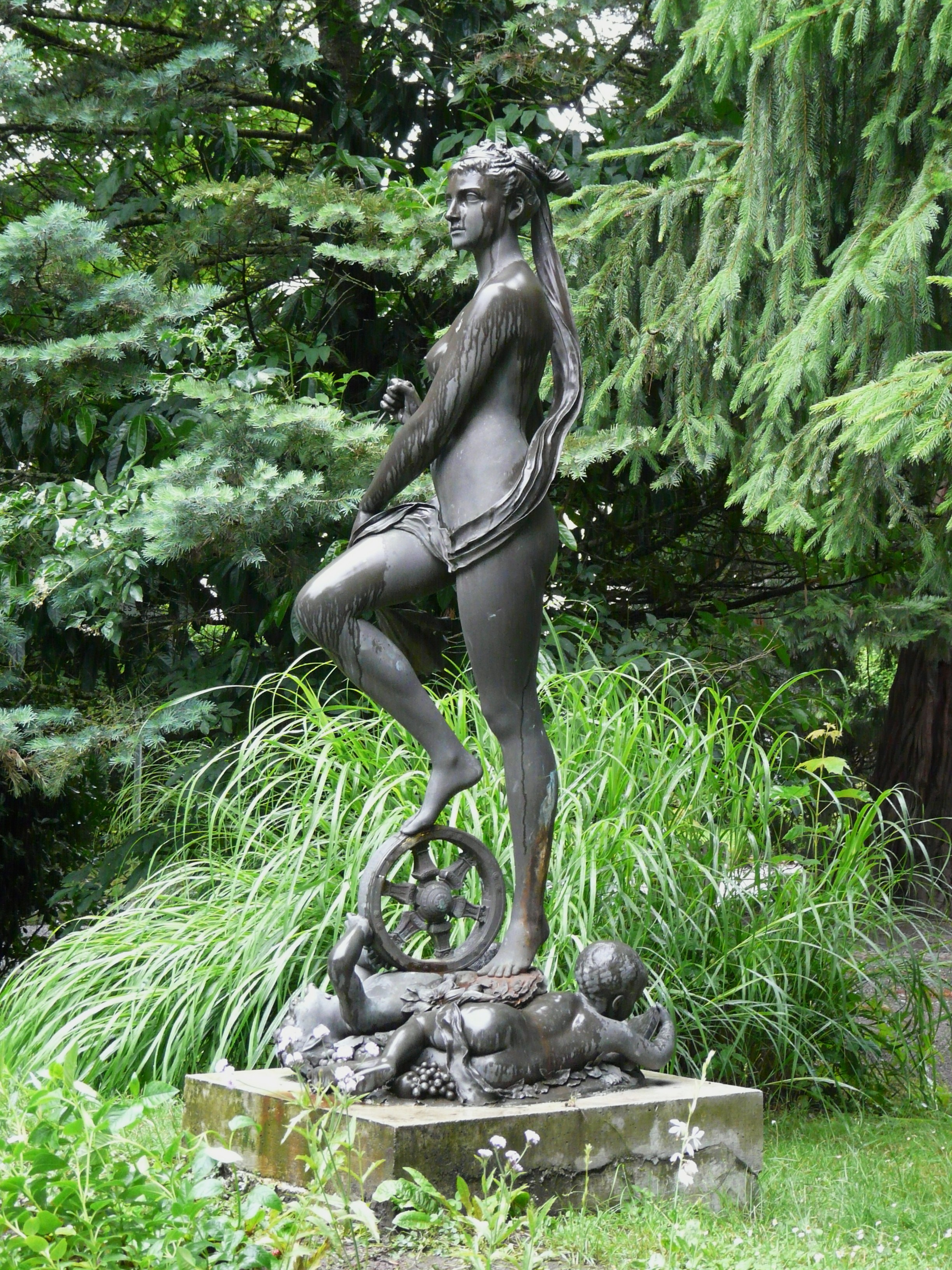
La Fatalité

== Bibliography ==
- Bénézit, Emmanuel (1999). Dictionnaire critique et documentaire des peintres, sculpteurs, dessinateurs et graveurs de tous les temps et de tous les pays par un groupe d'écrivains spécialistes français et étrangers (in French). Vol. 3. Gründ. ISBN 9782700030433.
- Lindsay, Suzanne G. (2012). Funerary Arts and Tomb Cult: Living with the Dead in France, 1750–1870. Ashgate Publishing. ISBN 9781409422617.
- McGowan, James (2008). "Explanatory notes". In Baudelaire, Charles (ed.). The Flowers of Evil. Oxford World's Classics. Oxford University Press. ISBN 9780199535583.
- Mortelette, Yann (2006). José-Maria de Heredia: poète du Parnasse. Collection Colloques de la Sorbonne (in French). Presses Paris Sorbonne. ISBN 9782840504627.
- Pingeot, Anne (2000). "Sculpture and literature in nineteenth-century France". In Aspley, Keith (ed.). From Rodin to Giacometti: Sculpture and Literature in France, 1880–1950. Rodopi. ISBN 9789042004832.
- Wright, Barbara (2005). "Baudelaire's poetic journal in Les Fleurs du Mal". In Lloyd, Rosemary (ed.). The Cambridge Companion to Baudelaire. Cambridge Companions to Literature. Cambridge University Press. ISBN 9780521537827.
