= Address of the 221 =

French parliamentary address

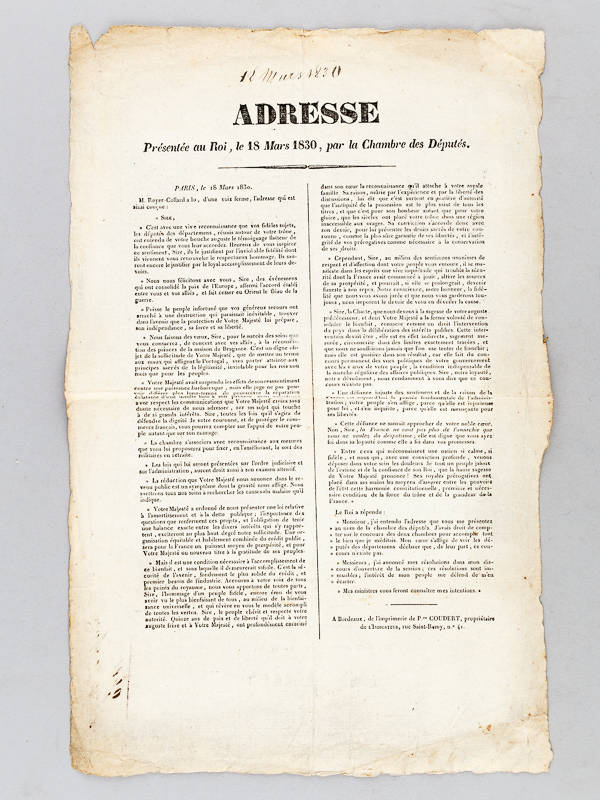
Print of the address

The Address of the 221 was a formal declaration presented to King Charles X of France by the liberal majority in the Chambre des députés on March 18, 1830, during the opening of the parliamentary session. The address signaled strong opposition to the ultra-royalist policies of the government led by Jules, Prince of Polignac. Widely regarded as a pivotal moment in the political crisis of the Bourbon Restoration, the address contributed to the tensions that culminated in the July Revolution of 1830.

== Background ==
=== Martignac Liberal Ministry ===
With the elections of November 17 and 24, 1827, the liberals became the majority in the Chambre des députés. Even though nothing was required that they do so and it was against their beliefs, they agreed to give the leadership of the ministry to the semi-liberal Viscount of Martignac. His ministry started on 4 January 1828, and although they voted into law several liberal measures, they could not stop the momentum of liberalism, and Martignac resigned after being outvoted on a legal reorganization of local governments.

=== Replacement with Polignac's Ministry ===
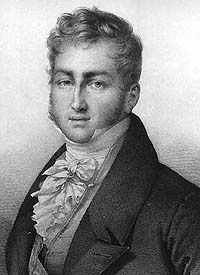
Jules, Prince of Polignac

Charles X became tired of what he considered as clear abuses of power by the Liberals and decided to impose his own candidate to the leadership of the Ministry, despite the Liberal's parliamentary majority. On August 8, 1829, Charles X appointed Jules de Polignac, his confidant and the leader of the Ultra-royalists, as Foreign Minister. Polignac quickly emerged as the leading figure of the ministry, and on November of the same year, he finally became the Prime Minister.

=== Strength of the Opposition's Press ===
The advent of the Polignac ministry preceded the founding of the Le National newspaper, which released its first issue on January 3, 1830. In the hands of people such as Adolphe Thiers, Armand Carrel, François Mignet, and Auguste Sautelet, it became the banner for liberalism. The new title was added to already well-established newspapers, such as Le Globe and Le Temps, in addition to more moderate liberal papers, such as Le Constitutionnel and the Journal des Débats.

== Address of the 221 ==
=== Debate in the Chamber ===
The address was elaborated by a specifically appointed committee. The Chamber of Deputies examined it on March 15 and 16. It was a proper motion of defiance against the Polignac Ministry and a real request for the amendment of the Charter to a parliamentary system.

On March 16. 1830, the Chamber of Deputies tabled the address and among about 402 voters, it obtained 221 votes in favor and 181 votes against. The address was adopted. Immediately, Alexandre Méchin, a Liberal Member of Parliament close to Louis Philippe I, ran to the Palais-Royal to bring the news to his patron, evidently already versed in everything.

=== Consequences for the 221 ===
Despite the secret vote, dozens of legislators were fired from their paid positions in government. Not all 221 could be identified, and disloyal bureaucrats engaged in pettifogging to delay or halt the dismissal process for others.

== Charles X's Reaction ==
=== The Reading of the Address to the Monarch ===
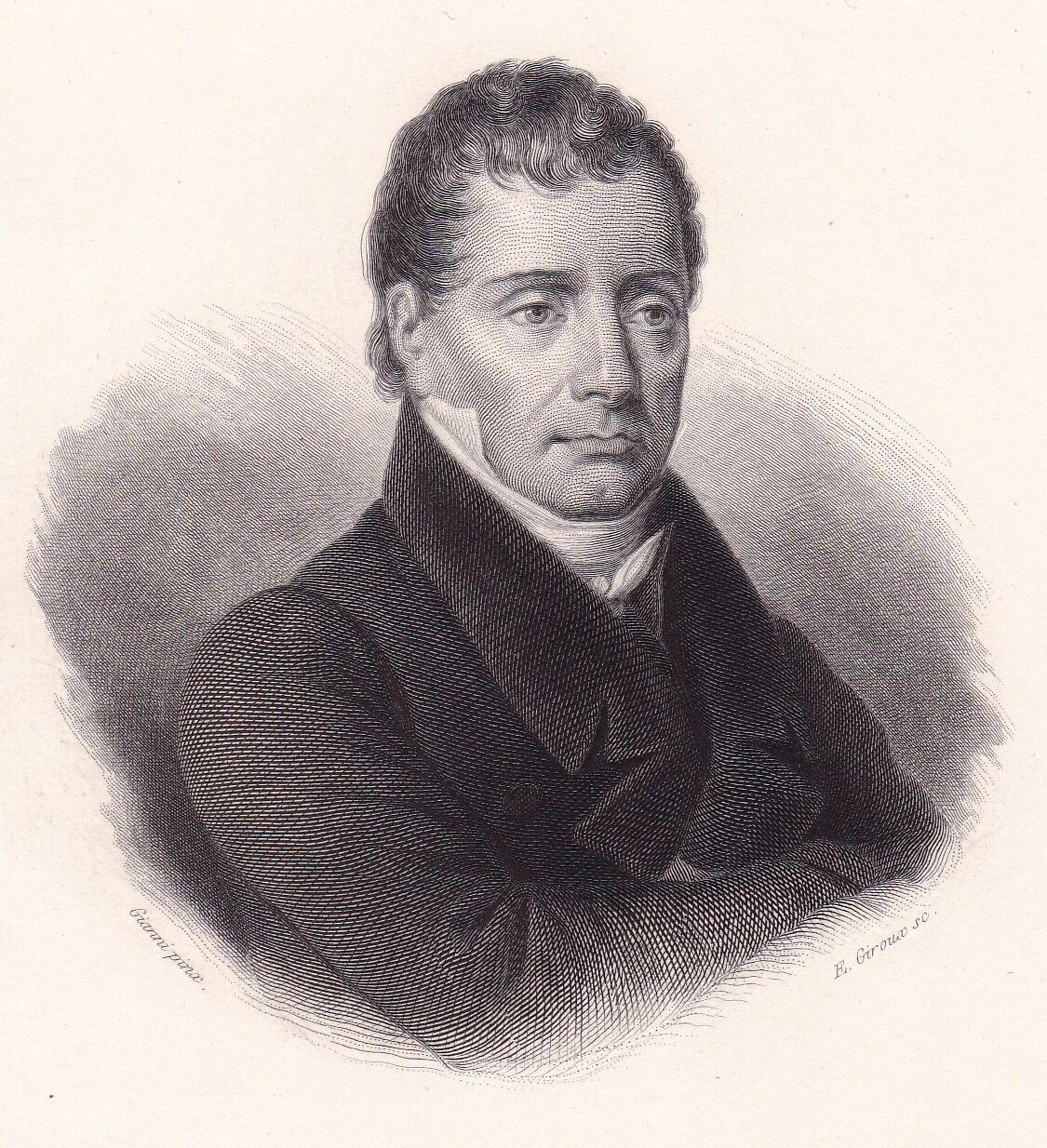
Pierre Paul Royer-Collard

Two days later, on March 18 towards the end of the morning, Charles X received at the Tuileries Palace the delegation of the Chamber of Deputies, led by President Royer-Collard, who read the address to the monarch as follows:

"Sire, it is with deep gratitude that your loyal subjects and the deputies of the departments, together around your throne, heard from your prestigious mouth the flattering testimony to the confidence that you granted them. Happy to inspire such feelings, Sire, they warrant it to the inviolable fidelity of which they will have just been renewed respectful obeisances unto You; they will even warrant it with the loyal fulfillment of their duties."

=== The Monarch's Response ===
Charles X responds:

"Lord, I have heard the address presented to me on behalf of the Chamber of Deputies. I had a right to count on the competition of the two chambers to do all the good that I was meditating; my heart grieves to see the deputies of the departments declare that, for their part, competition does not exist. Gentlemen, I have announced my resolutions in my opening speech of the session. Such resolutions are immutable; the interest of my people prevent me from walking away. My ministers will make known my intentions."

=== Consequences ===
Afterwards, Charles X tried to force his policies while remaining formally in the wording of the Charter's limits. However, the unpopularity of him and Polignac with the hung assembly caused almost nothing to pass and even a further constitutional crisis as he made decisions seemingly outside his power.

- On March 17, the next day, Charles X issued an order which updated the session of parliamentary proceedings to September 1. It was a move that complied with Section 50 of the Charter, which did not involve limitation, but only the protection from having to reconvene within three months; a time that Louis XVIII had decided was enough to settle any differences. What was missing was a common ground between two positions, that of the liberals and the ultra-royalists, both very extremist. Charles X did not come to pass to any compromise.
- Charles X attempted to follow the full path marked by Section 50; On May 16, 1830, he dissolved the assembly, relying on the judgement of the people to rebuild a majority favorable to him. However, the Liberals won the election on June 23 and July 19, gaining 274 seats, 53 more than they had before the dissolution.
- Charles X had followed the 'constitutional' path indicated by his brother and predecessor, King Louis XVIII, although he had tampered with the voting system in favor of the conservatives. However, he was not prepared for the results of the elections, which he believed would grant him a majority in the parliament for 7 years. According to the law, he then had to declare a winner and close the divide. However, Charles X and Polignac thought they would be able to use Section 14 of the Charter as a last foothold. It specified that the king "makes regulations and ordinance necessary for" the security of the state. In practice, the king's actions were a right of legislative substitute, but limited to interventions for the security of the state. Furthermore, the resulting July Ordinances from July 25 were gravely injurious to the opinions of the majority of the House, and would lead to the July Revolution.

== See also ==
- Charles X of France
- Louis Philippe I
- Bourbon Restoration
- Charter of 1814
- Ministry of Jules de Polignac
- July Revolution
- July Monarchy

== Bibliography ==
- Guy Antonetti, Louis-Philippe, Paris, Librairie Arthème Fayard, 2002 – ISBN 2-213-59222-5
- "The Revolution of 1830". Encyclopedia Britannica.
