= Jacques-Marie, vicomte Cavaignac =

French general (1773–1855)

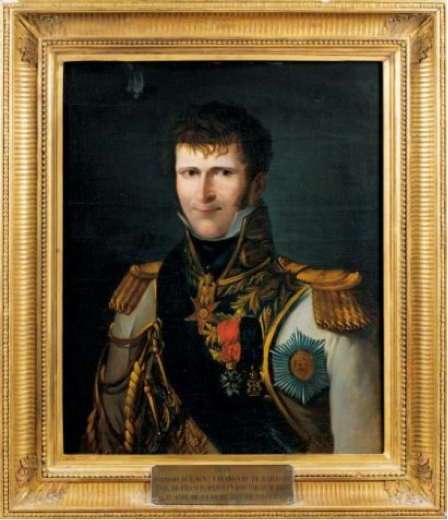
Jacque-Marie Cavaignac, vicomte Cavaignac de Baragne, an 1810 portrait. He wears the uniform of an aide de camp to the King of Naples

Jacques-Marie, vicomte Cavaignac (French pronunciation: [ʒak maʁi də kavɛɲak]; 1773–1855) was a French general. He was the brother of Jean Baptiste Cavaignac.

Jacques-Marie served with distinction in the army under the Republic and successive governments. He commanded the cavalry of the XI corps in the retreat from Moscow, and eventually became Vicomte Cavaignac and inspector-general of cavalry.
