= Mechain (disambiguation) =

Mechain is a cantref in the Kingdom of Powys.

Mechain may also refer to:

- Gwerful Mechain (fl. 1460–1502), female Welsh poet of the later Middle Ages, from Mechain
- Pierre Méchain (1744–1804), French astronomer
