= Jean-Baptiste Cavaignac =

French politician and statesman (1763–1829)

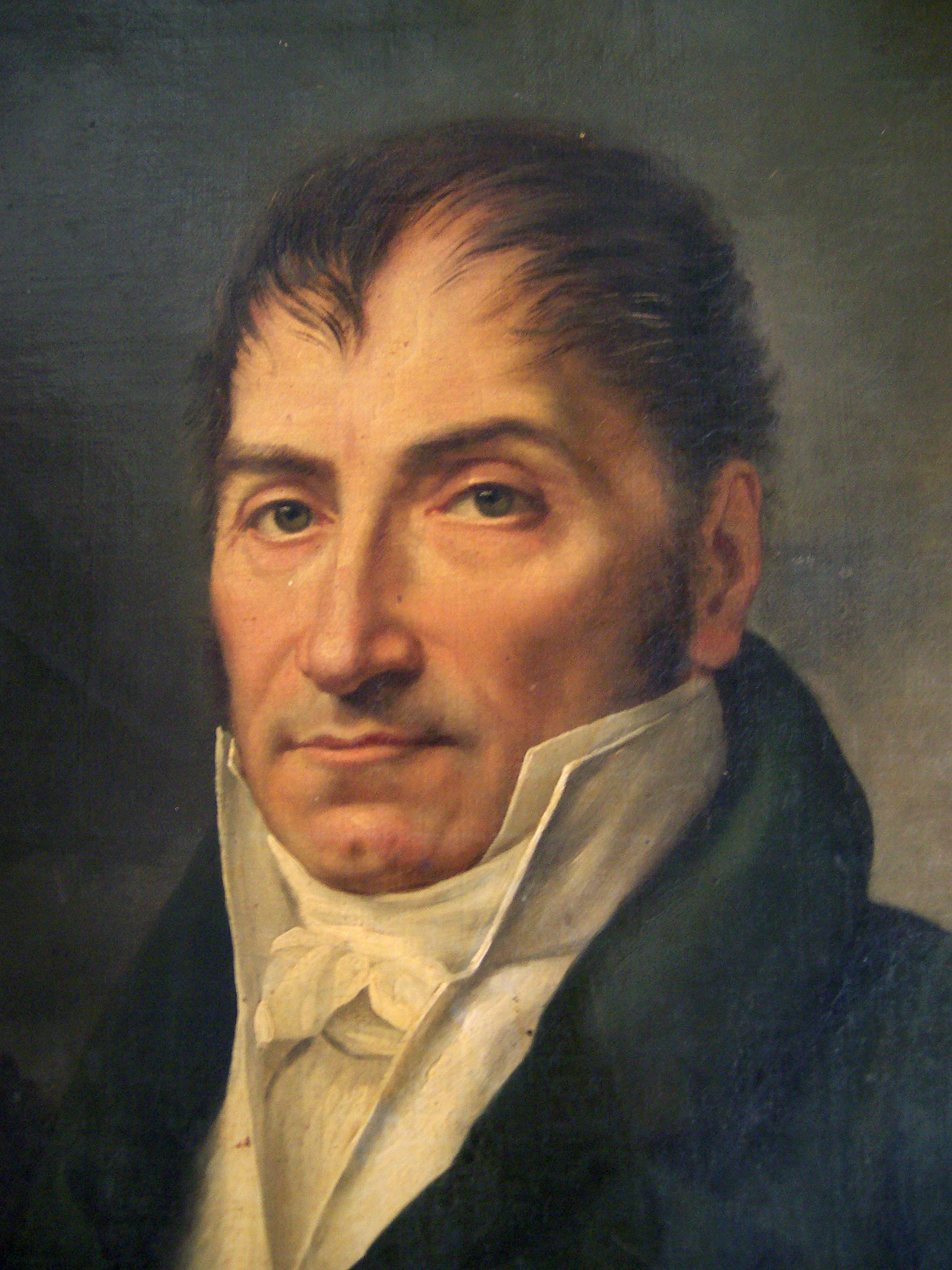
Jean-Baptiste Cavaignac

Jean-Baptiste Cavaignac (10 January 1763 – 24 March 1829) was a French politician and statesman.

== Biography ==
Born at Gourdon (Lot département), he was, after the outbreak of the French Revolution, a member of the département's directory and then elected its deputy to the National Convention, where he associated himself with the party of the Mountain and voted in favor of the death penalty for King Louis XVI.

He was constantly employed on missions in the provinces and distinguished himself by his staunch repression of the anti-Revolution risings in the newly designed départements of Landes, Basses-Pyrénées, and Gers. He represented the Convention in the Revolutionary Armies of Brest and of the Eastern Pyrenees in 1793, and in 1795 he was sent to the armies of the Moselle and the Rhine. With his colleague Jacques Pinet (1754–1844), he established at Bayonne a revolutionary tribunal, with authority in the neighboring towns. He went on to unleash a terror campaign aimed at imposing the French revolutionary discipline in the region.

Cavaignac managed to escape prosecution during the Thermidorian Reaction, assisted Paul Barras in resisting to the 13 Vendémiaire insurgency, and was a member of the Council of Five Hundred for a short while during the French Directory. Cavaignac filled various minor administrative offices under the Consulate and French Empire and in 1806 became an official in Joachim Murat's administration of the Kingdom of Naples. During the Hundred Days, he was préfet of the Somme. At the Bourbon Restoration, he was proscribed as a "regicide" and spent the last years of his life in Brussels, where he died.

== Appointment to Bayonne ==
On appointment as chief executive representative of the Convention in the French army stationed in the Basses-Pyrénées along with Pinet and Monestier (as civil representatives), the inhabitants of the recently suppressed Basque province of Labourd were shocked by a number of excesses and abuses. The Convention official is reported to relish riding in a lavish carriage pulled by four white horses across Labourd. Each time he approached a community or town, e.g. Saint-Jean-de-Luz, its inhabitants were constrained to step over and cheer waving a laurel bouquet to the cry "Long live Cavaignac, his colleagues, the Mountain and the Convention." His appointment was also followed by unrestrained revolutionary takeover and over-zeal, including a prohibition to use Basque in all public transactions and schools (proclaiming that "fanaticism speaks Basque"), as well as the indiscriminate deportation of thousands of residents to the Landes of Gascony.

Estimations on the number of deportees range from 4,000 to 8,000, representing between a quarter and half of the inhabitants of 17 villages of southern Labourd, of which 1,600 never returned alive. A local society denounced Cavaignac for cruelty before a tribunal of the reshuffled Convention in 1795, who went on to acknowledge the consideration of victims to the civilians, but neither Cavaignac nor any other high-ranking official was held accountable.

During August 1794 in the context of the War of the Pyrenees, as the highest authority of the Convention in Bayonne, he was in charge of negotiations with the representatives of the bordering Basque Spanish district of Gipuzkoa seeking detachment from Spain and conditional allegiance to France. Cavaignac's and Pinet's confrontational and clean-sweep approach towards a possible Gipuzkoan protectorate by France broke any possibilities of an understanding with the regional authorities. Cavaignac went on to order their arrest and imprisonment in Bayonne, with the Gipuzkoans opting to turn their loyalty to the Spanish heir apparent Ferdinand VII and raise a militia against the French.

== See also ==
- Dominique Joseph Garat
- End of Basque home rule in France

== Family ==
- His eldest son was Éléonore-Louis Godefroi Cavaignac (1801–1845)
- His second son was General Eugène Cavaignac (1802–1857)
- He was the brother of Jacques-Marie, vicomte Cavaignac (1773–1855)
