= Guillaume Méchin =

French bishop

Bishop Guillaume Méchin
- Title: Bishop
- Died: 15 March 1328 Avignon

Religious life
- Religion: Christianity
- Church: Catholic
- Profession: bishop of Pampelune, bishop of Troyes et bishop of Dol

Guillaume Méchin sometimes named Meschin (died in 1328 in Avignon) is a French prelate of XIV Century, who was successively bishop of Pamplona, bishop of Troyes and bishop of Dol.

== Biography ==
He was first of all notary of the Pope and adviser to the King. Initially vicar general of the bishop of Lectoure Pierre de Ferrières who resides in the kingdom of Naples, he is noticed by the pope John XXII who made him nuncio and sent him to the kingdom of Sicily to try to find peace between the kings Robert of Anjou and Frederick II of Sicily who were fighting over the kingdom. He then accompanied the legate Gosselin to help Philippe V to find peace with the Flemings. Member of the Royal Council, he was appointed Bishop of Pamplona in 1315. Transferred to the episcopal see of Troyes under the name of William Ier, he remains a diplomat of the Sovereign Pontiff and most often resides in Avignon. He was nevertheless transferred to the headquarters of Dol in Brittany in 1324 and died in Avignon in 1328.

== Source ==
- Notice on the archbishops of Sens and the bishops of Auxerre, Sens, 1855.
- Jean Charles Courtalon-Delaistre, “Historical topography of the city and the diocese of Troyes”, vol. 1, Veuve Gobelet à Troyes & Antoine Fournier in Paris, 1793, p369.
