= Éléonore-Louis Godefroi Cavaignac =

French politician (1801–1845)

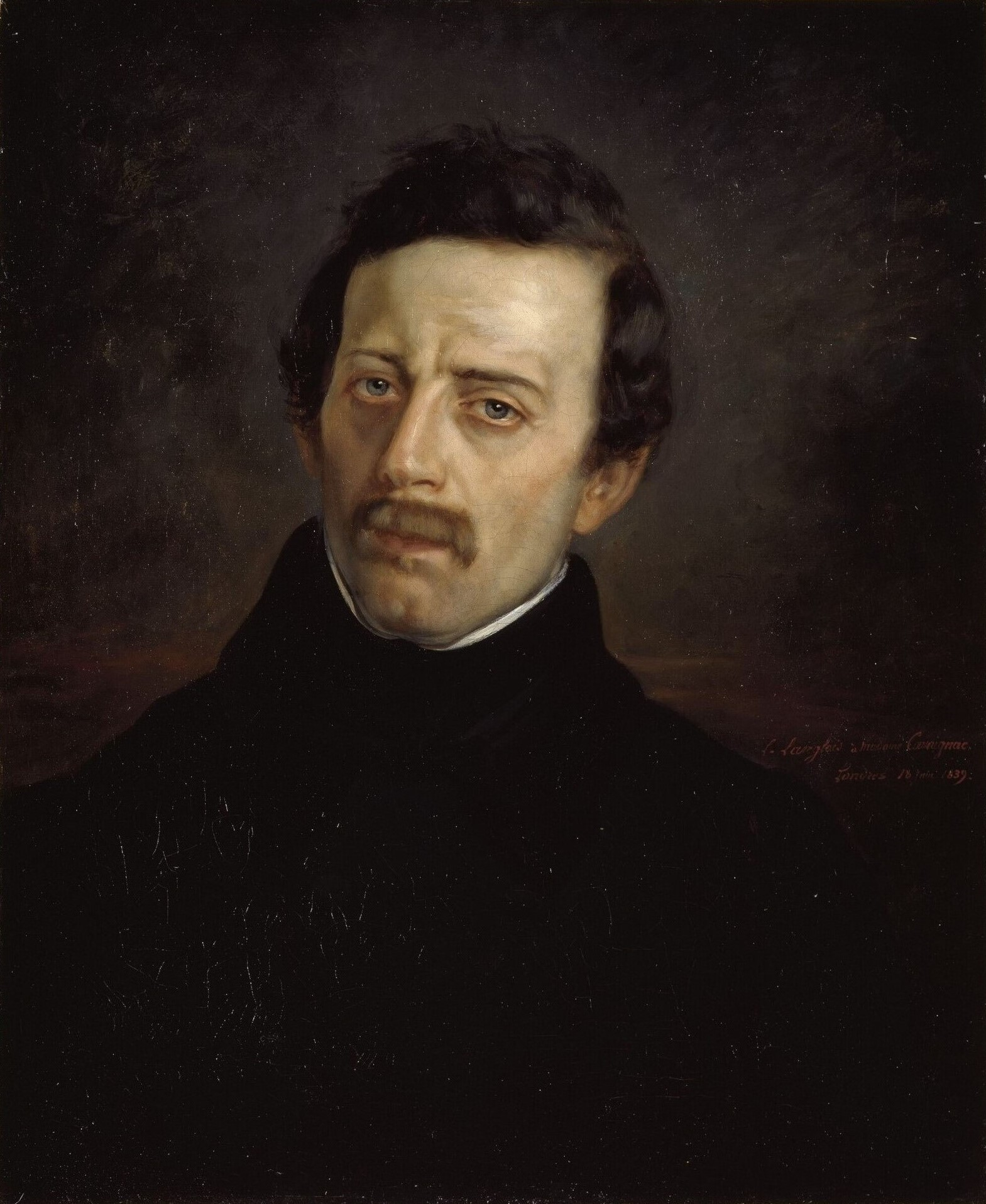
Portrait of Cavaignac during his exile in London, by Claude Louis Langlois (1839)

Éléonore-Louis Godefroi Cavaignac (30 May 1801 – 5 May 1845), better known as Godefroi Cavaignac, was a French politician and journalist.

He was born in Paris, the eldest son of Jean-Baptiste Cavaignac and the brother of Louis-Eugène Cavaignac, future head of state of France under the Second Republic; he was the uncle of Jacques Marie Eugène Godefroy Cavaignac.

Like his father, a Republican of the intransigent type, he was bitterly disappointed by the triumph of the monarchical principle after the Revolution of July 1830, in which he had taken part. He also participated in the Parisian uprisings of October 1830 during the trial of Charles X's ministers, 1832 and 1834. On the third occasion, he was imprisoned, but escaped to England in 1835.

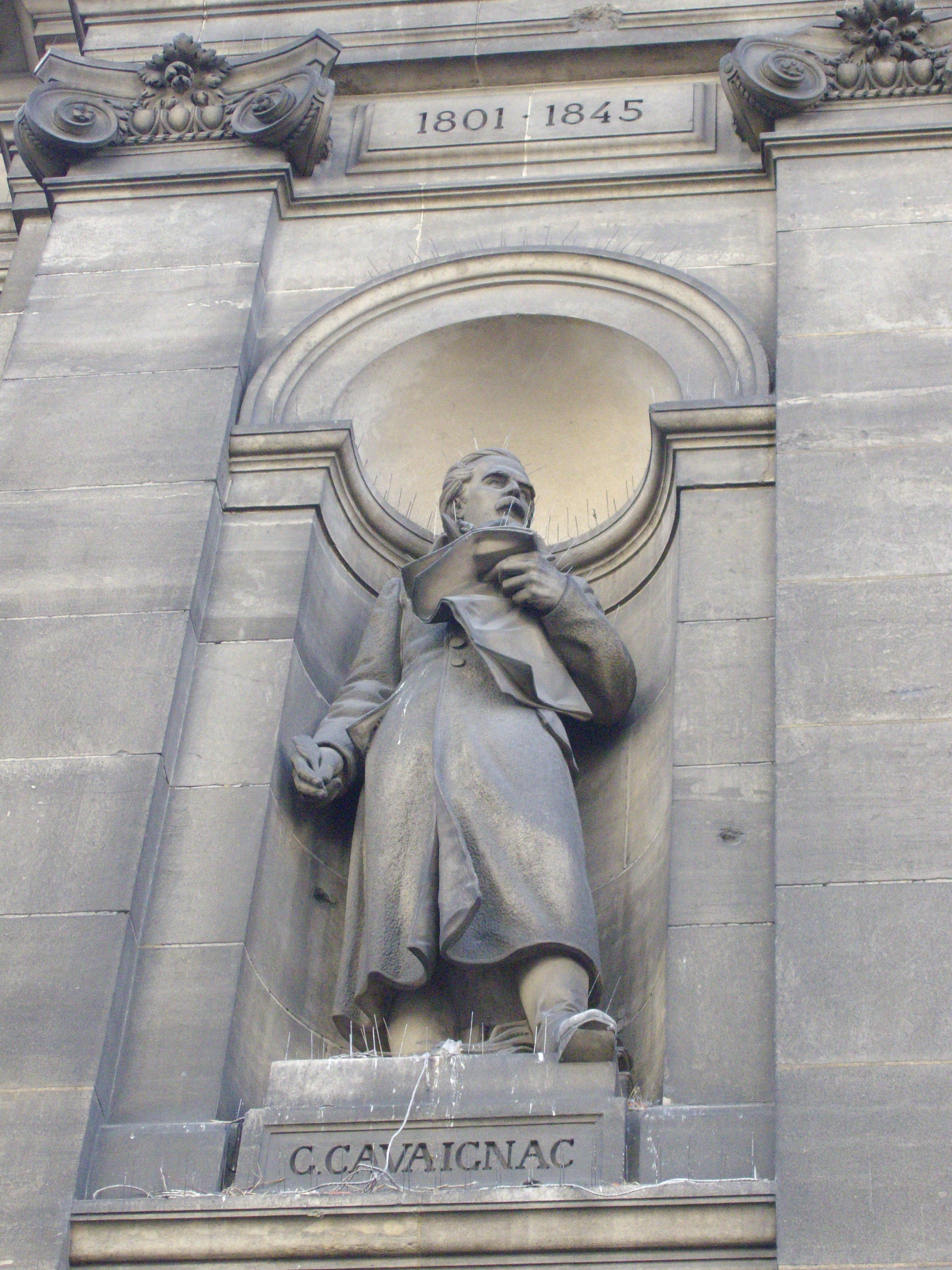
Cavaignac statue at the Hôtel de Ville, Paris

When he returned to France in 1841, he worked on the staff of La Réforme, and produced energetic republican propaganda. In 1843, he became president of the Society of the Rights of Man, of which he had been one of the founders in 1832.

The recumbent statue (1847) of Godefroi Cavaignac on his tomb at Montmartre, Paris, is one of the masterpieces of the sculptor François Rude and Rude's pupil Ernest Christophe.

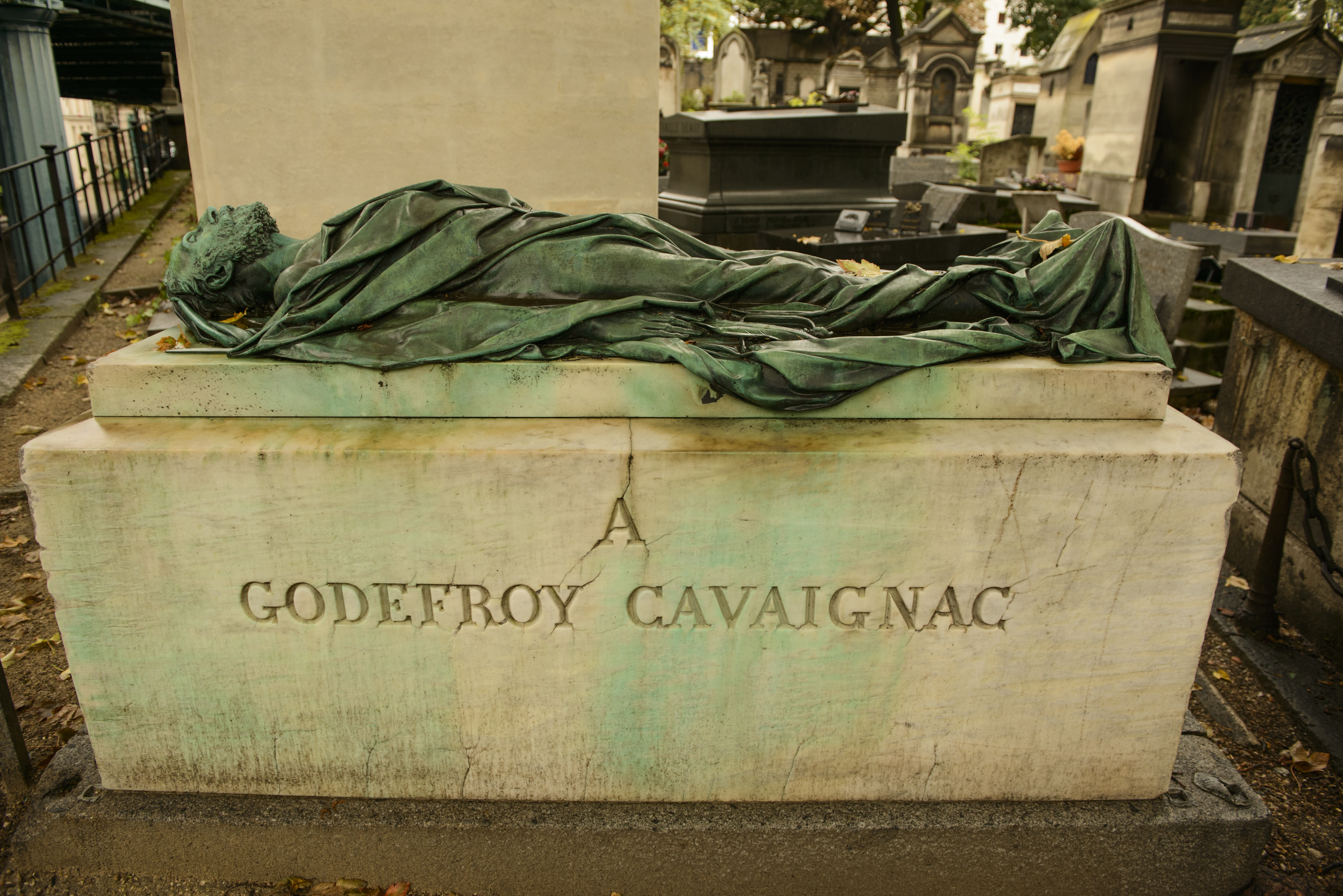
Caravaignac's tomb at Montmatre
