= Alexandre Méchin =

French politician

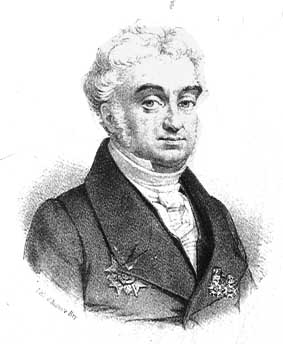
- Born: 18 March 1772
- Died: 20 September 1849 (aged 77)
- Occupations: Politician, Deputy, Councillor of state, Prefect

Alexandre Edme, baron Méchin (born in Paris on 18 March 1772; died in Paris on 20 September 1849) was a senior French official and politician.

== Biography ==
Son of a clerk at the Ministry of War, Alexandre Méchin was a partisan of the French Revolution, enlisting among the Jacobins in 1790 before approaching the Girondins, which earned him the ban on 31 May 1793. He returned to France after 9 Thermidor and followed Louis-Marie Stanislas Fréron in his mission in the South in year III (October 1795). Upon his return to Paris, he was appointed chief of staff of interior minister, Pierre Bénézech.

In July 1798, he was sent to Malta to replace Michel Regnaud de Saint-Jean d'Angély as commissioner of the Executive Directory. But, as he joined this post, together with his wife Mme Raoulx, who had the reputation of being one of the most beautiful people of his time, he was arrested in Viterbo during 'riot. He left a Precise of my trip and my mission to Italy in the years 1798 and 1799 and account of the events which took place in Viterbo from 27 November 1798 until 28 December next (1808). In 2009, a handwritten copy of these memoirs was found in Viterbo, with the collector of Maria Teresa Anselmi. The manuscript, written in Italian by Méchin himself, has been republished. He also made a translation of Juvenal's Satires into French verse (1817).

Returning to France, he was successively prefect of Landes (year VIII), of Roër (year X), of Aisne (year XIII), of Calvados (1810). On 31 December 1809 he was created Empire baron. He was revoked during the first Restoration in 1814, and, according to Laurent Esnault (Mémoires sur Caen, year 1814), "was not regretted; since the grain insurrection he was generally hated".

He was appointed prefect of Ille-et-Vilaine during Hundred Days on 6 April 1815 before being again revoked after Waterloo.

In 1816, he opened a banking house, then was elected liberal deputy by the great college of Aisne in 1819. He was reelected on 25 February 1824 in the 4th arrondissement electoral district of Aisne (Soissons) and on 17 November 1827.

Brilliant orator, he was one of the most virulent opponents to the governments of the Restoration, and particularly to the ministry Villèle, voting against the emergency laws, against the new electoral law, against the conversion of annuities. He befriended the General Sébastiani, like him a former dignitary of the Empire and elected of this department, and familiar with the Palais-Royal. Méchin was undoubtedly one of the first to imagine placing the Duke of Orleans on the throne of a constitutional monarchy refounded. From 1823, whereas the expedition of Spain risks, according to him, to bring about the fall of the Bourbons of the elder branch, he evoked with Stanislas de Girardin the idea to entrust to the Duke of Orleans the general lieutenant of the kingdom, "by virtue of a wish made by part of the chambers and a certain order of soldiers, officials and citizens". This was, more or less, the scheme that would be implemented in 1830.

After having voted the address of 221 against the ministry Polignac, Méchin rushed to the Palais-Royal to announce his adoption. He was re-elected on 23 June 1830. Participating in the July Revolution, he was one of those who supported François Guizot's proposal to create a provisional municipal commission to administer the capital on 29 July 1830. On 30 July he was one of those who went to castle of Neuilly to urge the Duke of Orleans to accept the lieutenant general of the kingdom, to which the deputies.

He was then appointed prefect of the North and submitted, for this reason, to re-election on 20 December 1830, he saw his mandate confirmed. He did not stand for re-election in 1831 and was appointed Councilor of State. He was retired on 12 May 1840.

He gave a verse translation of "Satires" by Juvenal (1827).
