= List of liberal theorists =

Individual contributors to classical liberalism and political liberalism are associated with philosophers of the Enlightenment. Liberalism as a specifically named ideology begins in the late 18th century as a movement towards self-government and away from aristocracy. It included the ideas of self-determination, the primacy of the individual and the nation as opposed to the state and religion as being the fundamental units of law, politics and economy.

Since then liberalism broadened to include a wide range of approaches from Americans Ronald Dworkin, Richard Rorty, John Rawls and Francis Fukuyama as well as the Indian Amartya Sen and the Peruvian Hernando de Soto. Some of these people moved away from liberalism while others espoused other ideologies before turning to liberalism. There are many different views of what constitutes liberalism, and some liberals would feel that some of the people on this list were not true liberals. It is intended to be suggestive rather than exhaustive. Theorists whose ideas were mainly typical for one country should be listed in that country's section of liberalism worldwide. Generally only thinkers are listed whereas politicians are only listed when they also made substantial contributions to liberal theory beside their active political work.

== Classical contributors to liberalism ==
=== Aristotle ===
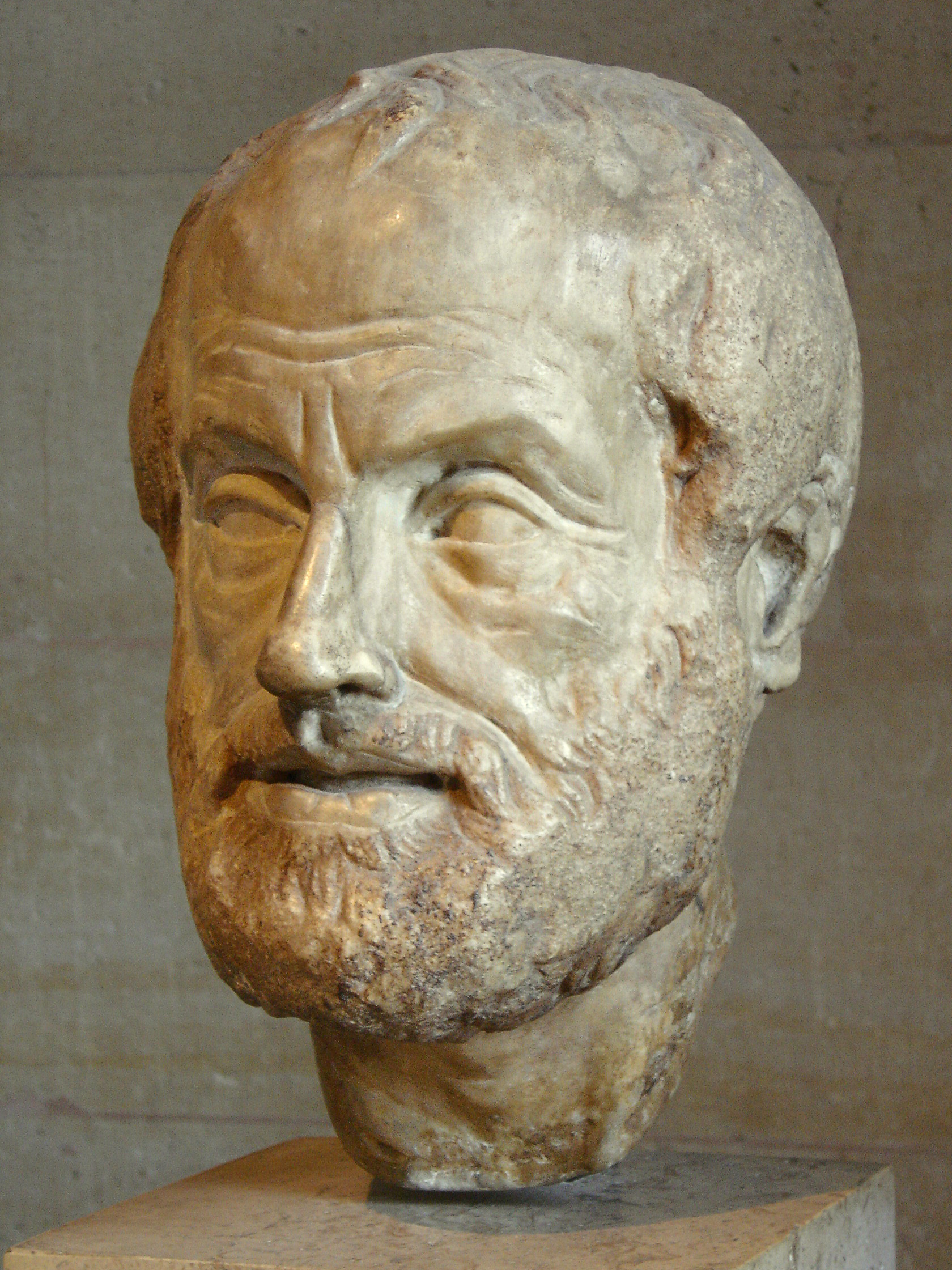
Aristotle

Aristotle (Athens, 384–322 BC) is revered among political theorists for his seminal work Politics. He made invaluable contributions to liberal theory through his observations on different forms of government and the nature of man.

He begins with the idea that the best government provides an active and "happy" life for its people. Aristotle then considers six forms of government: Monarchy, Aristocracy, and Polity on one side as 'good' forms of government, and Tyranny, Oligarchy, and Democracy as 'bad' forms. Considering each in turn, Aristotle rejects Monarchy as infantilizing of citizens, Oligarchy as too profit-motivated, Tyranny as against the will of the people, Democracy as serving only to the poor, and Aristocracy (known today as Meritocracy) as ideal but ultimately impossible. Aristotle finally concludes that a polity—a combination between democracy and oligarchy, where most can vote but must choose among the rich and virtuous for governors—is the best compromise between idealism and realism.

In addition, Aristotle was a firm supporter of private property. He refuted Plato's argument for a collectivist society in which family and property are held in common: Aristotle makes the argument that when one's own son or land is rightfully one's own, one puts much more effort into cultivating that item, to the ultimate betterment of society. He references barbarian tribes of his time in which property was held in common, and the laziest of the bunch would always take away large amounts of food grown by the most diligent.

=== Cicero ===
Marcus Tullius Cicero (3 January 106 BC – 7 December 43 BC)

His Stoic, Cato, advocated for Greek Stoicism in Cicero's books. It's a development of Aristotle's ethics and goes further, advocating equal rights for all people. It was found to be scientifically true on inspection in the '90s, by Becker (1998). He was also a major influence to John Locke.

=== Laozi ===
Laozi was a Chinese philosopher and writer, considered the founder of Taoism. Arguing that Laozi is a libertarian, James A. Dorn wrote that Laozi, like many 18th-century liberals, "argued that minimizing the role of government and letting individuals develop spontaneously would best achieve social and economic harmony."

== Liberal thinkers of the Muslim Golden Age ==
The Islamic Golden Age (8th to 14th century) was marked by a flourishing of intellectual activity in the Islamic world. Several scholars and thinkers from this era contributed to ideas that align with certain liberal principles, emphasizing reason, justice, and individual rights.

=== Al-Farabi (872–950) ===
Al-Farabi, known as "the Second Teacher," was a philosopher influential in transmitting Greek philosophy to the Islamic world. His political philosophy, seen in works like The Virtuous City, stressed the importance of justice and the common good in governance, influencing both Muslim and European thought.

=== Averroes (1126–1198) ===
Ibn Rushd, a Spanish-Arab philosopher, advocated for the compatibility of reason and philosophy with Islamic faith. His commentaries on Aristotle and independent works promoted the separation of reason and revelation, profoundly influencing both Islamic and Western thought.

=== Avicenna (980–1037) ===
Ibn Sina, a polymath known for contributions to medicine and metaphysics, delved into political philosophy. In *The Book of Healing*, he discussed the need for a well-ordered state, emphasizing the role of a philosopher-king guided by reason and wisdom.

=== Ibn Tufayl (1105–1185) ===
Ibn Tufail, a philosopher and physician, explored individualism and reason in Hayy ibn Yaqdhan. The novel discussed a person raised in isolation, emphasizing themes of individual pursuit of knowledge.

== From Machiavelli to Spinoza ==
=== Niccolò Machiavelli ===
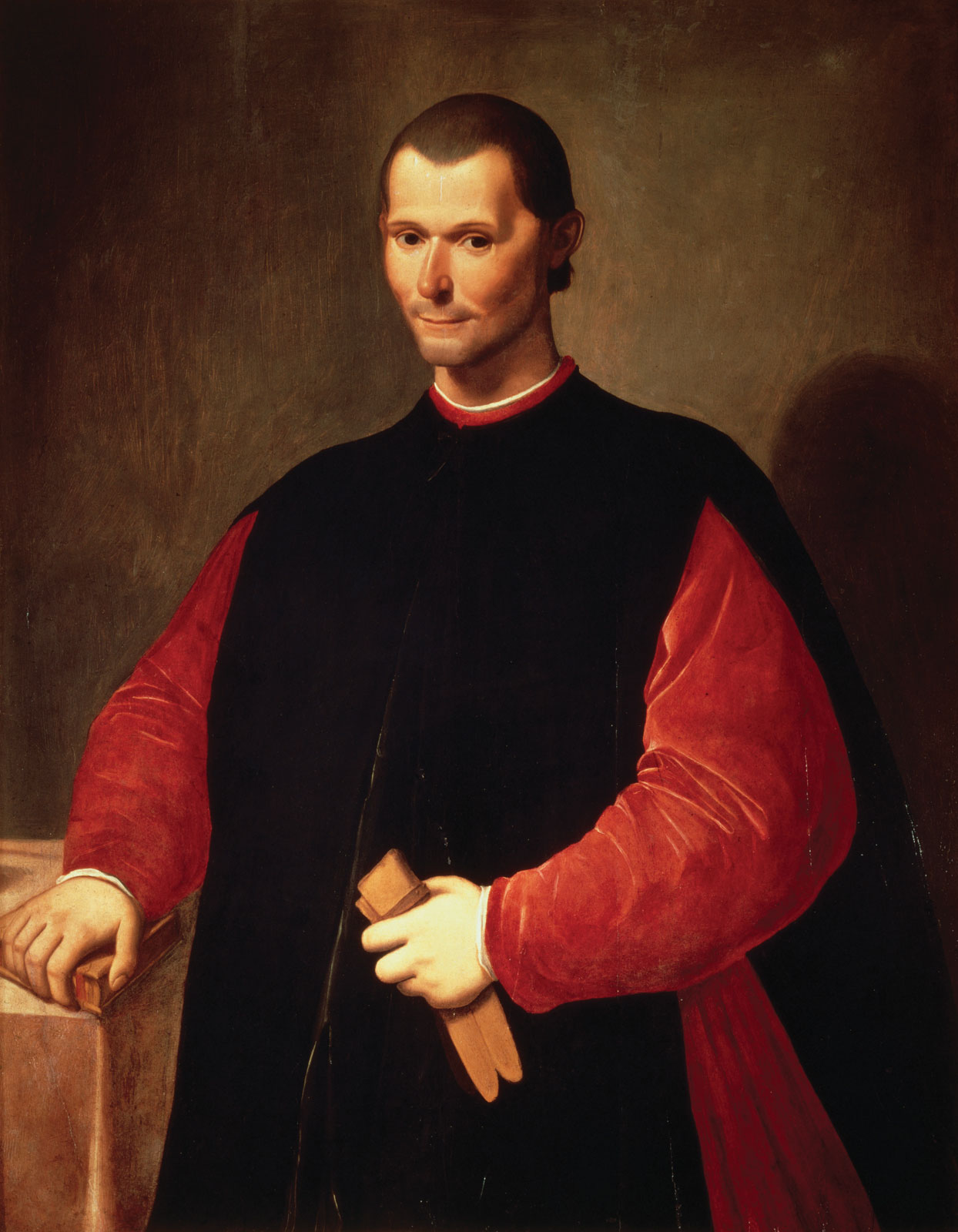
Niccolò Machiavelli

Niccolò Machiavelli (Florence, 1469–1527), best known for his Il Principe was the founder of realist political philosophy, advocated republican government, citizen armies, protection of personal property, and restraint of government expenditure as being necessary to the liberties of a republic. He wrote extensively on the need for individual initiative—virtu—as an essential characteristic of stable government. He argued that liberty was the central good which government should protect, and that "good people" would make good laws, whereas people who had lost their virtue could maintain their liberties only with difficulty. His Discourses on Livy outlined realism as the central idea of political study and favored "Republics" over "Principalities".

Machiavelli differed from true liberal thinking however, in that he still noted the benefits of princely governance. He states that republican leaders need to "act alone" if they want to reform a republic, and offers the example of Romulus, who killed his brother and co-ruler to found a great city. Republics need to refer to arbitrary and violent measures if it is necessary to maintain the structure of the government, as Machiavelli says that they have to ignore thoughts of justice and fairness.

Anti-statist liberals consider Machiavelli's distrust as his main message, noting his call for a strong state under a strong leader, who should use any means to establish his position, whereas liberalism is an ideology of individual freedom and voluntary choices.

- Contributing literature:
  - Discorsi sopra la prima deca di Tito Livio, 1512–1517 (Discourse on the First Decade of Titus Livius)

=== Erasmus ===
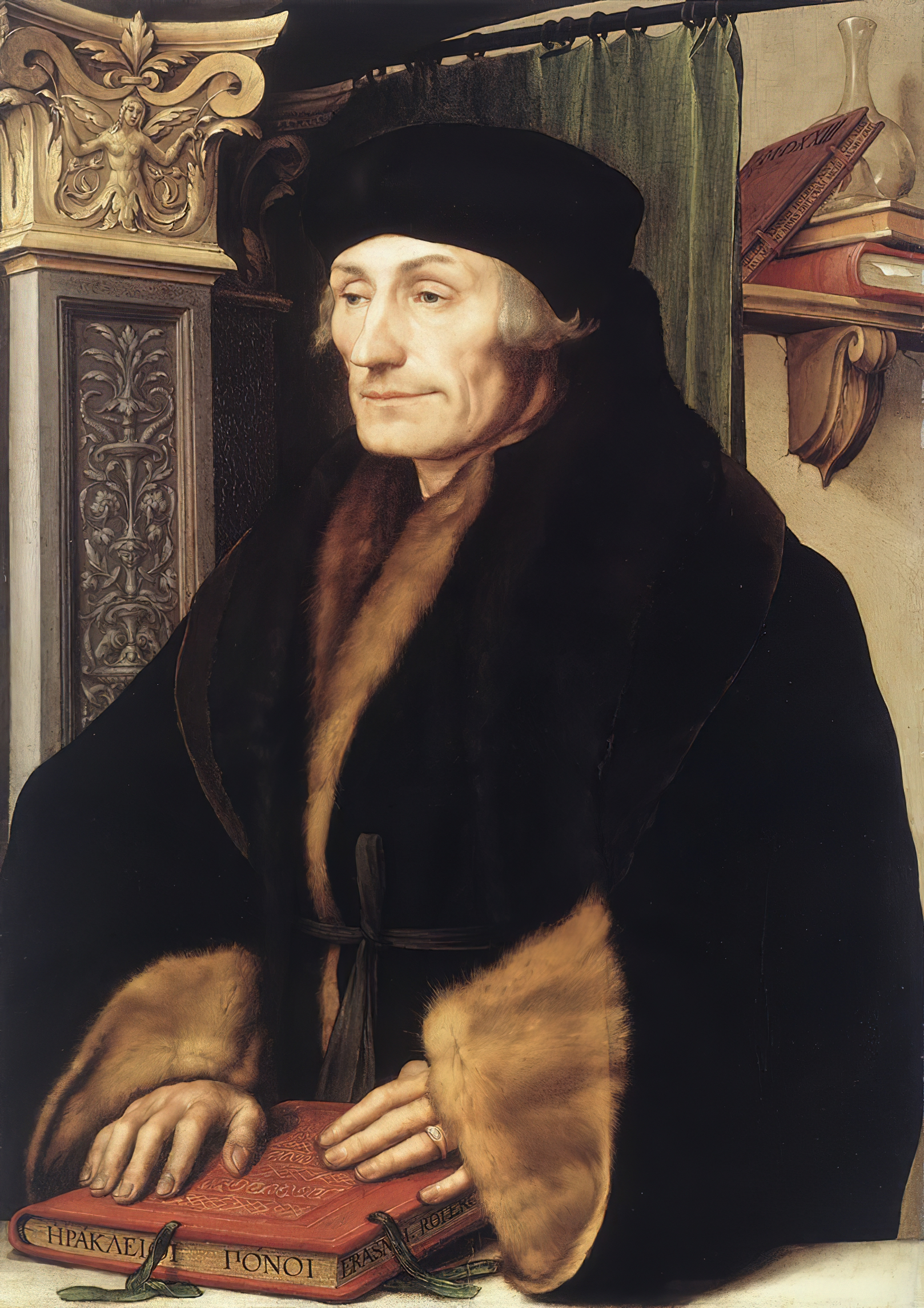
Desiderius Erasmus

Desiderius Erasmus (Netherlands, 1466–1536) was an advocate of humanism, critic of entrenched interests, irrationality and superstition. Erasmusian societies formed across Europe, to some extent in response to the turbulence of the Reformation. In his De libero arbitrio diatribe sive collatio (1524), he analyzes the Lutheran exaggeration of the obvious limitations on human freedom.

- Contributing literature
  - Stultitiae Laus, 1509 (The Praise of Folly)
  - De libero arbitrio diatribe sive collatio, 1524

=== Étienne de La Boétie ===
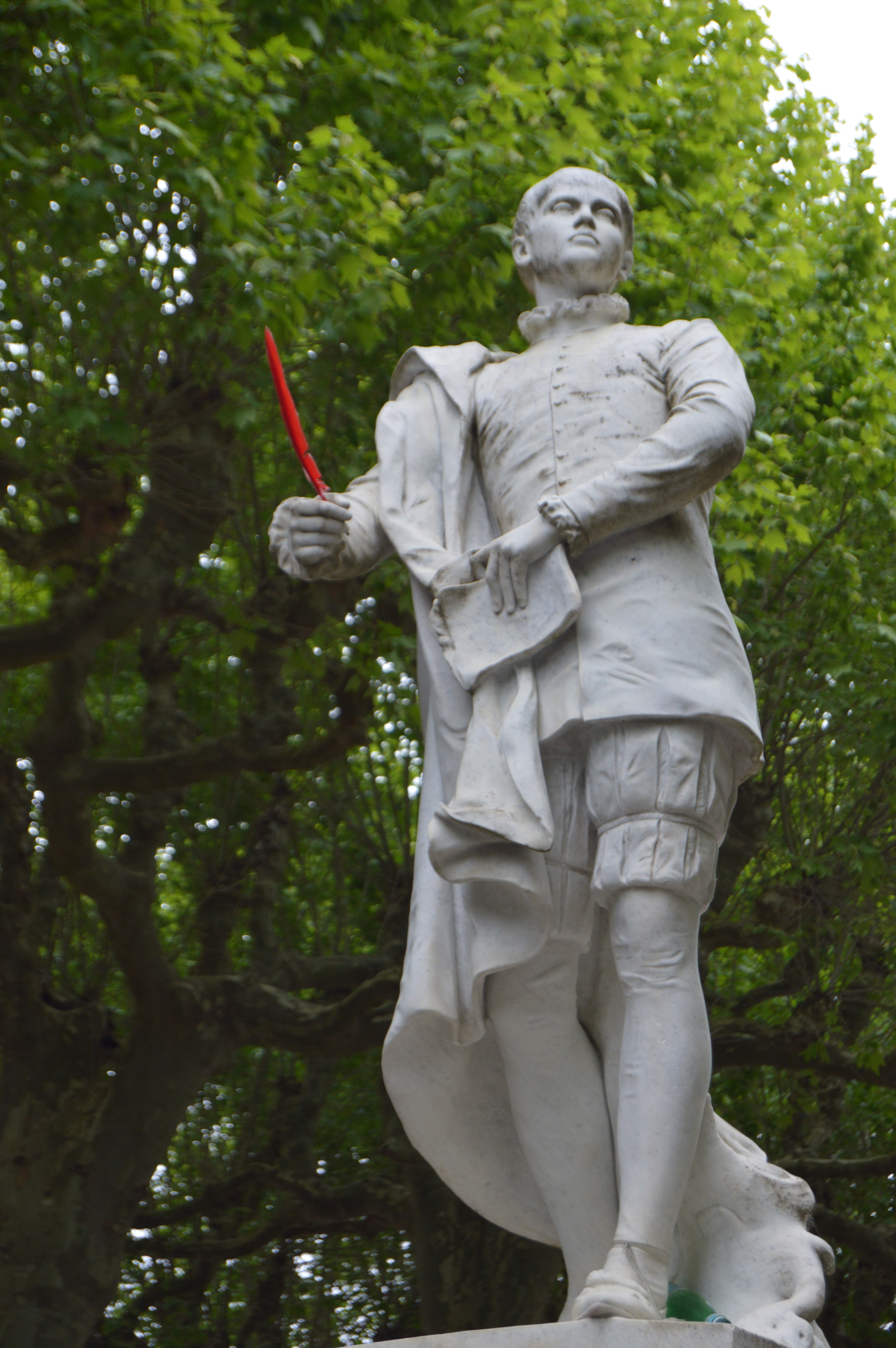
Étienne de La Boétie

Étienne de La Boétie (France, 1530–1563) was a French writer, magistrate and political theorist. According to Etienne the chief question of political philosophy was the question of how people come to accept the will of tyrants.

- Contributing literature
  - Discourse on Voluntary Servitude, 1577

=== Hugo Grotius ===
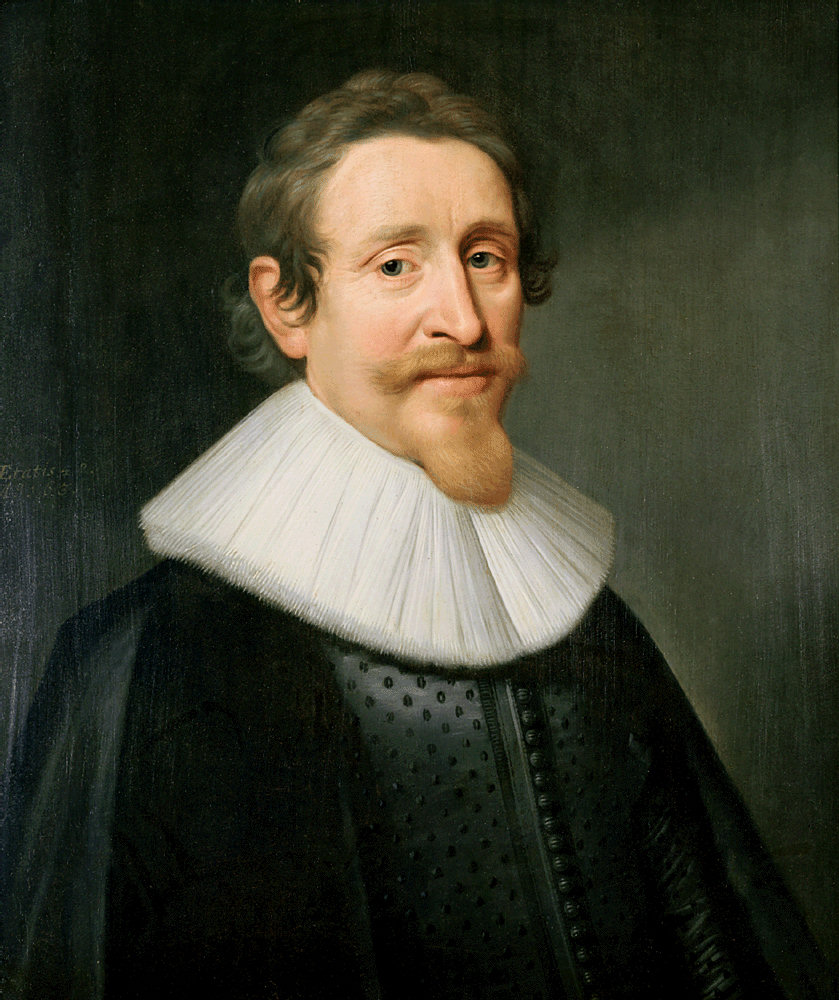
Hugo Grotius

Hugo Grotius (Netherlands 1583–1645)

- Contributing literature
  - Mare Liberum, 1606
  - De jure belli ac pacis, 1625

=== Thomas Hobbes ===
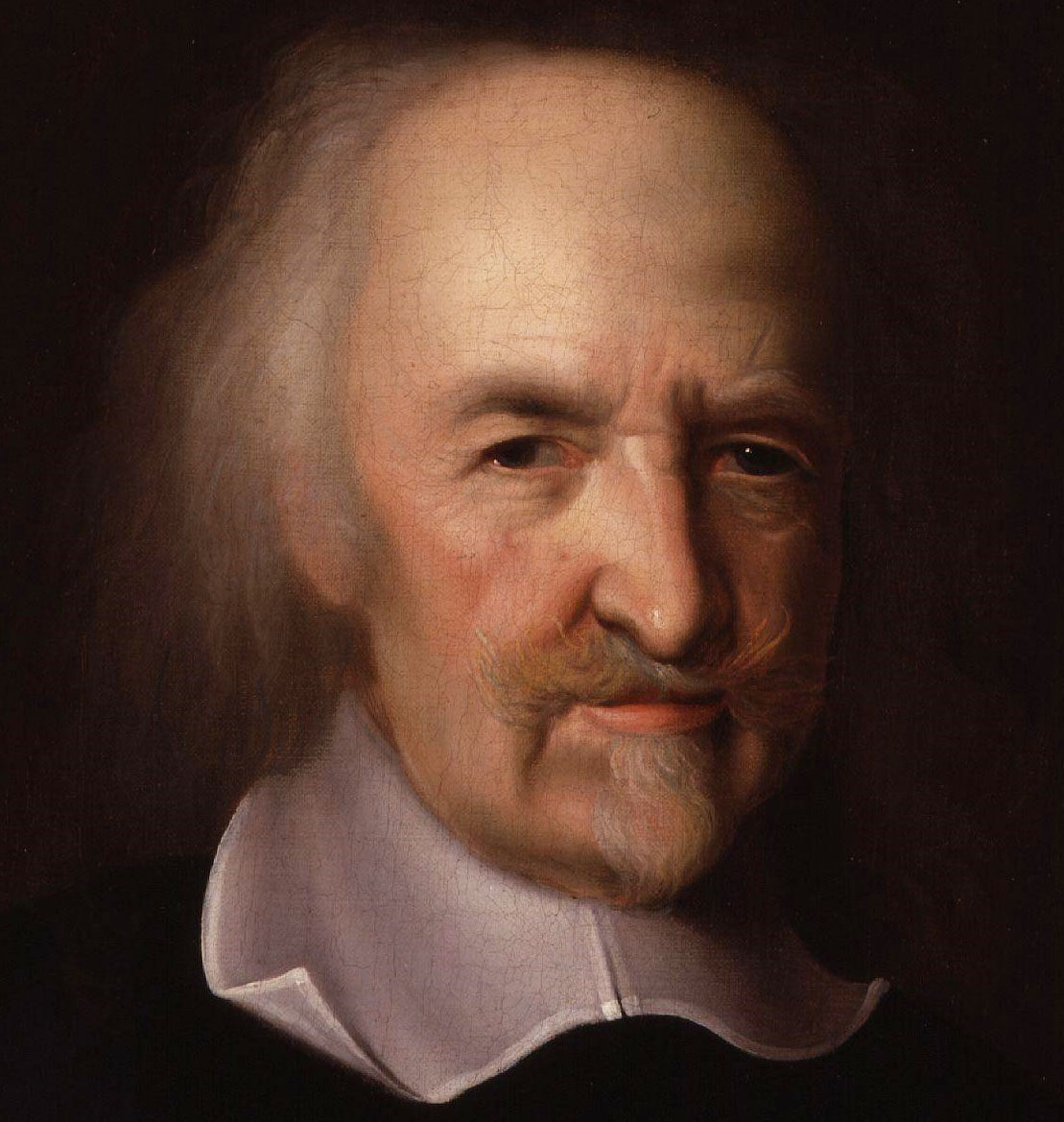
Thomas Hobbes

Thomas Hobbes (England, 1588–1679) theorized that government is the result of individual actions and human traits, and that it was motivated primarily by "interest", a term which would become crucial in the development of a liberal theory of government and political economy, since it is the foundation of the idea that individuals can be self-governing and self-regulating. His work Leviathan, did not advocate this viewpoint, but instead that only a strong government could restrain unchecked interest: it did, however, advance a proto-liberal position in arguing for an inalienable "right of nature," the right to defend oneself, even against the state. Though his own ideological position is open to debate, his work influenced Spinoza, Locke, Hamilton, Jefferson, Madison and many other liberals.

- Contributing literature:
  - Leviathan, 1651 (Theologico-Political Treatise)

=== Spinoza ===
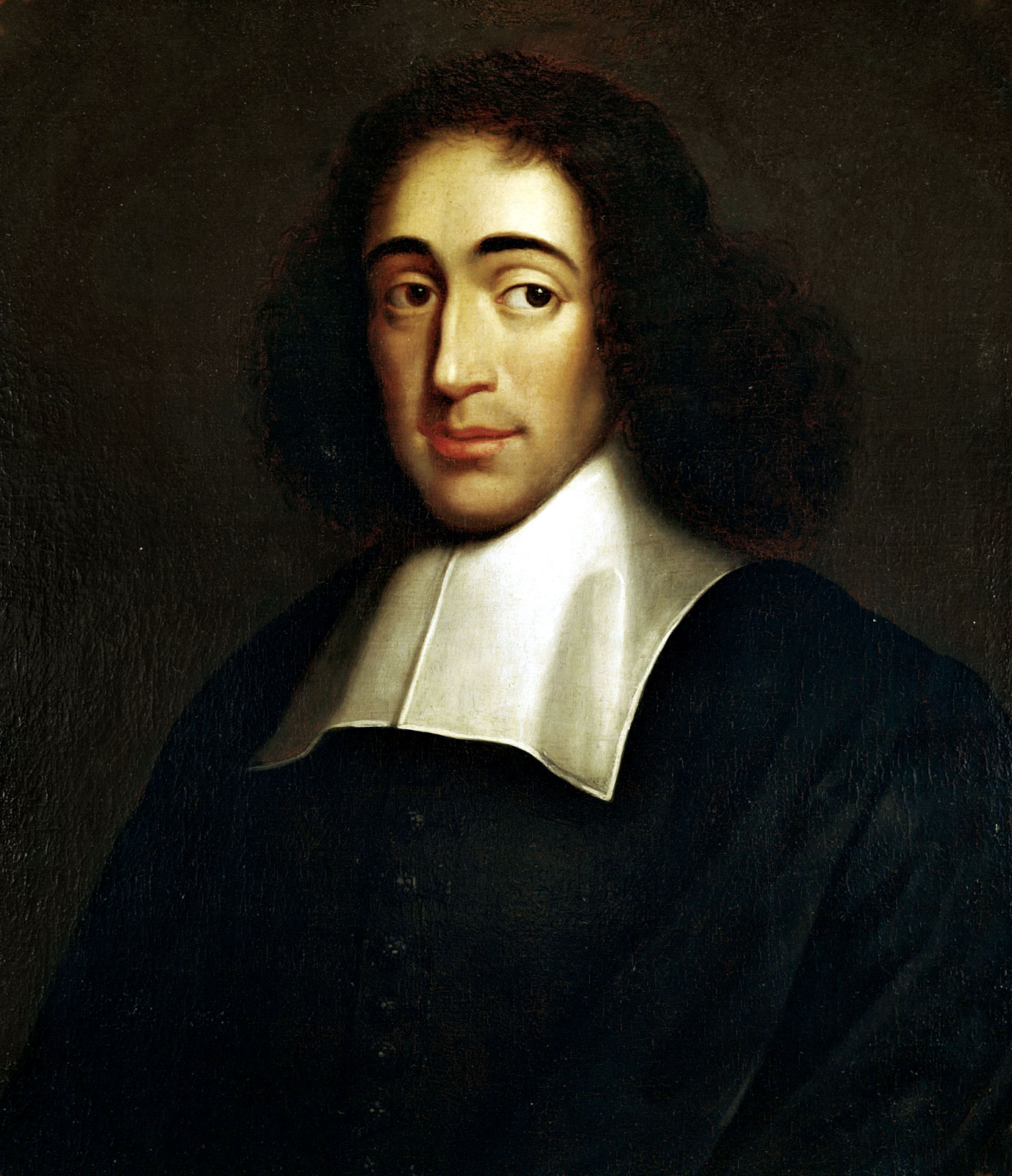
Portrait of Baruch Spinoza, 1665.

Baruch Spinoza (Netherlands, 1632–1677) in his Tractatus Theologico-Politicus (TTP) (1670) and Tractatus Politicus (1678) defends the importance of separation of church and state as well as forms of democracy. In the TTP, Spinoza articulates a strong critique of religious intolerance and a defense of secular government against the power of religious authorities. Spinoza laid the philosophical groundwork for the emancipation of Jews, putting them on an equal footing as other citizens.

- Contributing literature:
  - Tractatus Theologico-Politicus, 1670 (Theologico-Political Treatise)
  - Tractatus Politicus, 1677 (Political Treatise)

== From Locke to Tocqueville ==
=== John Locke ===
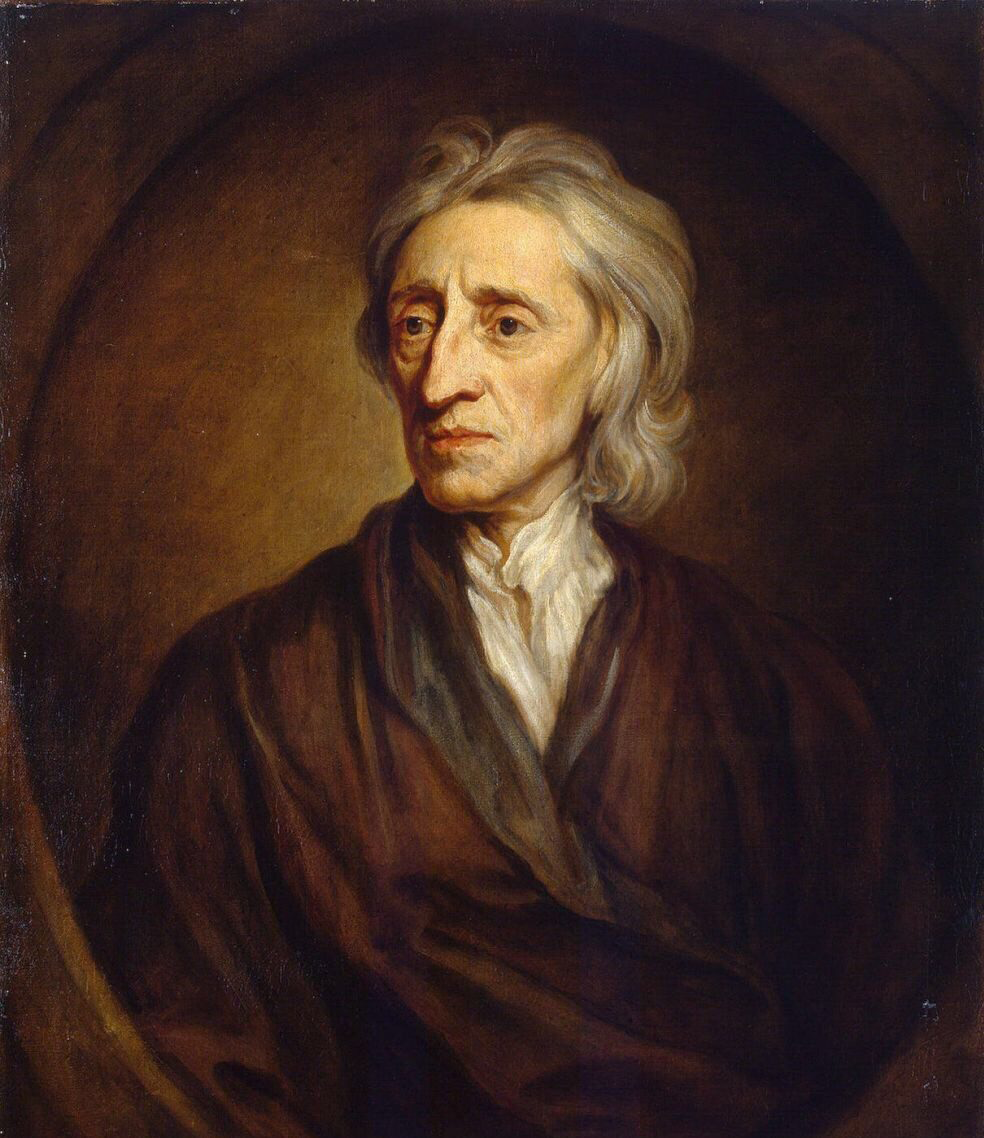
John Locke

John Locke's (England, 1632–1704) notion that a "government with the consent of the governed" and man's natural rights—life, liberty, and estate (property) as well on tolerance, as laid down in A letter concerning toleration and Two treatises of government—had an enormous influence on the development of liberalism. Locke developed a theory of property resting on the actions of individuals, rather than on descent or nobility.

- Some literature:
  - A Letter Concerning Toleration, 1689
  - The Second Treatise of Civil Government, 1689

=== John Trenchard ===
John Trenchard (United Kingdom, 1662–1723) was co-author, with Thomas Gordon of Cato's Letters. These newspaper essays condemned tyranny and advanced principles of freedom of conscience and freedom of speech and were a main vehicle for spreading the concepts that had been developed by John Locke.

- Some literature:
  - Cato's Letters / John Trenchard & Thomas Gordon, 1720–1723

=== Charles de Montesquieu ===
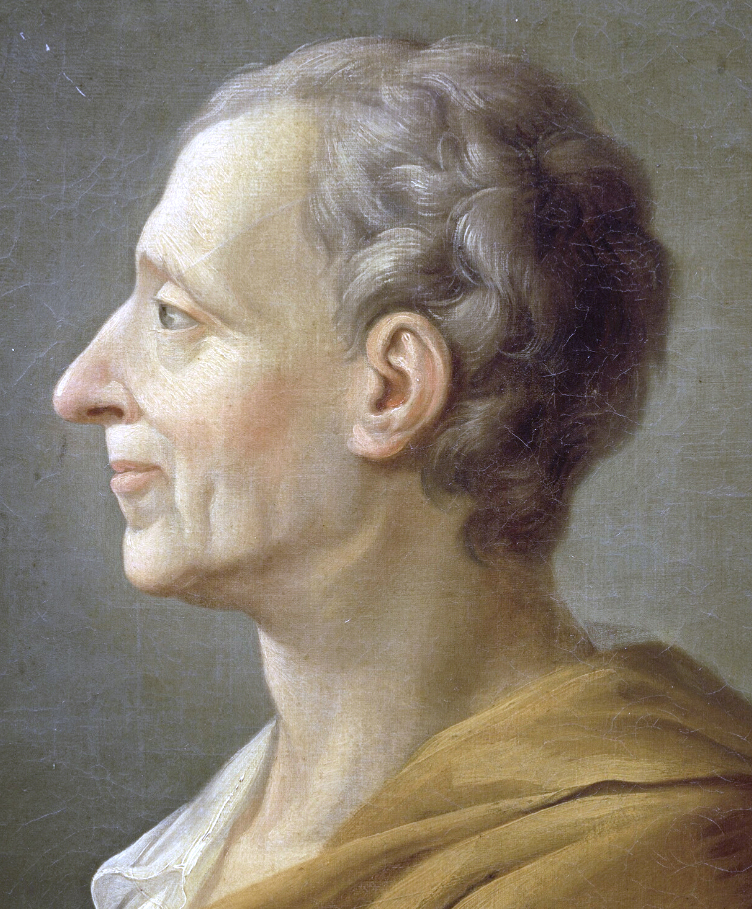
Montesquieu

Charles de Montesquieu (France, 1689–1755) In The Spirit of Law, Montesquieu expounded the separation of powers in government and society. In government, Montesquieu encouraged division into the now standard legislative, judicial and executive branches; in society, he perceived a natural organization into king, the people and the aristocracy, with the latter playing a mediating role. "I do not write to censor that which is established in any country whatsoever," Montesquieu disclaimed in the Laws; however, he did pay special attention to what he felt was the positive example of the constitutional system in England, which in spite of its evolution toward a fusion of powers, had moderated the power of the monarch, and divided Parliament along class lines.

Montesquieu's work had a seminal impact on the American and French revolutionaries. Ironically, the least liberal element of his thought—his privileging of the aristocracy—was belied by both revolutions. Montesquieu's system came to fruition in America, a country with no aristocracy; in France, political maneuvering by the aristocracy led to the convocation of the 1789 Estates-General and popular revolt.

- Some literature:
  - De l'esprit des lois, 1748 (The Spirit of Law
  - Encyclopédie, ou dictionnaire raisonné des sciences, des arts et des métiers (together with others), 1751–1772 (Encyclopaedia, or Reasoned Dictionary of the Sciences, Arts, and Trades)

=== Thomas Gordon ===
Thomas Gordon (United Kingdom, 169?–1750) was co-author, with John Trenchard of Cato's Letters. These newspaper essays condemned tyranny and advanced principles of freedom of conscience and freedom of speech and were a main vehicle for spreading the concepts that had been developed by John Locke.

- Some literature:
  - Cato's Letters / John Trenchard & Thomas Gordon, 1720–1723

=== François Quesnay ===
François Quesnay (France, 1694–1774)

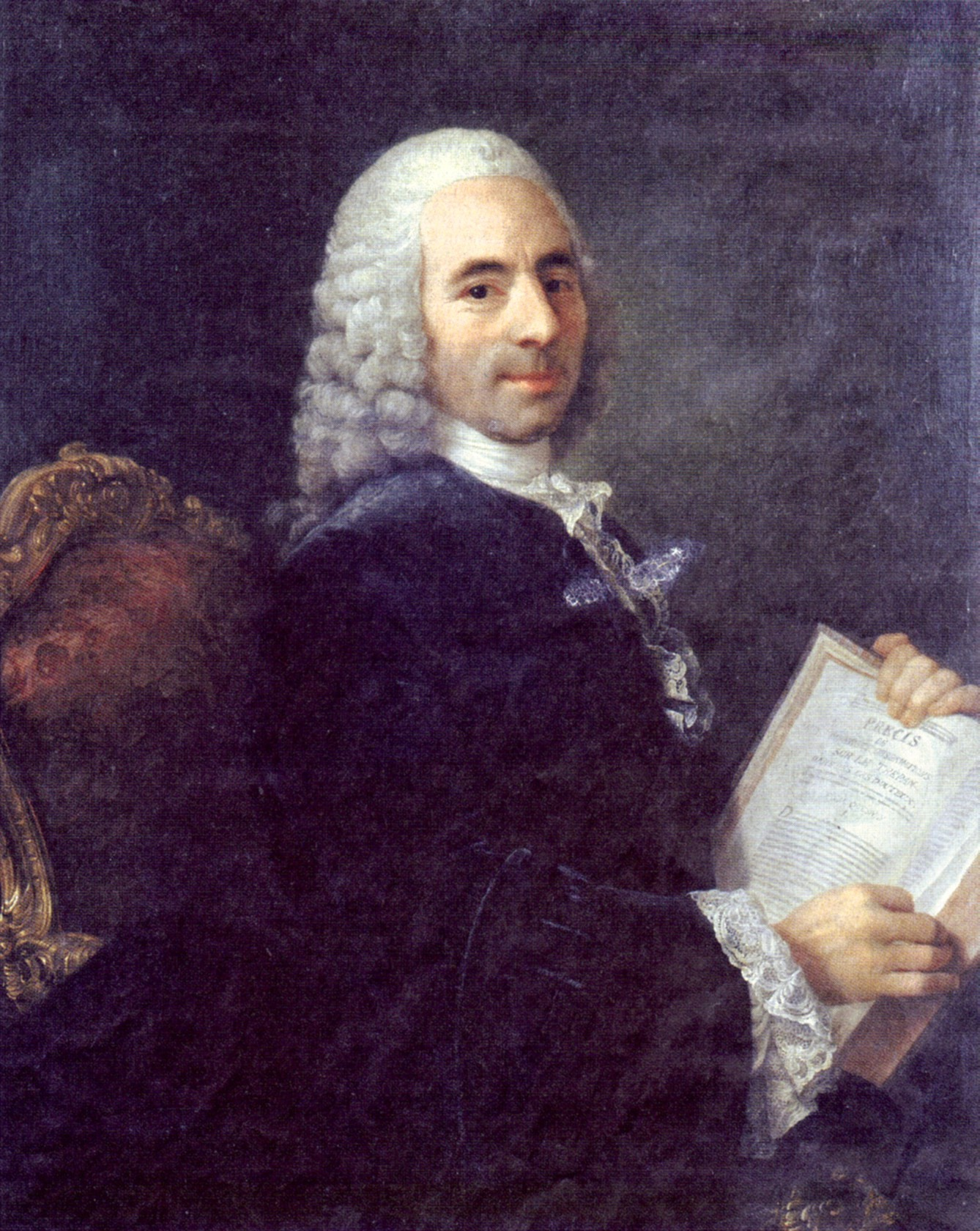
François Quenay

- Some literature:
  - Tableau économique, 1758
  - Encyclopédie, ou dictionnaire raisonné des sciences, des arts et des métiers (together with others), 1751–1772 (Encyclopaedia, or Reasoned Dictionary of the Sciences, Arts, and Trades)

=== Voltaire ===
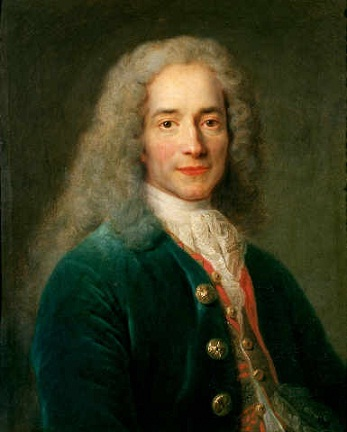
Voltaire

Voltaire (France, 1694–1778)

- Some literature:
  - Lettres Philosophiques sur les Anglais, 1734 (Philosophical Letters on the English)
  - Encyclopédie, ou dictionnaire raisonné des sciences, des arts et des métiers (together with others), 1751–1772 (Encyclopaedia, or Reasoned Dictionary of the Sciences, Arts, and Trades)
  - Essai sur l'histoire génerale et sur les moeurs et l'espirit des nations, 1756 (Essay on the Manner and Spirit of Nations and on the Principal Occurrences in History)
  - Traité sur la Tolérance à l'occasion de la mort de Jean Calas, 1763 (Treatise on Tolerance on the Occasion of the Death of Jean Calas)
  - Dictionnaire Philosophique, 1764 (Philosophical Dictionary)

=== Jean-Jacques Rousseau ===
Jean-Jacques Rousseau (Switzerland, 1712–1778)

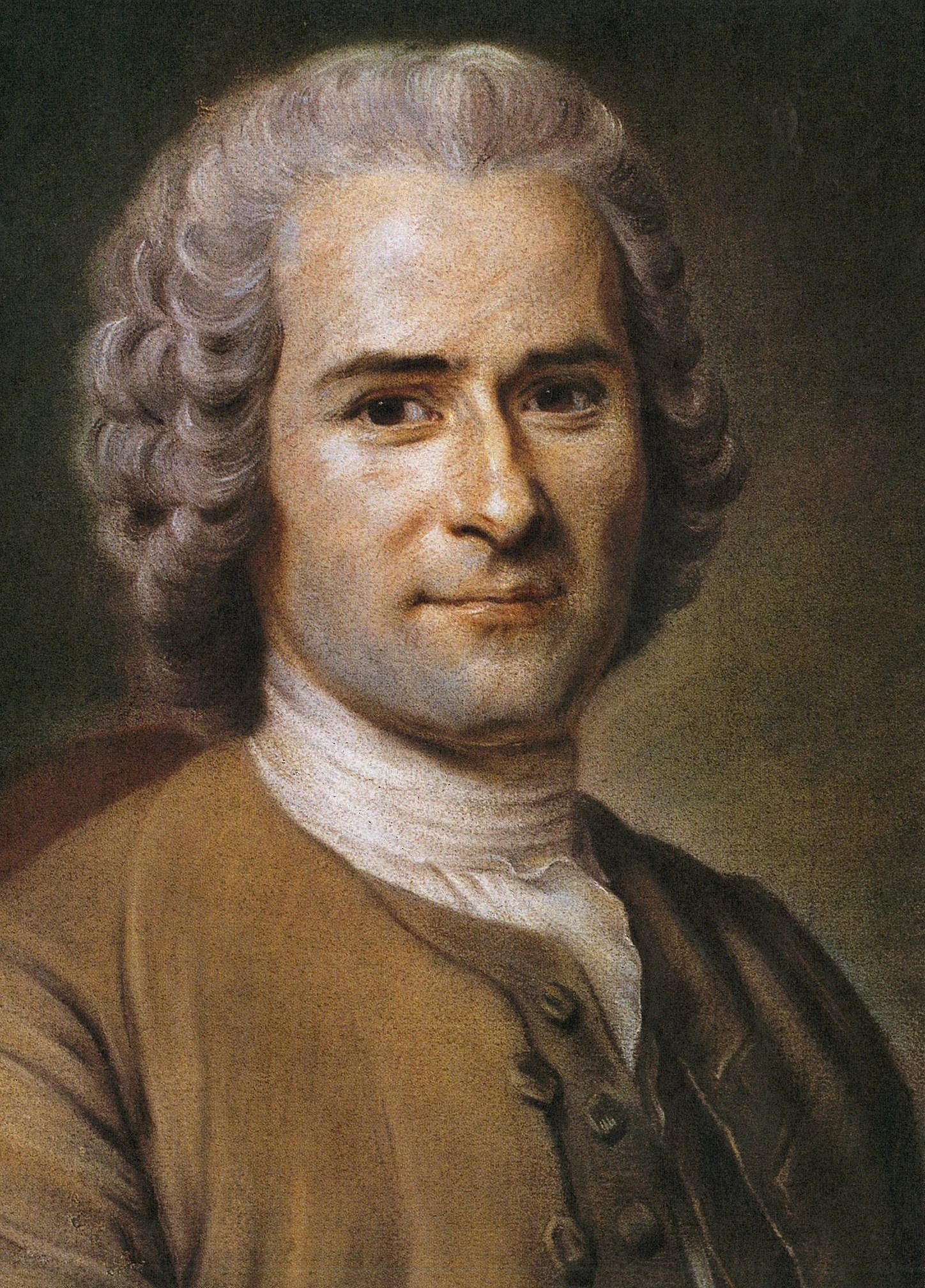
Jean-Jacques Rousseau

- Some literature:
  - Discourse on Inequality, 1755
  - On the Social Contract, 1762

=== Denis Diderot ===
Denis Diderot (France, 1713–1784)

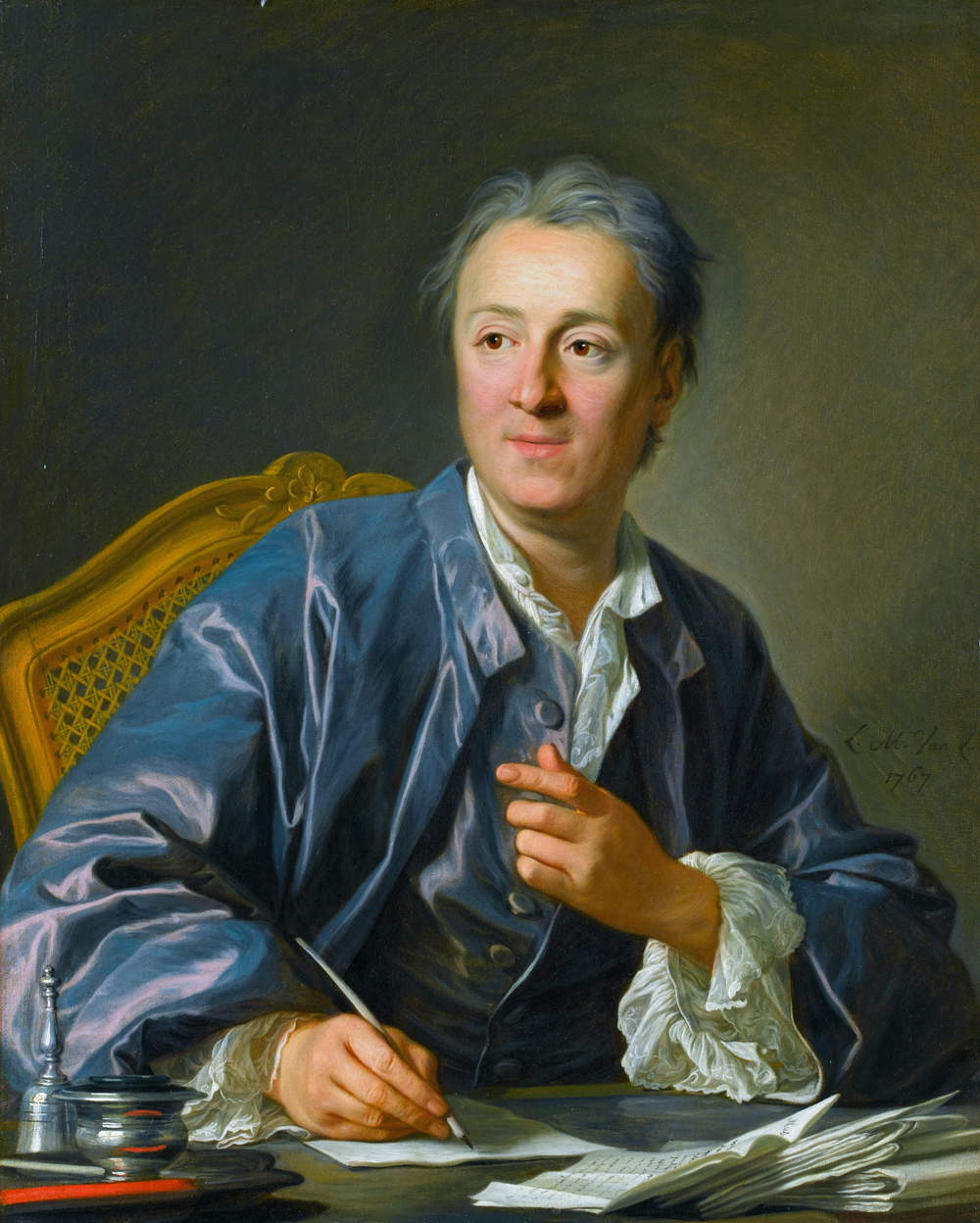
Denis Diderot

- Some literature:
  - Encyclopédie, ou dictionnaire raisonné des sciences, des arts et des métiers (together with others), 1751–1772 (Encyclopaedia, or Reasoned Dictionary of the Sciences, Arts, and Trades)

=== Jean le Rond d'Alembert ===
Jean le Rond d'Alembert (France, 1717–1783)

- Some literature:
  - Encyclopédie, ou dictionnaire raisonné des sciences, des arts et des métiers (together with others), 1751–1772 (Encyclopaedia, or Reasoned Dictionary of the Sciences, Arts, and Trades)

=== Richard Price ===
Richard Price (United Kingdom, 1723–1791)

- Some literature:
  - Appeal to the Public on the Subject of the National Debt, 1771
  - Observations on Reversionary Payments, 1771
  - Observations on Civil Liberty and the Justice and Policy of the War with America, 1776

=== Adam Smith ===
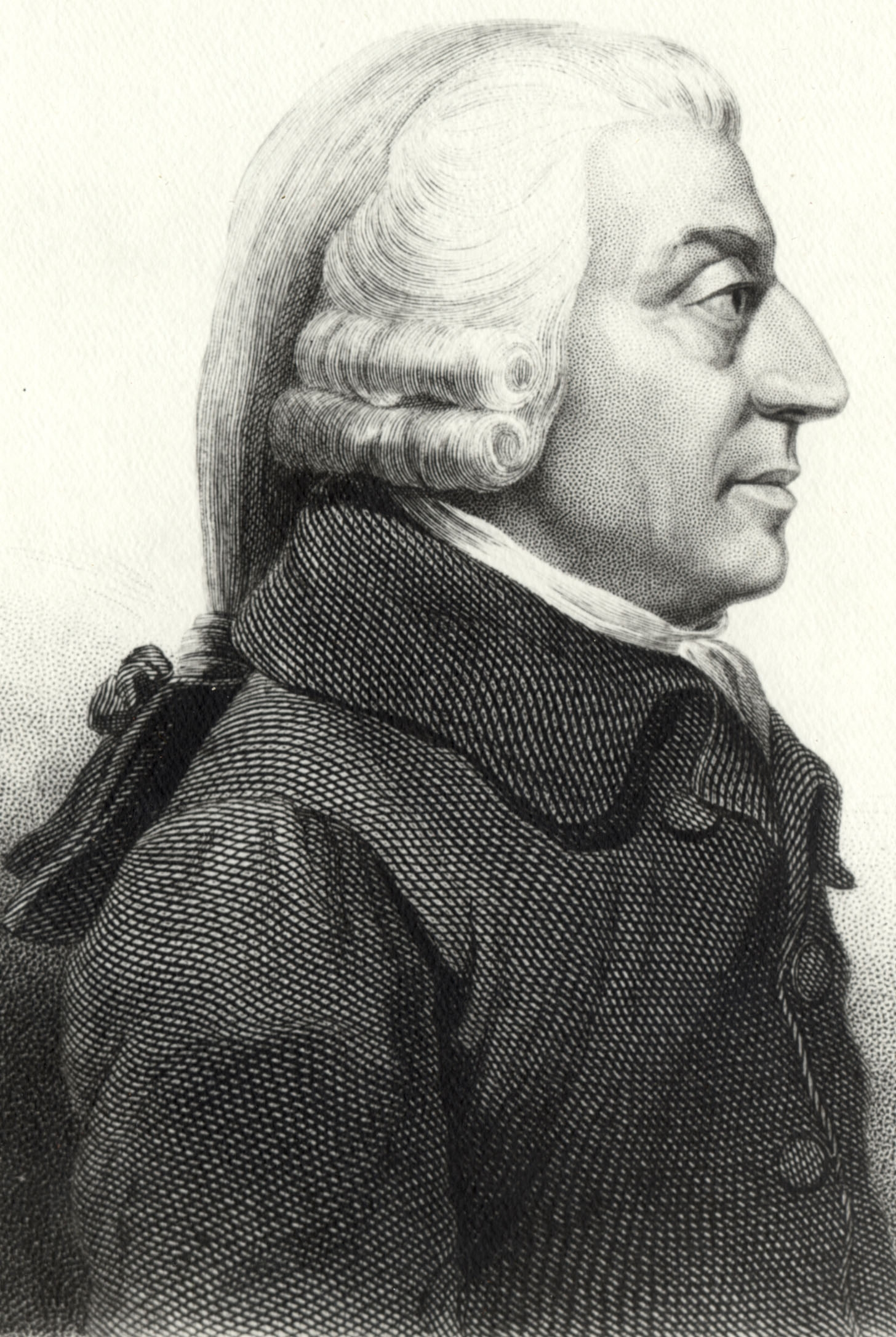
Adam Smith

Adam Smith (Great Britain, 1723–1790), often considered the founder of modern economics, was a key figure in formulating and advancing economic doctrine of free trade and competition. In his Wealth of Nations Adam Smith outlined the key idea that if the economy is basically left to its own devices, limited and finite resources will be put to ultimately their most efficient use through people acting purely in their self-interest. This concept has been quoted out of context by later economists as the invisible hand of the market.

Smith also advanced property rights and personal civil liberties, including stopping slavery, which today partly form the basic liberal ideology. He was also opposed to stock-holding companies, what today is called a "corporation", because he predicated the self-policing of the free market upon the free association of moral individuals.

- Some literature:
  - An Inquiry into the Nature and Causes of the Wealth of Nations, 1776
  - The Theory of Moral Sentiments, 1759

=== Immanuel Kant ===
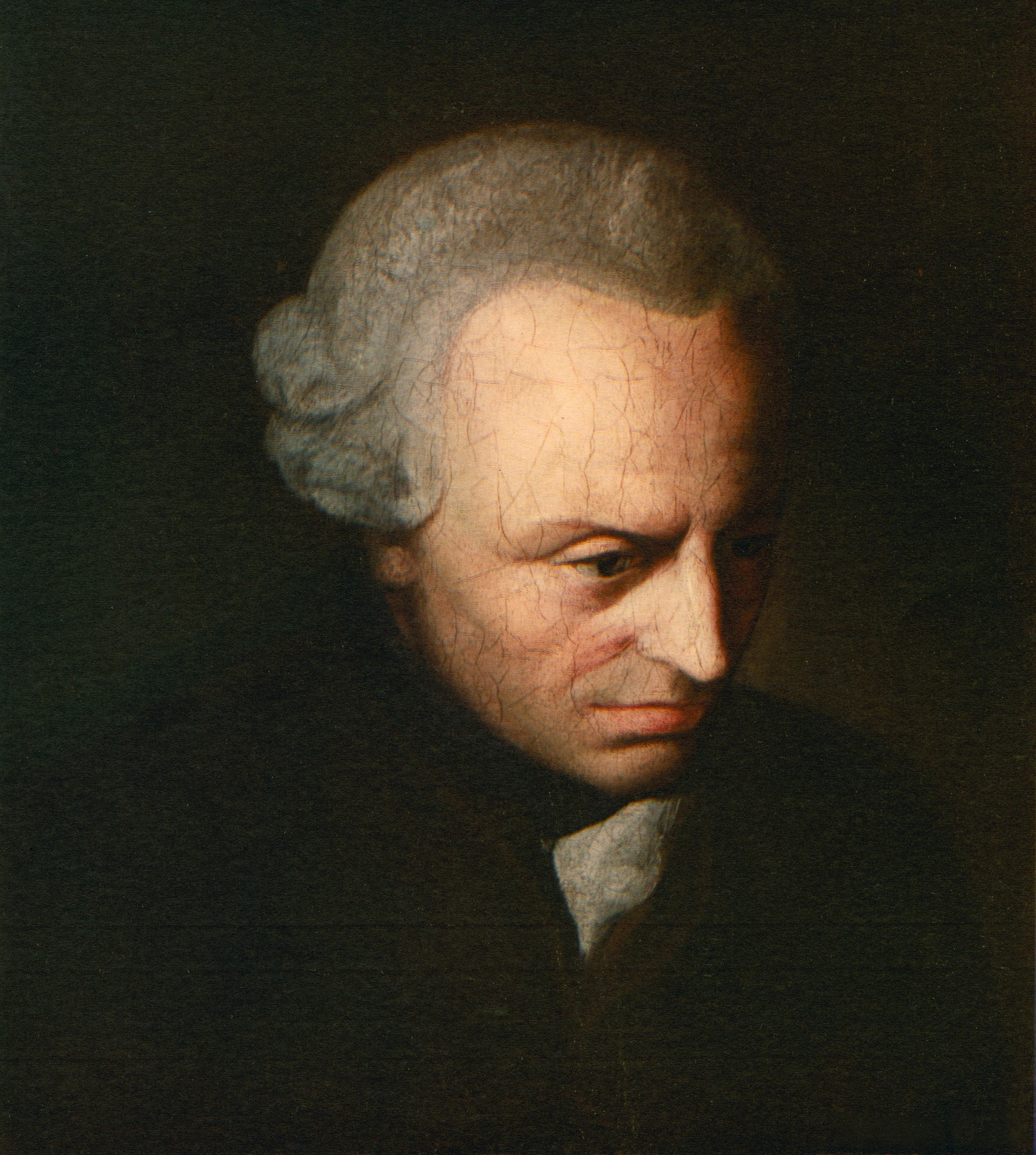
Immanuel Kant

Immanuel Kant (Germany, 1724–1804)

- Some literature:
  - Grundlegung zur Metaphysik der Sitten, 1785 (Fundamental Principles of the Metaphysic of Morals)
  - Kritik der praktischen Vernunft, 1788 (Critique of Practical Reason)
  - Über den Gemeinspruch: Das mag in der Theorie richtig sein, taugt aber nicht für die Praxis, 1793 (On the common saying: this may be true in theory but it does not apply in practice)
  - Zum ewigen Frieden, 1795 (Perpetual Peace)
  - Metaphysik der Sitten, 1797 (Metaphysics of Morals)

=== Anne Robert Jacques Turgot ===
Anne Robert Jacques Turgot (France, 1727–1781)

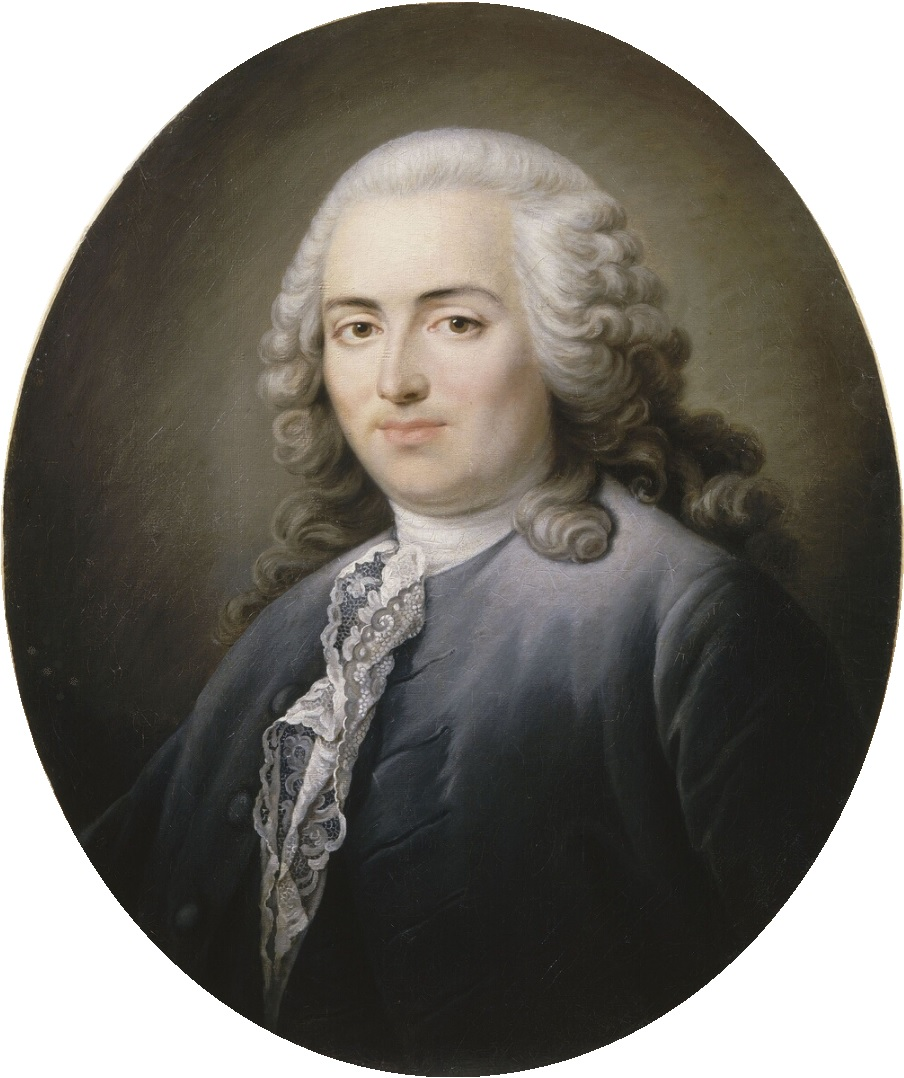
Anne Robert Jacques Turgot

- Some literature:
  - Le Conciliateur, 1754
  - Lettre sur la tolérance civile, 1754
  - Réflexions sur la formation et la distribution des richesses, 1766
  - Lettres sur la liberté du commerce des grains, 1770

=== Joseph Priestley ===
Joseph Priestley (United Kingdom/United States, 1733–1804)

- Some literature:
  - Essay on the First Principles of Government, 1768
  - The Present State of Liberty in Great Britain and her Colonies, 1769
  - Remarks on Dr Blackstone's Commentaries, 1769
  - Observations on Civil Liberty and the Nature and Justice of the War with America, 1772

=== August Ludwig von Schlözer ===
August Ludwig von Schlözer (Germany, 1735–1809)

=== Patrick Henry ===
Patrick Henry (United States, 1736–1799)

- Some literature:
  - "Give me liberty or give me death!", 1775

=== Thomas Paine ===
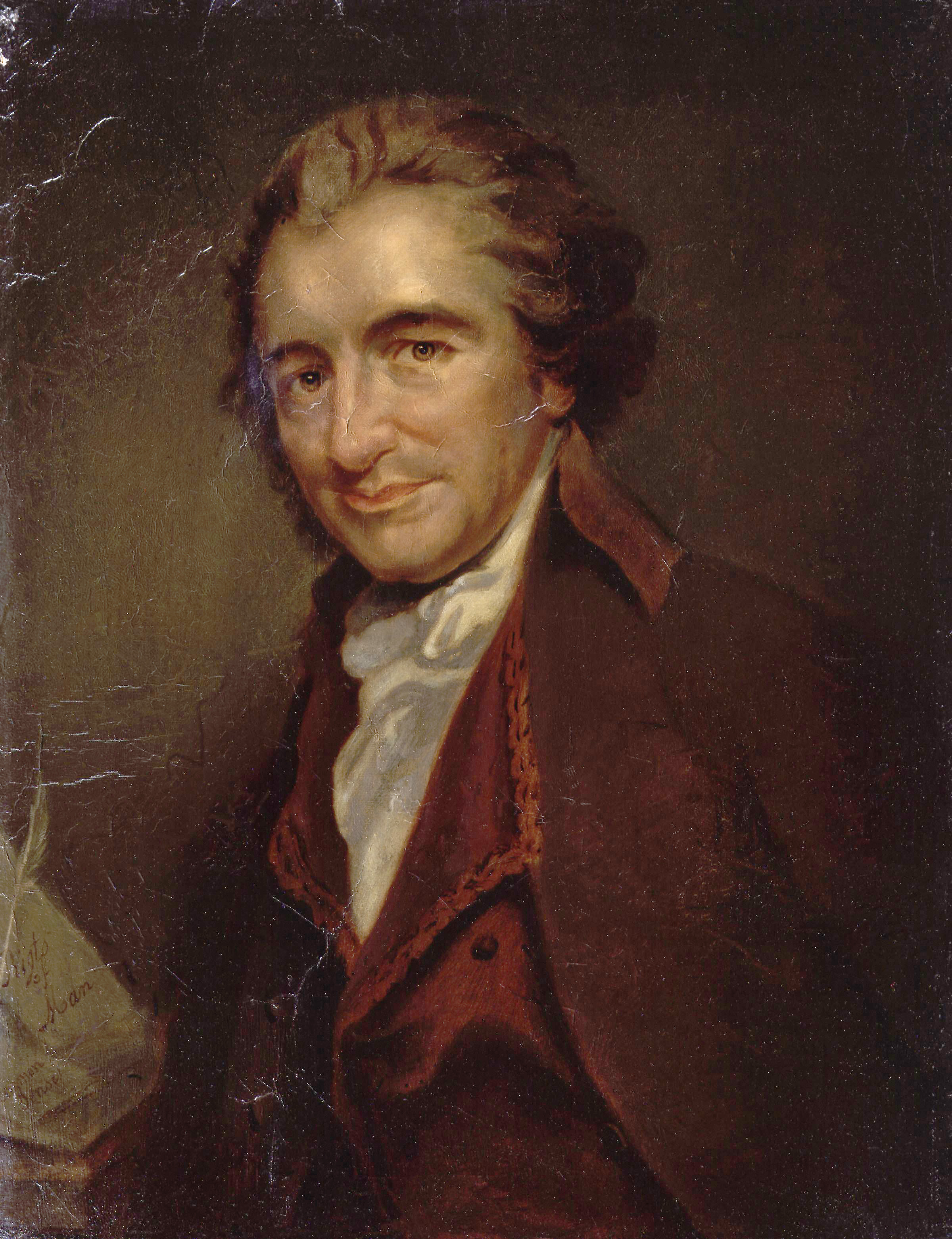
Thomas Paine

Thomas Paine (United Kingdom/United States, 1737–1809) was a Founding Father, political activist, philosopher, political theorist, and revolutionary. His ideas reflected Enlightenment-era ideals of human rights. Following the American Revolution he returned to England then fled to France, to avoid arrest because advocated the right of the people to overthrow their government. In the Age of Reason, he advocated Deism, promoted reason and freethought, and argued against religion in general and Christian doctrine in particular. In Agrarian Justice, opposed to Agrarian Law, and to Agrarian Monopoly sought the origins of poverty, locating them in inequitable distribution of land, "a violation of humankind's natural rights," which could be remedied through an estate tax.

- Some literature:
  - Common Sense (1776)
  - The American Crisis (1776–1783) pamphlets
  - Rights of Man, 1791–92
  - The Age of Reason (1793–1794).
  - Agrarian Justice, 1797

=== Thomas Jefferson ===
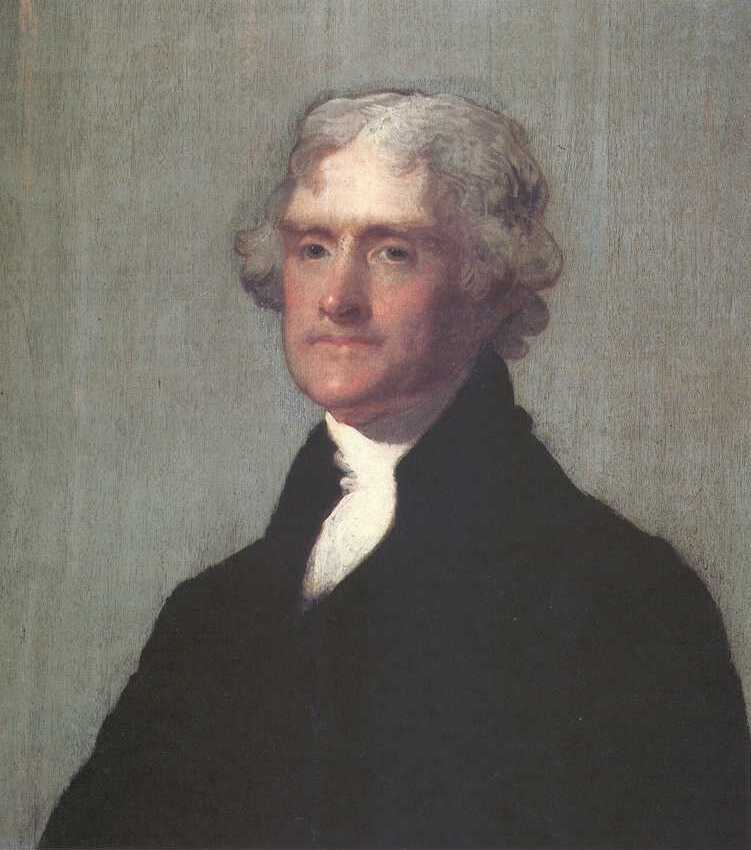
Thomas Jefferson

Thomas Jefferson (United States, 1743–1826) was the third President of the United States and author of the Declaration of Independence. He also wrote Notes on the State of Virginia and the Virginia Statute for Religious Freedom. Ideologically, he was a champion of inalienable individual rights, although excluded women from his formulation, and as a Virginia planter, he held many enslaved persons. He advocated the separation of church and state. His ideas were repeated in many other liberal revolutions around the world, including the (early) French Revolution.

Works:

- Declaration of Independence 1775

=== Marquis de Condorcet ===
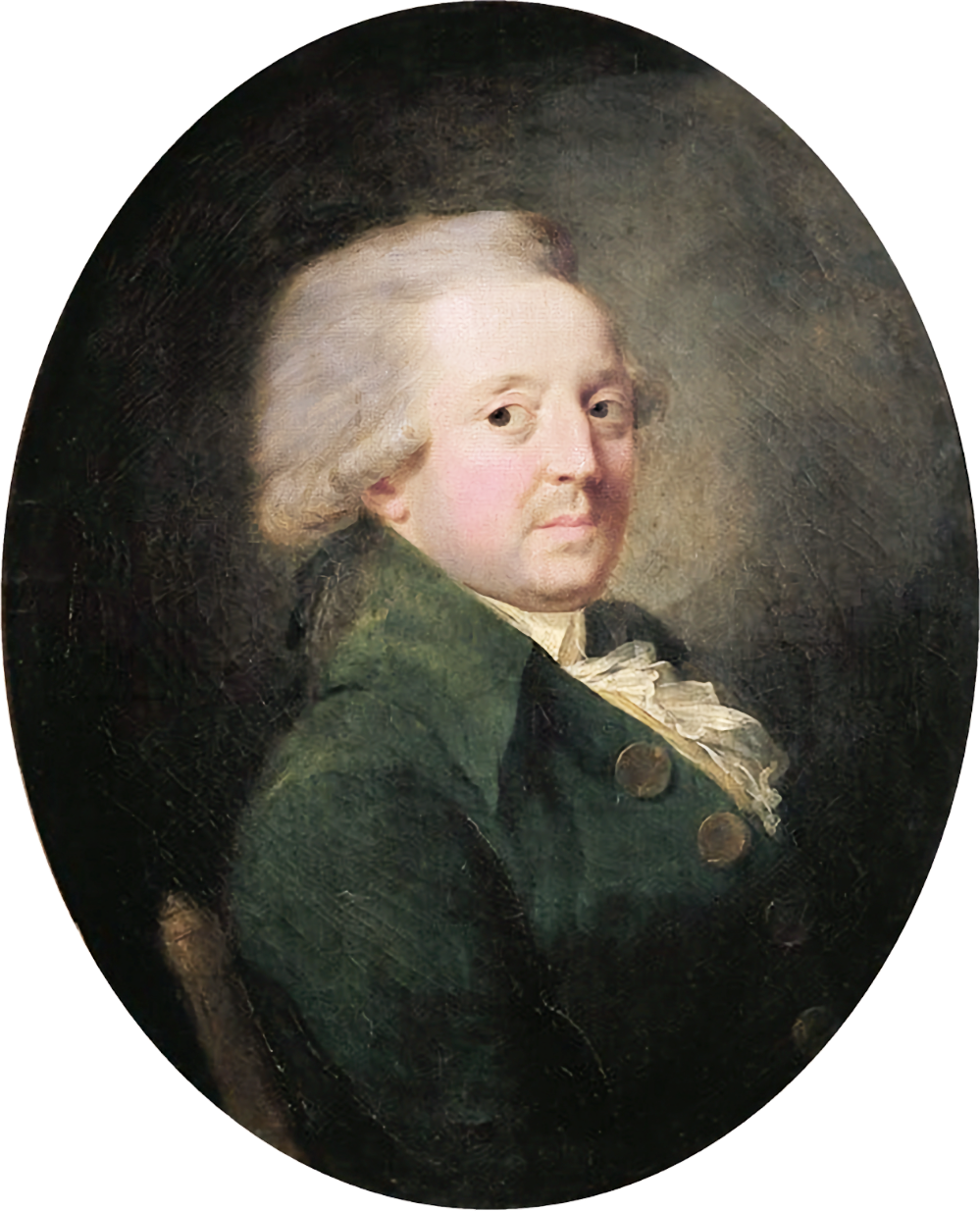
Marquis de Condorcet

Marquis de Condorcet (France, 1743–1794) advocated for a liberal economy, free and equal public instruction, constitutional government, and equal rights for women and people of all races, which embody the ideals of the Age of Enlightenment.

Some literature:

- Esquisse d'un tableau historique des progrés de l'esprit humain, 1795 (Sketch for a Historical Picture of the Progress of the Human Mind)

=== Olympe de Gouges ===
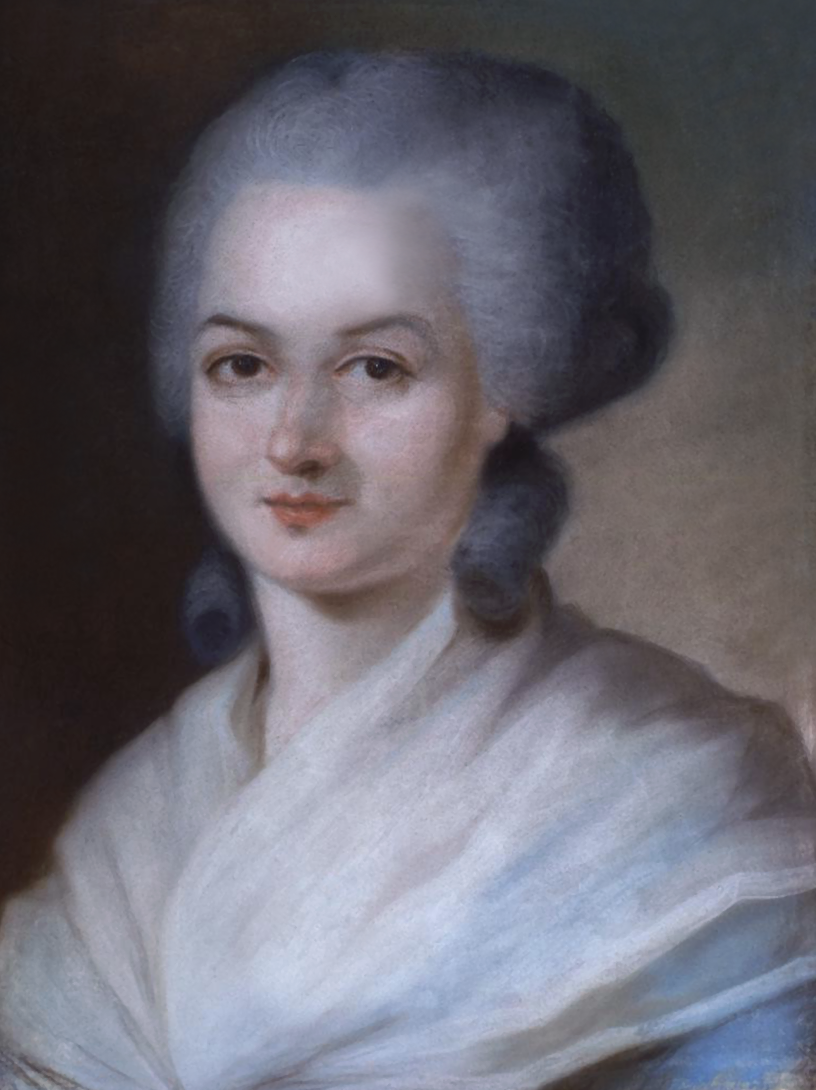
Olympe de Gouges

Olympe de Gouges (French, 1748–1793) is best known as an advocate of women's rights, writing Declaration of the Rights of Woman and of the Female Citizen, in response to the Declaration of the Rights of Man and of the Citizen (1789); she was executed during the French Revolution. Prior to the outbreak of the revolution, she authored Réflexions sur les hommes nègres (1788), calling for better treatment of black slaves. Her most famous quote is “A woman has the right to mount the scaffold. She must possess equally the right to mount the speaker's platform.”

Works:

- Declaration of the Rights of Woman and of the Female Citizen (1791)
- La Nécessité du divorce (The Necessity of Divorce)’’ 1790

=== Jeremy Bentham ===
Jeremy Bentham (England, 1748–1832)

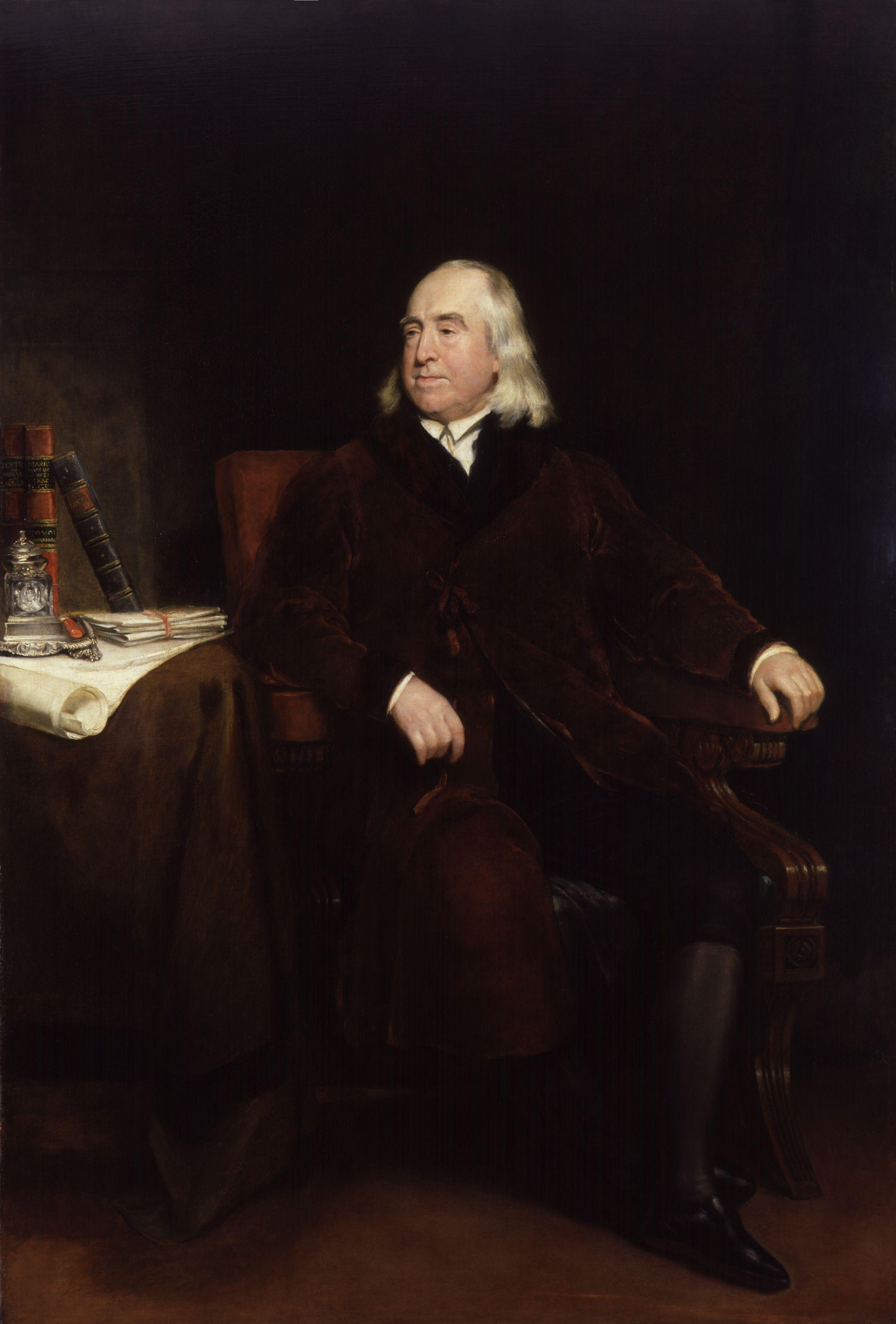
Jeremy Bentham

An early advocate of utilitarianism, animal welfare and women's rights. He had many students all around the world, including John Stuart Mill and several political leaders. Bentham demanded economic and individual freedom, including the separation of the state and church, freedom of expression, completely equal rights for women, the end of slavery and colonialism, uniform democracy, the abolition of physical punishment of adults and children, the right to divorce, free prices, free trade, and no restrictions on interest. Bentham was not a libertarian: he supported an inheritance tax, restrictions on monopoly power, pensions, health insurance, and other social security, but he called for prudence and careful consideration in any such governmental intervention.

=== Adamantios Korais ===
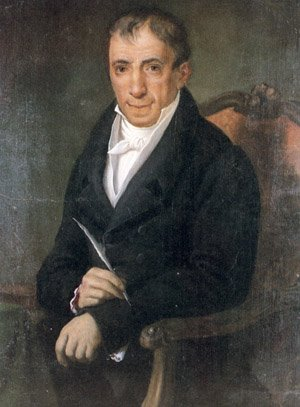
Adamantios Korais

Adamantios Korais (Smyrna, 1748–1833) A major figure of the Greek Enlightenment, Korais helped shape the modern Greek state with his theories on classical education, language, religion, secular law and constitutional government, with passionate views on the necessity of democracy. He corresponded with leading figures of the American republic, especially with Thomas Jefferson.

- Some literature:
  - Report on the Present State of Civilization in Greece, 1803
  - What Should We Greeks Do in the Present Circumstances?, 1805
  - The Library of Greek Literature, 1805–1826
  - Parerga, 1809–1827

=== Emmanuel Sieyès ===
Emmanuel Joseph Sieyès '(France, 1748–1836) played an important role in the opening years of the French Revolution, drafting the Declaration of the Rights of Man and of the Citizen, expanding on the theory of national sovereignty, popular sovereignty, and representation implied in his pamphlet What is the Third Estate?.

=== Charles James Fox ===
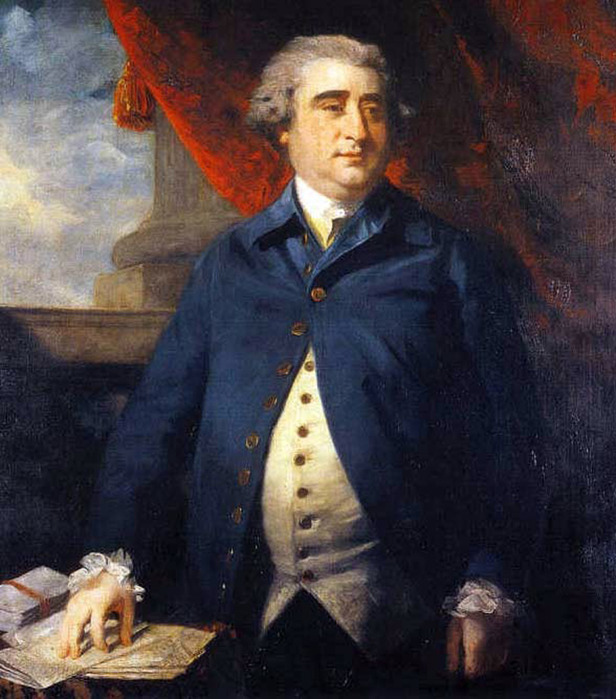
Charles James Fox by Joshua Reynolds

Charles James Fox (United Kingdom, 1749–1806) a Whig politician and member of parliament who spent most of his career in opposition. He opposed tyranny of any sort or the threat of it. For this reason he was a staunch critic of King George III whom he regarded as an aspiring tyrant. He was an abolitionist and supporter of American Patriots and of the French Revolution. He attacked Pitt's wartime legislation and defended the liberty of religious minorities and political radicals. After Pitt's death in January 1806, Fox served briefly as Foreign Secretary in the 'Ministry of All the Talents' of William Grenville.

- The Speeches of the Right Honourable Charles James Fox in the House of Commons.

=== Antoine Destutt de Tracy ===
Antoine Destutt de Tracy (1754–1836)

=== Stanisław Staszic ===
Stanisław Staszic (Poland-Lithuania, 1755–1826) was a Catholic priest, philosopher, geologist, writer, poet, translator and statesman. A physiocrat, monist, pan-Slavist (after 1815) and an advocate of laissez-faire, he supported many reforms in Poland. He is particularly remembered for his political writings during the "Great (Four-Year) Sejm" (1788–92) and for his support of the Constitution of 3 May 1791.

=== Friedrich Schiller ===
Friedrich Schiller (Germany, 1759–1805)

=== Mary Wollstonecraft ===
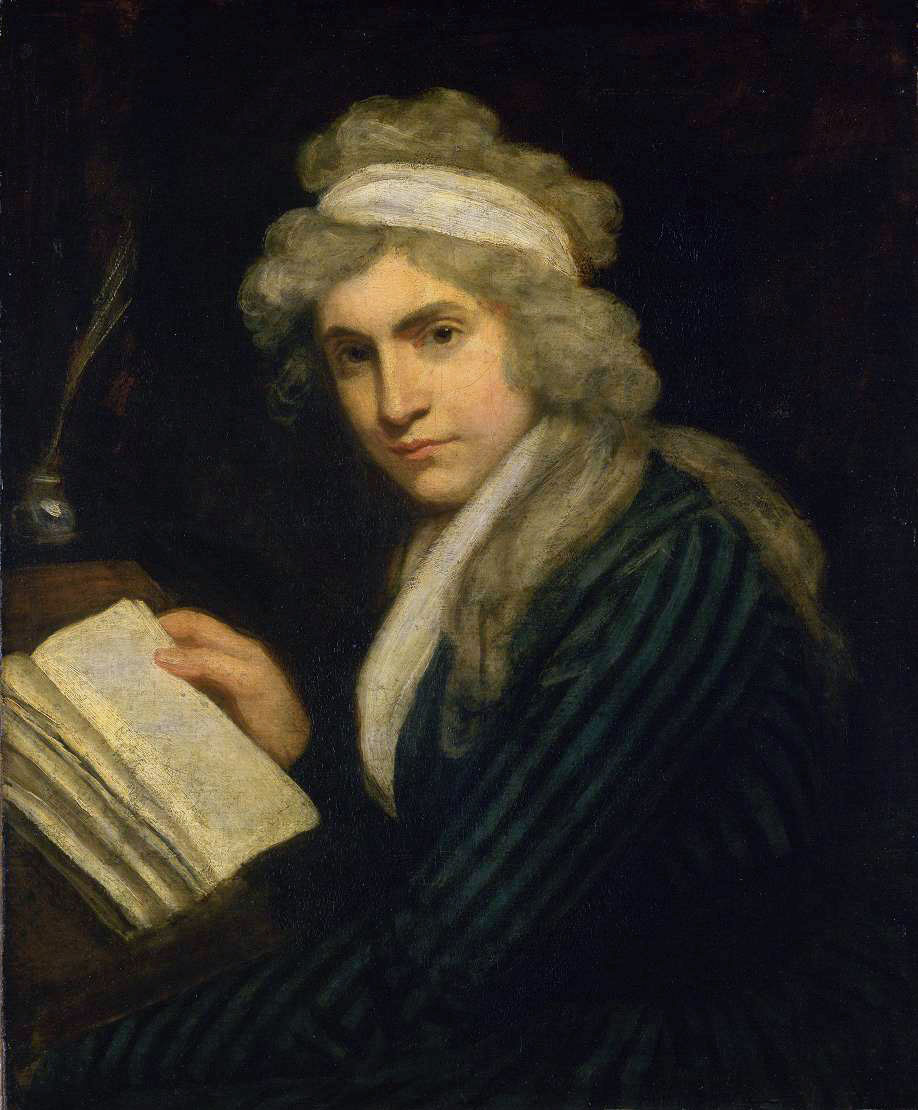
Mary Wollstonecraft

Mary Wollstonecraft (United Kingdom, 1759–1797) is best known for A Vindication of the Rights of Woman (1792), in which she argues that women are not naturally inferior to men but appear to be only because they lack education. She suggests that both men and women should be treated as rational beings and imagines a social order founded on reason. Works:

- Thoughts on the Education of Daughters 1787
- A Vindication of the Rights of Men 1790
- A Vindication of the Rights of Woman 1792

=== Anne Louise Germaine de Staël ===
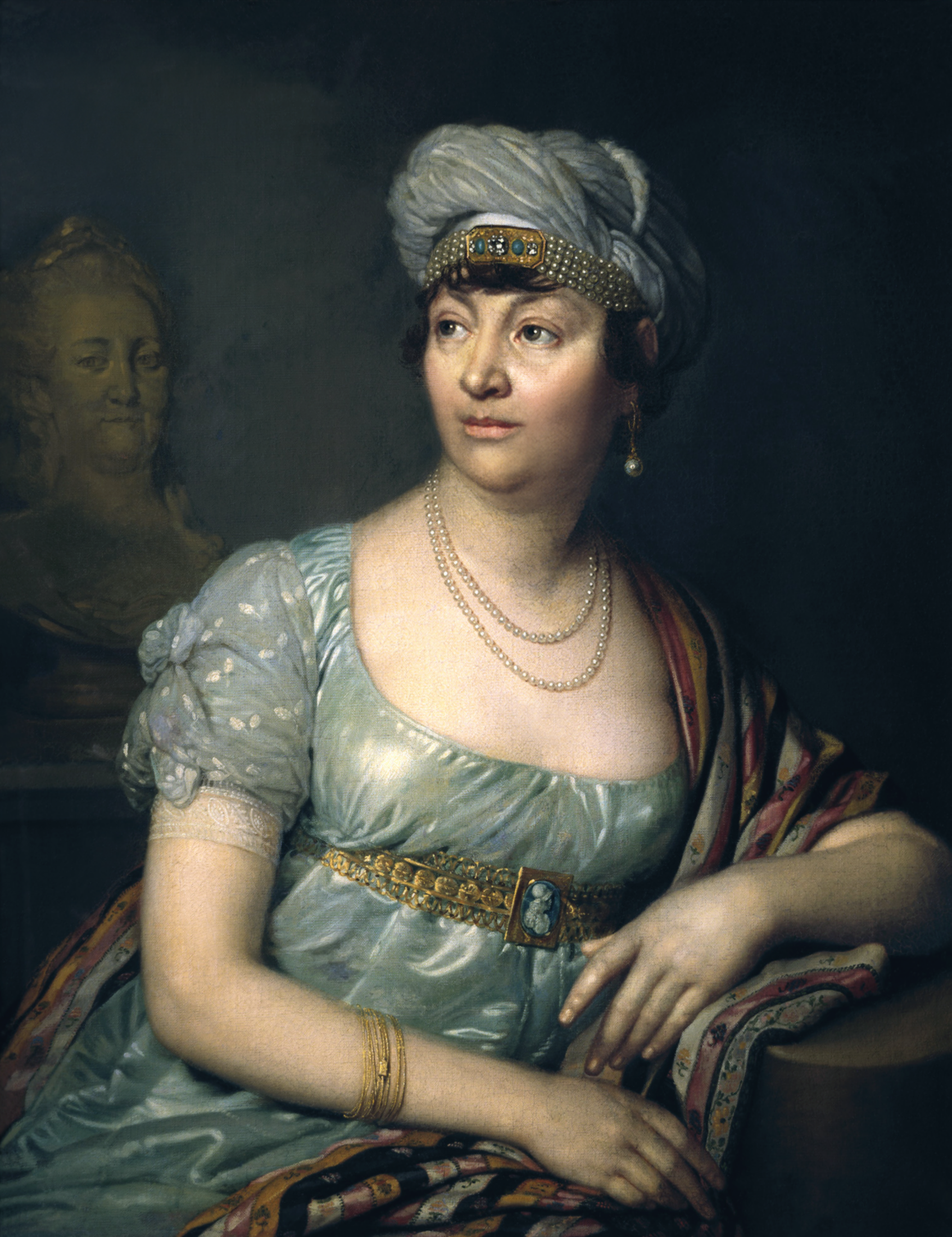
Madame de Staël

Anne Louise Germaine de Staël (France, 1766–1817)

- Some literature:
  - De l'influence des passions sur le bonheur des individus et des nations, 1796
  - Des circonstances actuelles qui peuvent terminer la Révolution et des principes qui doivent fonder la république en France, 1798
  - Considérations sur les principaux événements de la révolution française, 1813
  - Appel aux souverains réunis à Paris pour en obtenir l'abolition de la traite des nègres, 1814

=== Benjamin Constant ===
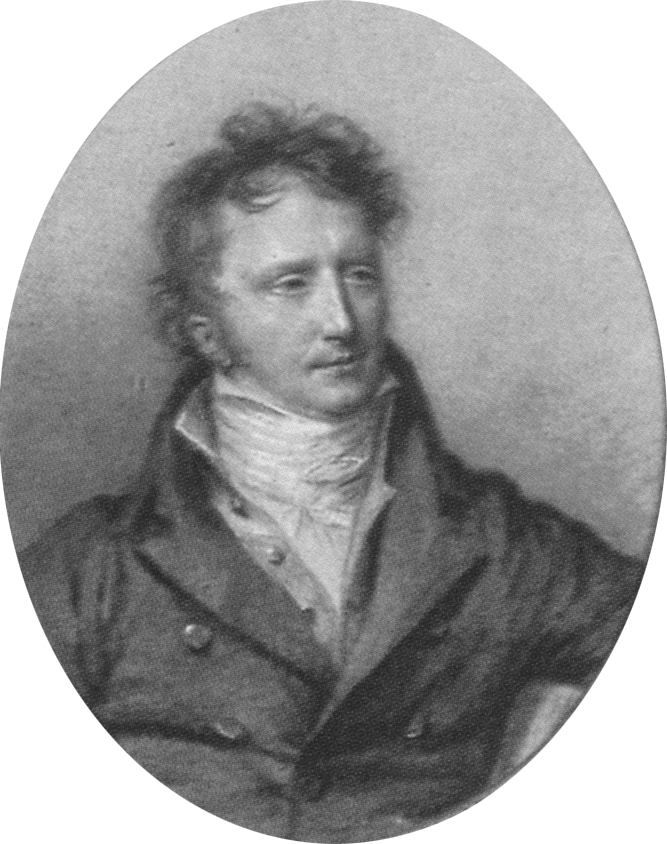
Benjamin Constant

Benjamin Constant (France, 1767–1830) Regarded by some as one of the fathers of modern liberalism, he was initially a republican during the French Revolution, but utterly rejected The Jacobins as an instance of the tyranny of the majority.

- Some literature:
  - De l'esprit de conquête et l'usurpation (On the spirit of conquest and on usurpation), 1814
  - Principes de Politique (Principles of Politics), 1815
  - "The Liberty of Ancients Compared with that of Moderns," 1819

=== Jean-Baptiste Say ===
Jean-Baptiste Say (France, 1767–1832)

- Some literature:
  - Traité d'économie politique (Treatise on Political Economy), 1803.

=== Wilhelm von Humboldt ===
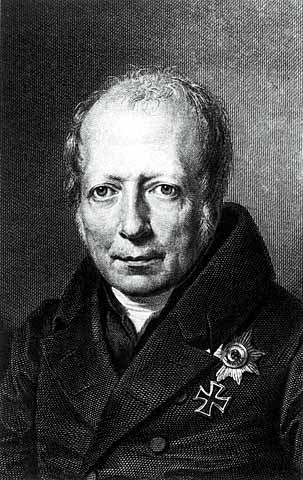
Wilhelm von Humboldt

Wilhelm von Humboldt (Germany, 1767–1835)

- Some literature:
  - Ideen zu einem Versuch, die Grenzen der Wirksamkeit des Staats zu bestimmen (On the Limits of State Action), 1792.

=== Adam Czartoryski ===
Adam Czartoryski (Poland-Lithuania 1770–1867) was a statesman, and international politician. He began as a foreign minister to the Russian Tsar Alexander I and built an anti-Napoleon coalition. He became a leader of the Polish government in exile, and an enemy of Russian Tsar Nicholas I. In exile he was an activist on the Polish Question across Europe, and stimulated early Balkan independence.

- Some literature:
  - Essai sur la diplomatie (Marseilles, 1830);
  - Life of J. U. Niemcewicz (Paris, 1860);
  - Alexander I. et Czartoryski: correspondence ... et conversations (1801–1823)
  - Memoirs of Czartoryski, with documents relating to his negotiations with Pitt, and conversations with Palmerston in 1832

=== David Ricardo ===
David Ricardo (United Kingdom, 1772–1823)

=== James Mill ===
James Mill (United Kingdom, 1773–1836)

- Some literature:
  - Elements of Political Economy, 1821

=== Antoine-Elisée Cherbuliez ===
Antoine-Elisée Cherbuliez (Switzerland, 1797–1869)

=== Johan Rudolf Thorbecke ===
The Dutch statesman Johan Rudolf Thorbecke (Netherlands, 1798–1872) was the main theorist of Dutch liberalism in the nineteenth century, outlining a more democratic alternative to the absolute monarchy, the constitutional monarchy. The constitution of 1848 was mainly his work. His main theoretical article specifically labeled as 'liberal' was 'Over het hedendaagsche staatsburgerschap' (On Modern Citizenship) from 1844. He became prime minister in 1849, thus starting numerous fundamental reforms in Dutch politics.

=== Frédéric Bastiat ===
Frédéric Bastiat (France, 1801–1850)

Claude Frédéric Bastiat was a French classical liberal theorist, political economist, and member of the French assembly.

- Some literature:
  - La Loi (The Law), 1849
  - Harmonies économiques (Economic Harmonies), 1850
  - Ce qu'on voit et ce qu'on ne voit pas (What is Seen and What is Not Seen), 1850

=== Rifa'a al-Tahtawi ===
Rifa'a al-Tahtawi (Egypt, 1801–1873)

Rifa'a al-Tahtawi (also spelt Tahtawy) was an Egyptian writer, teacher, translator, Egyptologist, renaissance intellectual and one of the early adapters to Islamic Modernism. In 1831, Tahtawi was part of the statewide effort to modernize the Egyptian infrastructure and education. Three of his published volumes were works of political and moral philosophy. They introduced his Egyptian audience to Enlightenment ideas such as secular authority and political rights and liberty; his ideas regarding how a modern civilized society ought to be and what constituted by extension a civilized or "good Egyptian"; and his ideas on public interest and public good. Tahtawi's work was the first effort in what became an Egyptian renaissance (nahda) that flourished in the years between 1860 and 1940.

- Works:
  - A Paris Profile, written during Tahtawi's stay in France.
  - The methodology of Egyptians minds with regard to the marvels of modern literature, published in 1869 crystallizing Tahtawi's opinions on modernization.
  - The honest guide for education of girls and boys, published in 1873 and reflecting the main precepts of Tahtawi's educational thoughts.
  - Tawfik al-Galil insights into Egypt's and Ismail descendants' history, the first part of the History Encyclopedia published in 1868 and tracing the history of ancient Egypt till the dawn of Islam.
  - A thorough summary of the biography of Mohammed published after Tahtawi's death, recording a comprehensive account of the life of Prophet Mohammed and the political, legal and administrative foundations of the first Islamic state.
  - Towards a simpler Arabic grammar, published in 1869.
  - Grammatical sentences, published in 1863.
  - Egyptian patriotic lyrics, written in praise of Khedive Said and published in 1855.
  - The luminous stars in the moonlit nights of al-Aziz, a collection of congratulatory writings to some princes, published in 1872.

=== Harriet Martineau ===
Harriet Martineau (United Kingdom, 1802–1876)

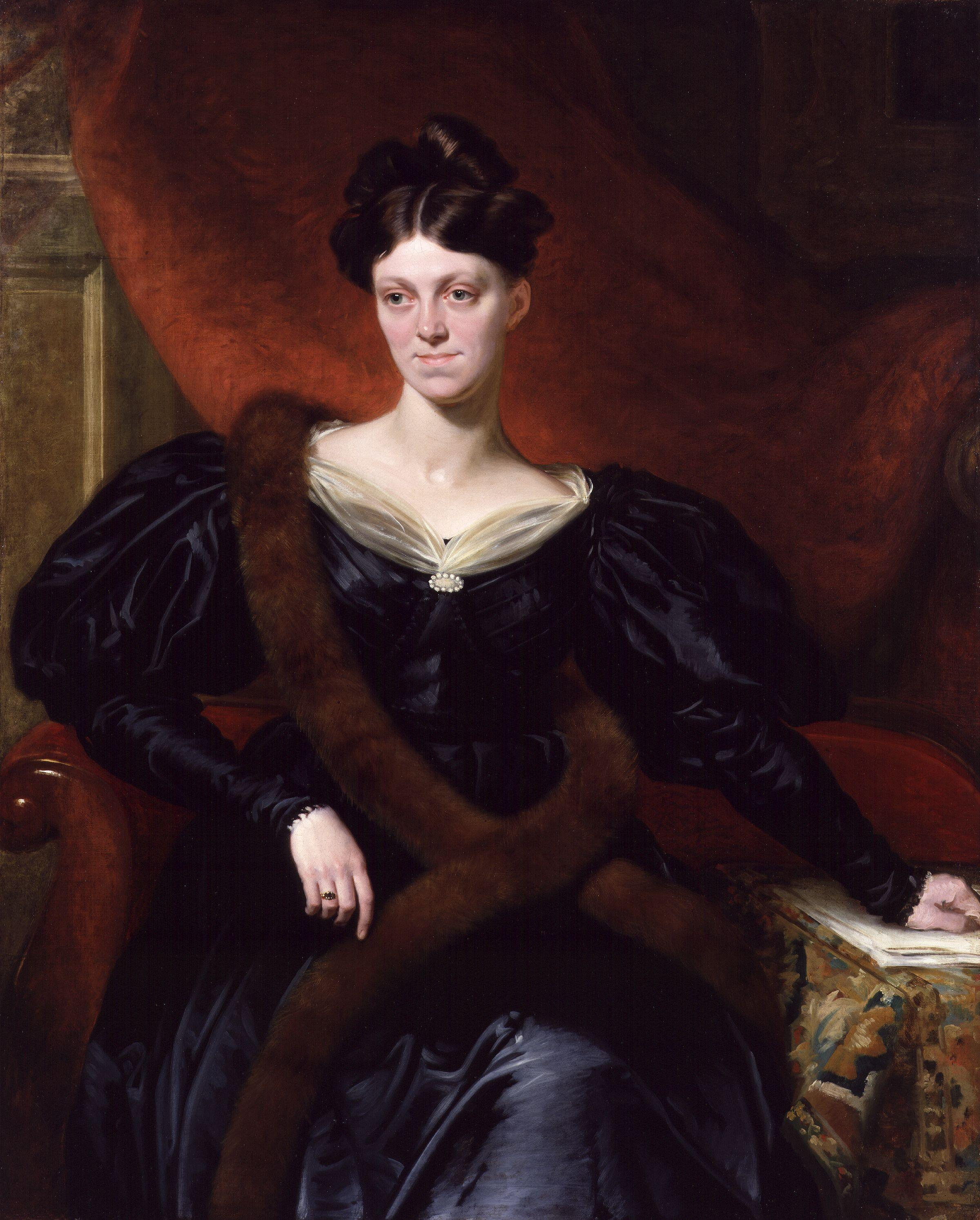
Harriet Martineau

- Some literature:
  - Illustrations of Political Economy, 1832–1834
  - Theory and Practice of Society in America, 1837
  - The Martyr Age of the United States, 1839

=== Alexis de Tocqueville ===
Alexis de Tocqueville (France, 1805–1859)

- Some literature:
  - De La Démocratie en Amérique, 1831–1840 (Democracy in America)
  - L'Ancien Régime et la Révolution, 1856

== Mill and further ==
=== John Stuart Mill ===
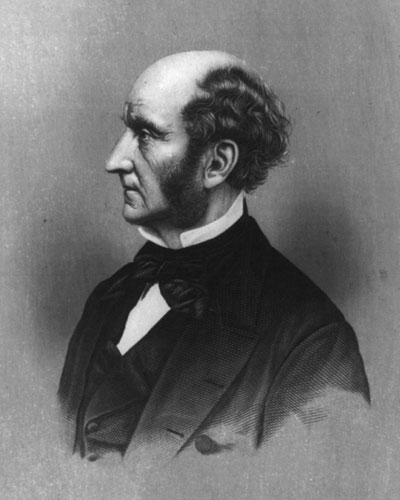
John Stuart Mill

John Stuart Mill (United Kingdom, 1806–1873) is one of the first champions of modern "liberalism." As such, his work on political economy and logic helped lay the foundation for advancements in empirical science and public policy based on verifiable improvements. Strongly influenced by Bentham's utilitarianism, he disagrees with Kant's intuitive notion of right and formulates the "highest normative principle" of morals as: Actions are right in proportion as they tend to promote happiness; wrong as they tend to produce the reverse of happiness.

Some consider Mill as the founder of Social liberalism. Although Mill was mainly for free markets, he accepted interventions in the economy, such as a tax on alcohol, if there were sufficient utilitarian grounds. Mill was also a champion of women's rights.

- Some literature:
  - Considerations On Representative Government, 1862
  - On Liberty, 1868
  - Socialism, 1879

=== José María Luis Mora ===
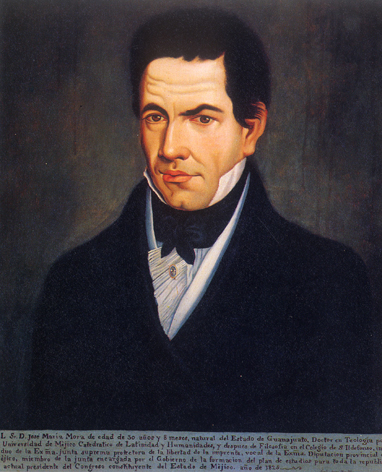
José María Luis Mora

José María Luis Mora (New Spain/Mexico 1794 – 1850) was a priest, lawyer, historian, politician and liberal ideologist. Considered one of the first supporters of liberalism in Mexico, he fought for the separation of church and state. Mora has been deemed "the most significant liberal spokesman for his generation [and] his thought epitomizes the structure and the predominant orientation of Mexican liberalism." Some works:

- Catecismo político de la federación mexicana. Mexico 1831
- Disertación sobre la naturaleza y aplicación de las rentas y bienes eclesiásticas, y sobre la autoridad a que se hallan sujetos en cuanto a su creación, aumento, sustencia o supresión. Mexico 1833.

=== Ralph Waldo Emerson ===
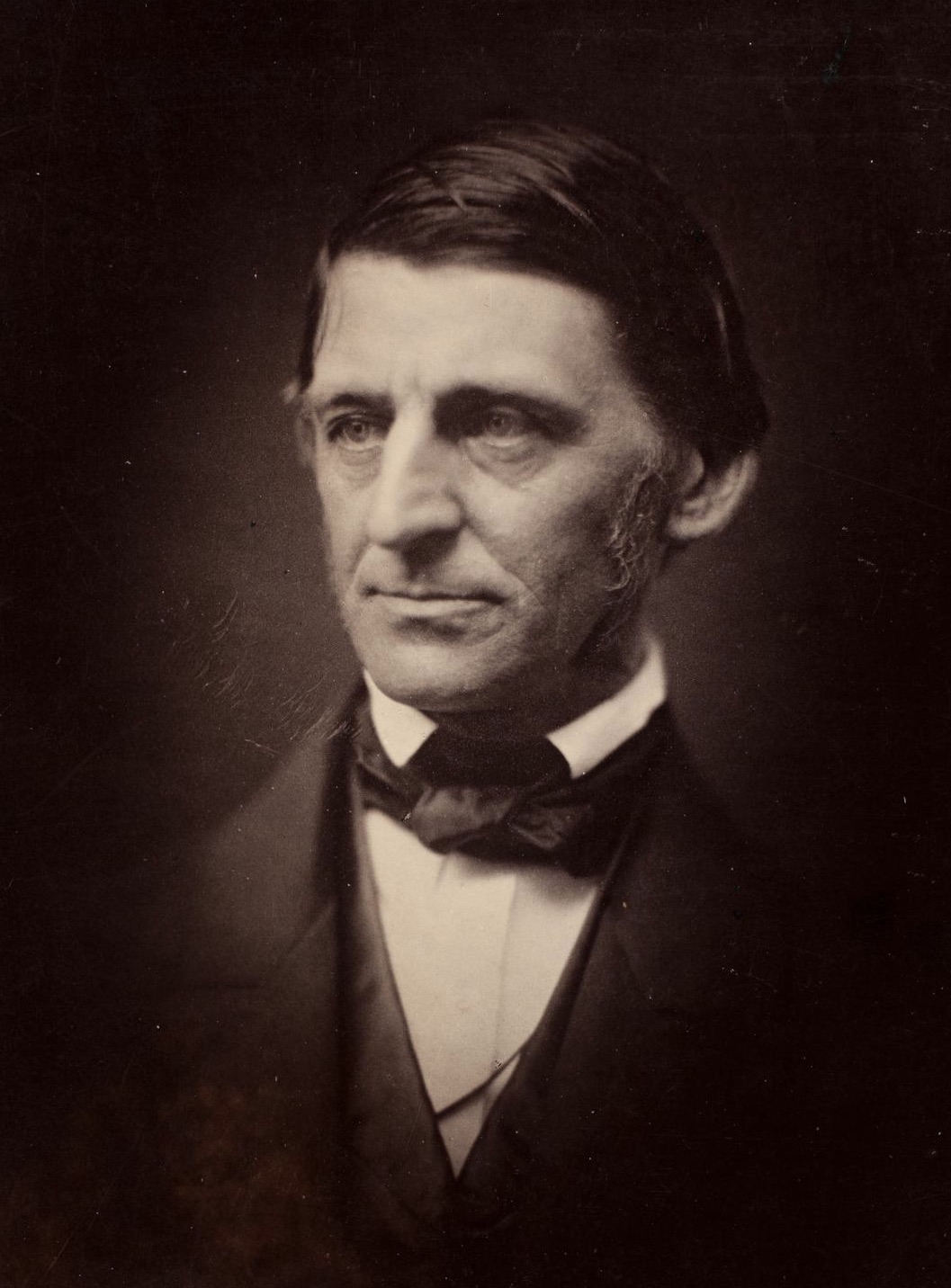
Ralph Waldo Emerson

Ralph Waldo Emerson (United States, 1803–1882) was an American philosopher who argued that the basic principles of government were mutable, and that government is required only insofar as people are not self-governing. Proponent of Democracy, and of the idea that a democratic people must have a democratic ethics.

- Some literature:
  - Self-Reliance
  - Circles
  - Politics
  - The Nominalist and the Realist

=== William Lloyd Garrison ===
William Lloyd Garrison (United States, 1805–1879)

- Some literature:
  - Articles advocating abolition of slavery in the newspaper The Liberator, 1831–1866

=== Juan Bautista Alberdi ===
Juan Bautista Alberdi (Argentina, 1810–1884)

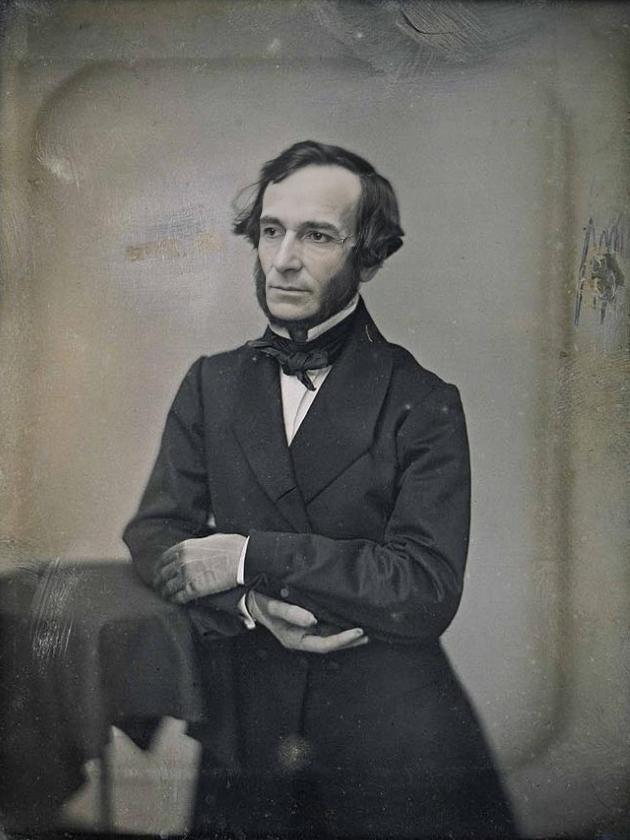
Juan Bautista Alberdi

- Some literature:
  - Bases y puntos de partida para la organización política de la República Argentina (Bases and Points of Departure for the Political Organization of the Argentine Republic), 1852
  - Sistema económico y rentistico de la Confederación Argentina, según su Constitución de 1853 (Economic and rentistic system of the Argentine Confederation, according to its 1853 Constitution), 1854

=== Henry David Thoreau ===
Henry David Thoreau (1817–1862)

- Some literature:
  - Civil Disobedience
  - Walden

=== Jacob Burckhardt ===
Jacob Burckhardt (Switzerland, 1818–1897) State as derived from cultural and economic life.

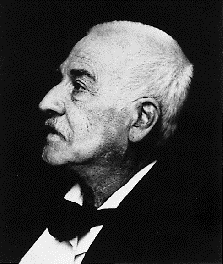
Jocob Burckhardt

- Some literature:
  - The Civilization of the Renaissance in Italy

=== Herbert Spencer ===
Herbert Spencer (United Kingdom, 1820–1903), philosopher, psychologist, and sociologist, advanced what he called the "Law of equal liberty" and argued against liberal theory promoting more activist government, which he dubbed "a new form of Toryism." He supported a state limited in its duties to the defense of persons and their property. For Spencer, voluntary cooperation was the hallmark of the most vibrant form of society, accommodating the widest diversity of members and the greatest diversity of goals. Spencer's evolutionary approach has been characterized as an extension of Adam Smith's "invisible hand" explanation of economic order; his extensive work on sympathy (in psychology as well as the foundation of ethics, particularly in The Data of Ethics) explicitly carried on Smith's approach in The Theory of Moral Sentiments. Spencer is frequently characterized as a leading Social Darwinist.

- Some literature:
  - Social Statics, 1851
  - Principles of Ethics, 1879, 1892
  - The Man versus the State, 1884
  - Essays, Scientific, Political and Speculative, 1892

=== İbrahim Şinasi ===
İbrahim Şinasi (Ottoman Empire, 1826–1871), author, journalist, translator, and newspaper editor. He was the innovator of several fields: he wrote one of the earliest examples of an Ottoman play, he encouraged the trend of translating poetry from French into Turkish, he simplified the script used for writing the Ottoman Turkish language, and he was one of the first of the Ottoman writers to write specifically for the broader public. Şinasi used his newspapers, Tercüman-ı Ahvâl and Tasvîr-i Efkâr, to promote the proliferation of European Enlightenment ideals during the Tanzimat period, and he made the education of the literate Ottoman public his personal vocation. Though many of Şinasi's projects were incomplete at the time of his death, "he was at the forefront of a number of fields and put his stamp on the development of each field so long as it contained unsolved problems." Şinasi, influenced by Enlightenment thought, saw freedom of expression as a fundamental right and used journalism in order to engage, communicate with, and educate the public. By speaking directly to the public about government affairs, Şinasi declared that state actions were not solely the interest of the government.

- Works:
  - Tercüme-i Manzume (1859, translation of poems from the French of La Fontaine, Lamartine, Gilbert, and Racine)
  - Şair Evlenmesi (1859, the first Ottoman play, "The Wedding of a Poet")
  - Durub-i Emsal-i Osmaniye (1863, the first book of Turkish proverbs)
  - Müntahabat-ı Eş'ar (1863, collection of poems)

=== Thomas Hill Green ===
Thomas Hill Green (United Kingdom, 1836–1882)

=== Auberon Herbert ===
Auberon Herbert (United Kingdom, 1838–1906)

=== Carl Menger ===
Carl Menger (Austria, 1840–1921)

- Some literature:
  - Grundsätze der Volkswirtschaftslehre (Principles of Economics), 1871
  - Untersuchungen über die Methode der Sozialwissenschaften und der Politischen Ökonomie insbesondere (Investigations into the Method of the Social Sciences: with special reference to economics), 1883
  - Irrthumer des Historismus in der deutschen Nationalokonomie (The Errors of Historicism in German Economics), 1884
  - Zur Theorie des Kapitals (The Theory of Capital), 1888

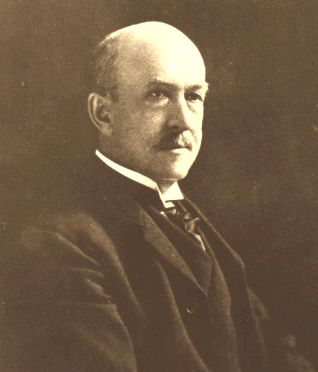
William Graham Sumner

=== William Graham Sumner ===
William Graham Sumner (United States, 1840–1910)

- Some literature:
  - Socialism, 1878
  - The Argument Against Protective Tariffs, 1881
  - Protective Taxes and Wages, 1883
  - The Absurd Effort to Make the World Over, 1883
  - State Interference, 1887
  - Protectionism: the -ism which teaches that waste makes wealth, 1887
  - The Forgotten Man, and Other Essays, 1917

=== Lester Frank Ward ===
Lester Frank Ward (United States, 1841–1913)

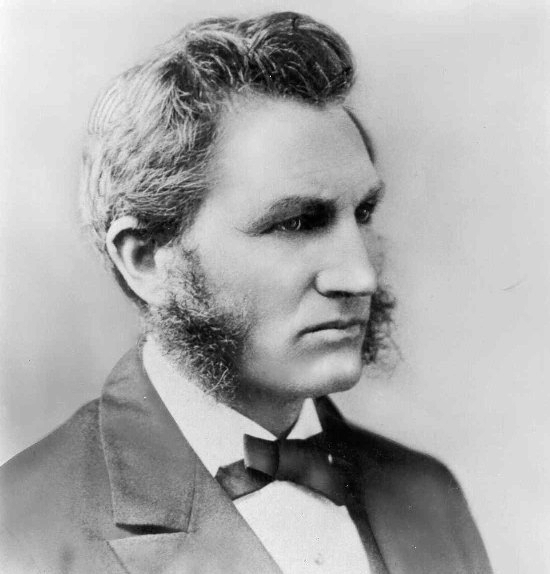
Lester Frank Ward

Lester Ward was a botanist, paleontologist, and sociologist. He served as the first president of the American Sociological Association. Ward was a fierce and unrelenting critic of the laissez-faire policies advocated by Herbert Spencer and William Graham Sumner.

- Some literature:
- (1883) Dynamic Sociology: Or Applied social science as based upon statical sociology and the less complex sciences.
- (1893) The Psychic Factors of Civilization, 1893.
- (1903) Pure Sociology. A Treatise on the Origin and Spontaneous Development of Society.
- (1906) Applied Sociology. A Treatise on the Conscious Improvement of Society by Society.

Ward's major works can be found at the McMaster University, Faculty of Social Sciences website.

=== Lujo Brentano ===
Ludwig Joseph Brentano (Germany, 1844–1931)

=== Tomáš Masaryk ===
Tomáš Garrigue Masaryk (Czechoslovakia, 1850–1937)

=== Eugen von Böhm-Bawerk ===
Eugen von Böhm-Bawerk (Austria, 1851–1914)

- Some literature:
  - Kapital und Kapitalzins (Capital and Interest), in three volumes, 1884, 1889 and 1909
  - Die Positive Theorie des Kapitals (The positive theory of capital and its critics), in three volumes, 1895 and 1896
  - Zum Abschluss des Marxschen Systems (Karl Marx and the Close of his system),1898

=== Louis Brandeis ===
Louis Brandeis (1856–1941)

=== Thorstein Veblen ===
Thorstein Veblen (1857–1926) is best known as the author of Theory of the Leisure Class. Veblen was influential to a generation of American liberalism searching for a rational basis for the economy beyond corporate consolidation and "cut throat competition". Veblen's central argument was that individuals require sufficient non-economic time to become educated citizens. He caustically attacked pure material consumption for its own sake, and the idea that utility equalled conspicuous consumption.

=== John Dewey ===
John Dewey (United States, 1859–1952)

- Some literature:
  - Liberalism and Social Action, 1935
  - Democracy and Education

=== Friedrich Naumann ===
Friedrich Naumann (Germany, 1860–1919)

=== Santeri Alkio ===
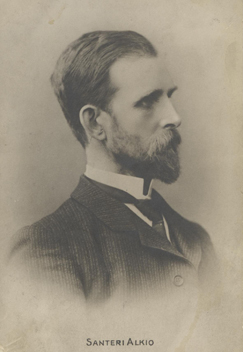
Santeri Alkio

Santeri Alkio (Finland, 1862–1930)

=== Max Weber ===
Max Weber (Germany, 1864–1920) was a theorist of state power and the relationship of culture to economics. Argued that there was a moral component to capitalism rooted in "Protestant" values. Weber was along with Friedrich Naumann active in the National Social Union and later in the German Democratic Party.

- Some literature:
  - Die protestantische Ethik und der 'Geist' des Kapitalismus, 1904 (The Protestant Ethic and the Spirit of Capitalism

=== Leonard Hobhouse ===
Leonard Trelawny Hobhouse (United Kingdom, 1864–1929)

- Some literature:
  - Liberalism, 1911

=== Benedetto Croce ===
Benedetto Croce (Italy, 1866–1952)

- Some literature:
  - Che cosa è il liberalismo, 1943

=== Walther Rathenau ===
Walther Rathenau (Germany, 1867–1922)

=== Sir Leo Chiozza Money ===
Leo Chiozza Money (Britain, 1870–1944) An Italian-born economic theorist who moved to Britain in the 1890s, where he made his name as a politician, journalist and author. In the early years of the 20th century his views attracted the interest of two future Prime Ministers, David Lloyd George and Winston Churchill. After a spell as Lloyd George's parliamentary private secretary, he was a Government minister in the latter stages of the First World War.

=== Ahmed Lutfi el-Sayed ===
Ahmed Lutfi el-Sayed Pasha (Egypt, 1872–1963) An Egyptian intellectual, anti-colonial activist and the first director of Cairo University. He was an influential person in the Egyptian nationalist movement and used his position in the media to strive and gain an independent Egypt from British rule. He was also one of the architects of modern Egyptian nationalism as well as the architect of Egyptian secularism and liberalism. He was fondly known as the "Professor of the Generation". Lutfi was one of the fiercest opponents of pan-Arabism, insisting that Egyptians are Egyptians and not Arabs. He is considered one of the most influential scholars and intellectuals in the history of Egypt.

=== William Beveridge ===
William Beveridge (United Kingdom, 1879–1963)

- Some literature:
  - Full Employment in a Free Society, 1944
  - Why I am a liberal, 1945

=== Ludwig von Mises ===
Ludwig von Mises (Austria/United States, 1881–1973)

- Some literature:
  - Socialism, 1922
  - Liberalism, 1927
  - Omnipotent Government, 1944
  - Human Action, 1949

=== José Ortega y Gasset ===
José Ortega y Gasset (Spain, 1883–1955)

- Some literature:
  - La rebelión de las masas (The Rebellion of the Masses), 1930

=== Salvador de Madariaga ===
Salvador de Madariaga (Spain, 1886–1978). One of the principal authors of the Oxford Manifesto in 1947.

=== Adolf Berle ===
Adolf Berle (United States, 1895–1971) was author of The Modern Corporation and Private Property, detailing the importance of differentiating between the management of corporations and the share holders who are the owners. Influential in the theory of New Deal policy.

- Some literature with Gardiner Means:
  - The Modern Corporation and Private Property

=== Wilhelm Röpke ===
Wilhelm Röpke (Germany, 1899–1966)

- Some literature:
  - International Economic Disintegration, 1942
  - The Social Crisis of Our Time, 1942
  - Civitas Humana, 1944
  - International Order and Economic Integration, 1945
  - The Solution of the German Problem, 1946

=== Bertil Ohlin ===
Bertil Ohlin (Sweden, 1899–1979)

- Some literature:
  - Interregional and International Trade, 1933

=== Friedrich von Hayek ===
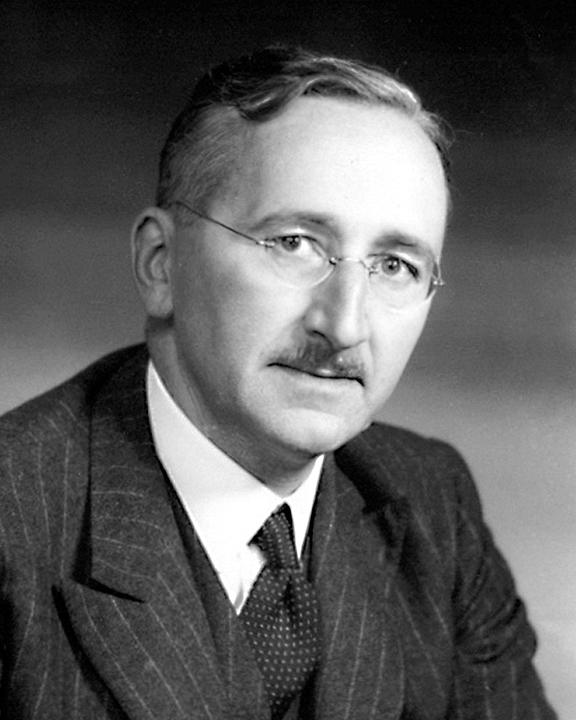
Friedrich von Hayek

Friedrich Hayek (Austria/United Kingdom/United States/Germany, 1899–1992) In Hayek's view, the central role of the state should be to maintain the rule of law, with as little arbitrary intervention as possible. Also a Nobel Prize winner in economics and predictor of the Great Depression like fellow Austrian School economist and mentor Ludwig von Mises.

- Some literature:
  - The Road to Serfdom, 1944
  - The Constitution of Liberty, 1960
  - Law, Legislation and Liberty, in three volumes, 1973, 1976 and 1979

=== Karl Popper ===
Karl Raimund Popper (Austria/United Kingdom, 1902–1994) developed the idea of the open society, characterized by respect for a wide variety of opinions and behaviors and a preference for audacious but piecemeal political reform over either conservative stasis or revolutionary utopianism. In his view, all simplistic and grandiose theories of history and society shared a common feature he called historicism, which he traces back to Plato, while the open society mirrors the methodological fallibilism pioneered by Popper in his earlier works on philosophy of science.

- Some literature:
  - The Open Society and Its Enemies, 1945
  - The Poverty of Historicism, 1961

=== Alan Paton ===
Alan Paton (South Africa, 1903–1988) contributed with his book Cry, The Beloved Country to a clear anti-apartheid stand of South African liberalism. His party, the Liberal Party of South Africa was banned by the apartheid government.

- Some literature:
  - Cry, The Beloved Country, 1948
  - Ah, but Your Land is Beautiful, 1983

=== Ayn Rand ===
Ayn Rand (United States, 1905–1982) was a radical and influential moral and political philosopher. Her advocacy of strong self-interest in ethics was influenced, she claimed, by the thinkers Aristotle, Aquinas, and Locke. Her advocacy of pure laissez-faire capitalism was influenced by the classical liberal economists Mises and Hayek.

- Some literature:
  - The Virtue of Selfishness, 1963
  - Capitalism: The Unknown Ideal, 1966

=== Raymond Aron ===
Raymond Aron (France, 1905–1983)

- Some literature:
  - Essais sur les libertés, 1965
  - Démocratie et totalitarisme, 1965

=== Donald Barkly Molteno ===
Donald Barkly Molteno (South Africa, 1908–1972), known as Dilizintaba ("He who removes mountains"), was a constitutional lawyer and a parliamentarian but above all, an academic. His work on constitutional law centered on civil rights and his fierce opposition to the segregationalist policies of Apartheid.

=== John Kenneth Galbraith ===
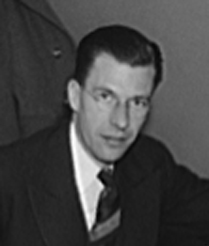
John Kenneth Galbraith

John Kenneth Galbraith (Canadian-born economist who worked in the United States, 1908–2006)

- Some literature:
  - The Affluent Society, 1958
  - The Liberal Hour, 1960

=== Isaiah Berlin ===
Isaiah Berlin (Latvia/United Kingdom, 1909–1997) is most famous for his attempt to distinguish 'two conceptions of liberty'. Berlin argued that what he called 'positive' and 'negative' liberty were mutually opposing concepts. Positive conceptions assumed that liberty could only be achieved when collective power (in the form of church or state) acted to 'liberate' mankind from its worst aspects. These, Berlin felt, tended towards totalitarianism. Negative conceptions, by contrast, argued that liberty was achieved when individuals were given maximal freedom from external constraints (so long as these did not infringe on the freedom of others to achieve the same condition). Berlin was also a critic of dogmatic Enlightenment rationalism on the grounds that it was unable to accommodate value pluralism.

- Some literature:
  - Two Concepts of Liberty, 1958
  - Four Essays on Liberty, 1969
  - From Hope and Fear Set Free, 1978

=== Milton Friedman ===
Milton Friedman (United States, 1912–2006), winner of a Nobel Prize in Economics and a self-identified Classical Liberal and libertarian, was known for the Friedman rule, Friedman's k-percent rule, and the Friedman test.

- Some literature:
  - Capitalism and Freedom, 1962
  - A Monetary History of the United States, 1963
  - Free to Choose, 1980

=== James Buchanan ===
James Buchanan (United States, 1919–2013) is known for his economic theories of the political process, which were among the first to take seriously the concept of politicians as rational actors that respond to incentives.

- Some literature:
  - The Calculus of Consent / James Buchanan & Gordon Tullock, 1962
  - The Limits of Liberty, 1975
  - Democracy in Deficit / James Buchanan & Richard E. Wagner, 1977
  - The Power to Tax / James Buchanan & Geoffrey Brennan, 1980
  - The Reason of Rules / James Buchanan & Geoffrey Brennan, 1985

=== John Rawls ===
John Rawls (United States, 1921–2002) One of the most influential political philosophers of the 20th century, largely responsible for the rebirth of normative political philosophy. He argues for equal basic liberties, equality of opportunity, and facilitating the maximum benefit to the least advantaged members of society in any case where inequalities may occur. Rawls's argument for these principles of social justice uses a thought experiment called the "original position", in which people deliberately select what kind of society they would choose to live in if they did not know which social position they would personally occupy.

- Some Literature:
  - A Theory of Justice, 1971
  - Political Liberalism, 1993
  - Justice as Fairness: A Restatement, 2001

=== Leszek Kołakowski ===
Leszek Kołakowski (Poland, 1927–2009), philosopher and historian of ideas. He was a leading inspiration behind Poland's Solidarity movement.

- Some literature:
  - Jednostka i nieskończoność. Wolność i antynomie wolności w filozofii Spinozy (The Individual and the Infinite: Freedom and Antinomies of Freedom in Spinoza's Philosophy), 1958
  - Rozmowy z diabłem (US title: Conversations with the Devil / UK title: Talk of the Devil; reissued with The Key to Heaven under the title The Devil and Scripture, 1973)
  - Od Hume'a do Koła Wiedeńskiego (the 1st edition:The Alienation of Reason, then Positivist Philosophy from Hume to the Vienna Circle)

=== Ralf Dahrendorf ===
Ralf Dahrendorf (Germany/United Kingdom, 1929–2009)

- Some literature:
  - Die Chancen der Krise: über die Zukunft des Liberalismus, 1983
  - Fragmente eines neuen Liberalismus, 1987

=== Karl-Hermann Flach ===
The journalist Karl-Hermann Flach (Germany, 1929–1973) was in his book Noch eine Chance für die Liberalen one of the main theorist of the new social liberal principles of the Free Democratic Party (Germany). He places liberalism clearly as the opposite of conservatism and opened the road for a government coalition with the social democrats.

=== Joseph Raz ===
Joseph Raz (Israel/United Kingdom, 1939–2022)

- Some literature:
  - The Morality of Freedom

=== Ronald Dworkin ===
Ronald Dworkin (United States, 1931–2013)

- Some literature:
  - Sovereign Virtue: The Theory and Practice of Equality
  - Justice for Hedgehogs

=== Bryan Magee ===
The British philosopher, broadcaster, and politician Bryan Magee (1930-2019) wrote some books of political philosophy. Although he was a member of the Labour Party and then the Social Democrats, he wrote in his autobiography that he considered himself a liberal. He saw his book The New Radicalism as an attempt to convert the Labour Party to a tradition of radical liberalism, in which he included Karl Popper. He later followed this with The Democratic Revolution, which was very critical of Communism in Eastern Europe.

=== Richard Rorty ===
Richard Rorty (United States, 1931–2007) was one of the leading contemporary philosophers of liberalism. His fundamental claims, among others, are that liberalism is best defined as the attempt to avoid cruelty to others; that liberals need to accept the historical 'irony' that there is no metaphysical justification for their belief that not being cruel is a virtue; that literature plays a crucial role in developing the empathy necessary to promote solidarity (and therefore lack of cruelty) between humans; and that private philosophising and public political discourse are separate practices and should remain so.

=== Amartya Sen ===
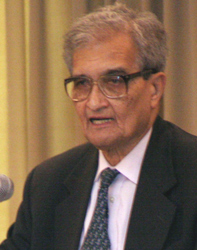
Amartya Sen

Amartya Sen (India, 1933–) is an economist whose early work was based on Kenneth Arrow's General Possibility Theorem, and on the impossibility of both complete pareto optimality and solely procedural based rights. He won the Nobel Memorial Prize in Economic Sciences for his work on famine, welfare economics and social choice theory. And is an advocate of rationality as the fundamental safe guard of freedom and justice.

- Some literature:
  - Development as Freedom
  - The Argumentative Indian

=== Robert Nozick ===
Robert Nozick (United States, 1938–2002) was a libertarian (or minarchist). He advocated an unapologetically reductionist political philosophy characterized by meticulous analysis of the moral aspects of each social interaction, and did not shy away from addressing hard philosophical issues such as the original appropriation of property. Nozick is best known for providing the justification of a minimal state by showing that it can be established without any unjust steps.

- Some literature:
  - Anarchy, State, and Utopia, 1974

=== Hernando de Soto ===
The economist Hernando de Soto (Peru, 1941–) is an advocate of transparency and private property rights, arguing that intransparent government leads to property not being given proper title, and therefore being "dead capital" which cannot be used as the basis of credit. Argues that laws which allocate property to those most able to use them for economic growth, so called "squatter's rights", are an important innovation.

- Some literature:
  - The Other Path, 1986.
  - The Mystery of Capital, 2000.

=== José Guilherme Merquior ===
José Guilherme Merquior was a Brazilian philosopher and sociologist

- Liberalism, Old and New, 1991

=== Michael Meadowcroft ===
A biography described the British politician Michael Meadowcroft as "the main, indeed very nearly the only, philosopher of applied Liberalism within the old Liberal Party from the late 1960s onwards". On the merger of the Liberal Party and the Social Democratic Party in the UK to form the Liberal Democrats, Meadowcroft initially reconstituted a new Liberal Party with others who did not want to compromise the philosophy of liberalism. However, the new Liberal Party became increasingly Eurosceptic under the leadership of Steve Radford and Meadowcroft joined the Liberal Democrats in 2007. He has regularly argued for the importance of political philosophy and that members of the Liberal Democrats require more conviction in their beliefs.

- Some literature:
  - Meadowcroft, Michael (1979). Liberal values for a new decade. Liberal Publication Department.
  - Meadowcroft, Michael; Marquand, David (1981). Liberalism and social democracy. London: Liberal Publication Department.
  - Meadowcroft, Michael (1997). Focus on freedom: the case for the Liberal Party (1 ed.). Southport: Liberal Party.
  - Meadowcroft, Michael (2001). Focus on freedom: the case for the Liberal Party (PDF) (2 ed.). Southport: Liberal Party. ISBN 189841509-9.
  - Meadowcroft, Michael (2001). New democracies : underpinned or undermined. John Stuart Mill Institute.
  - Meadowcroft, Michael (2009). Diversity in danger : pluralism and policy development. Leeds: Beecroft Publications.

=== Carlos Santiago Nino ===
Carlos Santiago Nino (Argentina, 1943–1993)

- Some literature:
  - The Ethics of Human Rights

=== Bruce Ackerman ===
Bruce Ackerman (United States, 1943–)

- Some literature:
  - We, The People

=== Martha Nussbaum ===
Martha Nussbaum (United States, 1947–) is a philosopher and the current Ernst Freund Distinguished Service Professor of Law and Ethics at the University of Chicago. She specializes in ancient Greek and Roman philosophy, political philosophy, existentialism, feminism, and ethics, including animal rights. She received the 2016 Kyoto Prize in Arts and Philosophy, the 2018 Berggruen Prize, and the 2021 Holberg Prize.

- Some literature:
  - The Fragility of Goodness (1986)
  - Cultivating Humanity: A Classical Defense of Reform in Liberal Education (1997)
  - Sex and Social Justice (1998)
  - Hiding from Humanity: Disgust, Shame, and the Law (2004)
  - Frontiers of Justice: Disability, Nationality, Species Membership (2006)
  - From Disgust to Humanity: Sexual Orientation and Constitutional Law (2010)

=== Will Kymlicka ===
Will Kymlicka (Canada, 1962–) tries in his philosophy to determine if forms of ethnic or minority nationalism are compatible with liberal-democratic principles of individual freedom, social equality and political democracy. In his book Multicultural Citizenship. A Liberal Theory of Minority Rights he argues that certain "group-differentiated rights" of minority cultures can be consistent with these liberal-democratic principles.
