= The Liberty of Ancients Compared with that of Moderns =

1819 philosophical work by Benjamin Constant

"The Liberty of Ancients Compared with that of Moderns" is an essay by Benjamin Constant, which is a transcript of a speech of the same name made at the Royal Athenaeum of Paris in 1819. In the essay, Constant discusses two different conceptions of freedom: One held by "the Ancients", particularly by those in Classical Greece; the other held by members of modern societies. The essay has been highly influential, having been among others cited by Isaiah Berlin as an inspiration for much of his work.

== Freedom among the Ancients ==
For Constant, freedom in the sense of the Ancients "consisted of the active and constant participation in the collective power" and consisted in "exercising, collectively, but directly, several parts of the whole sovereignty" and, except in Athens, they thought that this vision of liberty was compatible with "the complete subjection of the individual to the authority of the whole". Thus, at that time and outside the particular case of Athens, power was entitled to everything and therefore to the mores of society. Constant takes the example of Terpander, who in the time of Sparta was condemned by the Ephors for having added a string to his lyre without warning them; or the principle of ostracism in Athens showing that the state regulates everything.

Freedom is therefore contradictory in ancient Greece, because sovereignty in public affairs coexists with slavery in the private sphere. "As a citizen, he decides on peace and war; as particular, he is circumscribed, observed, repressed in all his movements". Constant explains that the ancients had no notion of individual rights, except in Athens, which, Constant tells us, "is [of all the ancient states] the one who has resembled the modern ones" and that it granted "to its citizens infinitely more individual freedom than Rome and Sparta". This type of freedom is explained by the small size of the republics of the time. The rivalry between the cities causes the states to buy their security at the price of war.

== Freedom among the Moderns ==
Freedom in modern societies is incompatible with that of the ancients. This is the opportunity to do what we want, it is a protection of the private sphere. "The aim of the moderns is the enjoyment of security in private pleasures; and they call liberty the guarantees accorded by institutions to these pleasures". Size and trade explain it. The sharing of power diminishes with increasing size of states. The war has given way to trade. They are only two means to achieve the same goal, namely to possess what you want. Trade is "an attempt to obtain by mutual agreement what one no longer hopes to conquer by violence." War, just like trade, makes it possible to achieve a goal, and the evolution of society has changed the means without touching the end. "Trade inspires men with a keen love of individual independence." Thus Athens, which was the most commercial democracy, was also the one which bestowed the most individual liberty. However, we must moderate this idea with the practice of ostracism, symbol of the power of the state over the individual.

The errors of the French Revolution were the result of an attempt to apply ancient liberty in a modern world. Constant criticizes Father Gabriel Bonnot de Mably, who, he says, regrets that the law only reaches actions and not thought. He explains the admiration of the author for Sparta. He also criticizes the beliefs of Jean-Jacques Rousseau.

== Conclusions ==
He draws from his reflection a number of political principles:

- Individual independence is the first of modern needs.
- One must never sacrifice individual liberty to obtain political freedom.
- The institutions of the ancient republics, hindering individual liberty, are not admissible in modern societies.
- Individuals have rights that society must respect.
- We must not want to go back. "Since we are in modern times, I want freedom that is proper in modern times."
- Political freedom is the guarantee; political freedom is therefore indispensable.

The political system must be that of representation. Every person votes for their interests to be defended. They does not speak of the general will.

Since ancient liberty is not the same as modern liberty, it follows that they are respectively threatened with different dangers. The danger of ancient liberty rests on an alienation of the individual, in which the state crushes the individual. But the danger that threatens modern freedom is, as Tocqueville suggests, that the individual is too absorbed in the pursuit of their individual interests and renounces their rights to share political power (thus endangering their individual freedom, since is the political power that ensures its safeguarding and protection).

He concludes his speech by explaining the need to learn to combine these two types of freedom.
