= Antoine-Elisée Cherbuliez =

Swiss liberal thinker (1797–1869)

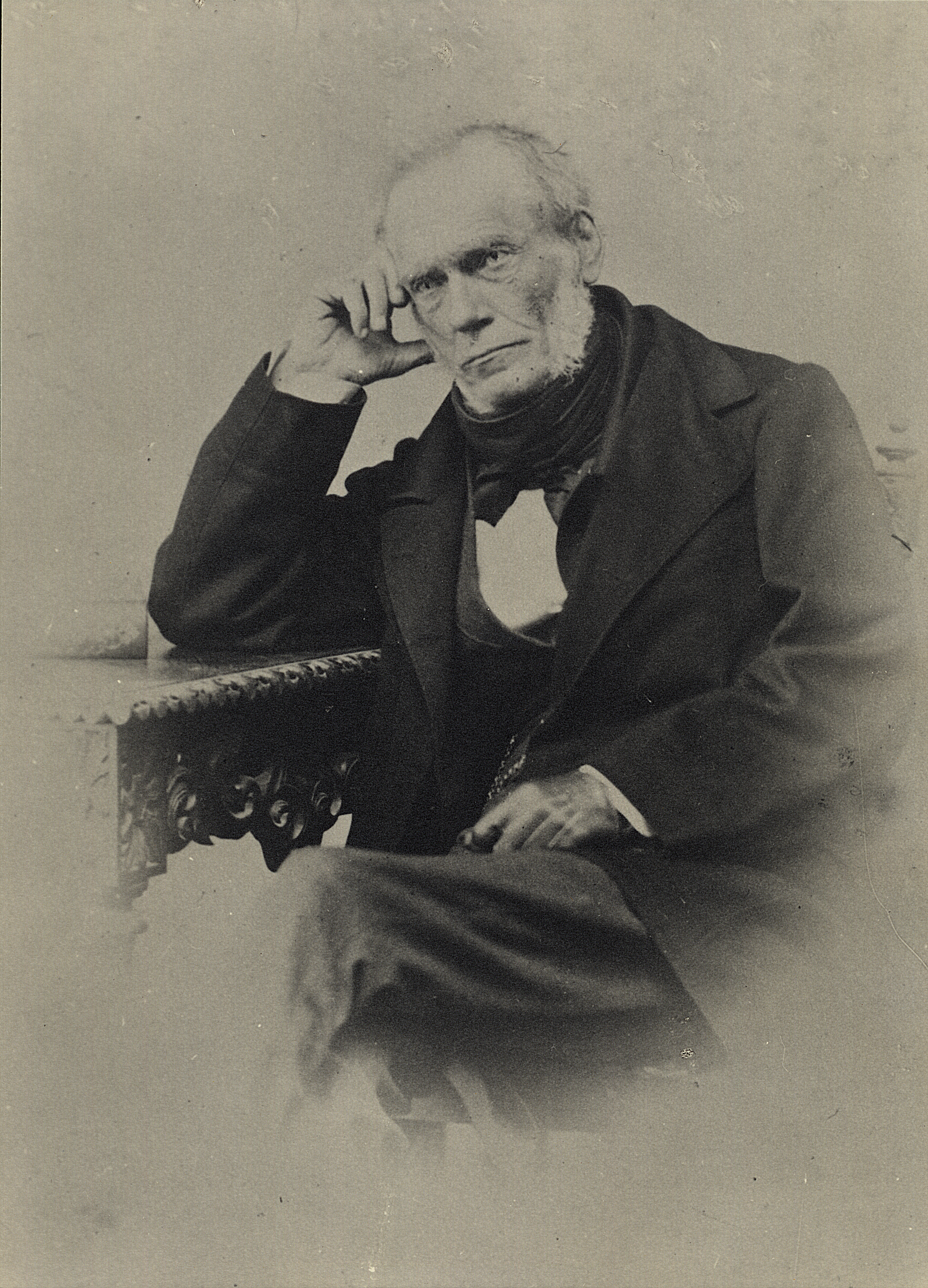
Antoine-Elisée Cherbuliez

Antoine-Elisée Cherbuliez (also Antoine Élisée Adolph Cherbuliez; 29 July 1797 in Geneva - 7 March 1869 in Zürich) was a Swiss liberal thinker.

My mission is to influence the world, he wrote in 1844. While his economic thought stimulated some responses, that is hardly the case for his political ideas, in effect stillborn. Unlike his compatriots Benjamin Constant and Jean de Sismondi, Cherbuliez has had little attention from contemporary historians. His thoughts were spread thinly over various publications, with no major work of synthesis. He was a retiring academic and somewhat isolated.

He was though granted recognition: member of the Académie des sciences morales et politiques of Institut de France, and holder of academic distinctions. Further, Karl Marx wrote a chapter on his place in the history of economic doctrine.

== Career ==
Born into a middle-class family, he studied at the Collège de Genève, then the École Polytechnique in Paris, and the theological faculty in Geneva. In 1819 he travelled to Germany, trying unsuccessfully to live by writing poetry and novels. He then took tutoring work, returning to Geneva in 1823. There he submitted a doctoral dissertation to the law faculty, on "the causes of positive law".

His career took off. He founded a journal arguing the utilitarian cause (1829). In 1835 he was nominated as professor of public law and political economy. Two books which gained a reputation were Théorie des garanties constitutionnelles of 1838, and Riche ou pauvre (1840).

Reacting to the Genevan revolution of 1841, he turned to conservative views. Elected to the 1842 Constituent Assembly, he was hostile to democratic reform, his views being expressed in the book De la démocratie en Suisse.

In 1848 he left politics and travelled to Paris, reacting with shock to the violent events there. Five years later he came back to Switzerland, and wrote a series of works with economic and social themes, among them Étude sur les causes de la misère, tant morale que physique et sur les moyens d'y porter remède (1853). They contained his theory of value, which was admired at the time.

== Selected works ==
- Antoine Élisée Cherbuliez (1841). Richesse ou pauvreté — Exposition des causes et des effets de la distribution actuelle des richesses sociales. Paris: A. Le Gallois.
