= Michel Auguste Dupoty =

French journalist and politician

Michel Auguste Dupoty (1797–1864) was a French journalist and a politician with republican beliefs. He took part in publishing several republican-democratic newspapers.
