= Half-pay =

Allowance paid to an inactive British military officer

Half-pay (h.p.) was a term used in the British Army and Royal Navy of the 18th, 19th and early 20th centuries to refer to the pay or allowance an officer received when in retirement or not in actual service.

== Past usage ==
=== United Kingdom ===
In the English Army the option of half-pay developed during the late 17th and early 18th centuries, at the same time as the system of purchasing commissions and promotions by officers took hold. Serving officers could go on half-pay voluntarily, or be obliged to do so if their services were not required. In both cases, they could be summoned back to their regiments if there was a sudden need for their services. As an example, during the Jacobite rising of 1715, all listed half-pay officers were recalled to the army.

During the long period of peace that the reduced British Army experienced after the Napoleonic Wars, the half-pay system became a means by which arduous overseas service could be avoided. Well-to-do officers who were promoted through the purchase system could transfer to the half-pay list if their regiment was posted to India or elsewhere. They could then purchase new appointments to regiments assigned to home service in Britain. Transfers to and from the half-pay list were approved at the discretion of the Secretary at War.

In the 19th century, armies and navies used the half-pay list, which served a similar function to the reserve officer components of modern forces, with officers who were retired or otherwise not required for active service receiving half of the salary of their fully commissioned counter-parts.

The half-pay list could also serve as a means of ridding the service of ineffective or incompetent officers who had too much political influence to be dismissed entirely. Such officers would be placed on half-pay and never recalled to active service. In periods of extended conflict, the half-pay lists became a significant expense for militaries when it was coupled with the selling of half pay-commissions, which was common in the British Army.

=== United States ===
The half-pay system was implemented in 1778 by the Continental Congress as an incentive to compensate for the extremely low pay that officers in the Continental Army received, which made it difficult to retain officers for long periods of time. The half-pay benefit was granted to all officers for seven years after the end of the American Revolutionary War but was later extended to a lifetime benefit. The benefit was promised to all officers serving in the Continental Army, but after the war the Congress of the Articles of Confederation voted against paying for those pensions and so only officers from certain state regiments, which had established an independent half-pay list, received that pay. After extended lobbying by retired officers after the war, Congress in 1783 authorized the full pay of officers for five years to be paid by the Department of War. Such a large list of officers drawing half-pay created similar problems for the United States as it had in Great Britain. In an attempt to control the growing number of aging officers still on the government payroll and to promote a younger officer corps, in 1855, the Secretary of the Navy was given the right, with the recommendation of a review board, to terminate involuntarily officers who were deemed incapable or unfit for duty. Soon, officers with 40 years of service were allowed to retire voluntarily.

In 1889, the half-pay retirement benefit was extended to enlisted personnel who had completed 30 years of active service by General Order No. 372.

=== France ===
Following the Second Bourbon Restoration in 1815, the remnants of the Grande Armée were disbanded; because of wholesale defection to Napoleon upon his return from Elba, the end of the various Coalition Wars since 1792 and the precarious situation of public finances. Many of the officers were deemed suspect of Bonapartism or Republicanism and so were thought to be unreliable. Consequently, many of the pre-Waterloo officers were put on demi-solde ("half-pay"), and some of these were replaced by émigrés.

These officers were removed from active service but still retained their ranks and had to be ready to serve the military at any time. Their perceived political unreliability caused them to continue to be under the burdens of military discipline. They had to ask for permission to marry or to travel outside their commune (municipality). Also, their mail was opened, and they had to report to police.

The image of the demi-solde as a nostalgic Bonapartist organising conspiracies for the return of his Emperor is an exaggeration, but some of them were actually involved in anti-Bourbon plots. On the other hand, most of the officers reintegrated into civil life by becoming farmers, industrialists or traders. Others were eventually recalled to the military when it needed to be expanded. Still others emigrated, mainly to the Americas.

From 20,000 in 1815, they numbered only 3000 by the July Revolution.

== Modern usage ==
In the modern US military, the term "half-pay" refers to the punishment of low-level offences by service members in the form of forfeiture of half of pay and entitlements. There is no specific punishment described as "half-pay" in the Uniform Code of Military Justice, but the term is used as a common shorthand for the forfeiture of pay. The guidelines for the maximum length of time of this punishment are defined by Article 15 of the Uniform Code of Military Justice. For commissioned officers, the length of forfeiture cannot exceed two months at half-pay or detention of half months pay for three months. For enlisted personnel, the severity of the available punishments is limited by the rank of the commanding officer and the rank. For example, to punish a noncommissioned officer for the same length of time as a junior enlisted service member, the commanding officer must be of a higher rank than would otherwise be required. Officers below the rank of O-4 (Major or Lieutenant Commander) may impose the confiscation of only up to seven days' pay. Officers of the rank of O-4 and above may impose the forfeiture of half-a-month's pay for two months or the detention of half-a-month's pay for three months.

The term may also be used in reference to the retirement pay that members of the US Armed Forces receive if they retire after 20 years of service. They are technically subject to recall to active service if needed and so the legal term retired pay (reduced pay for reduced service) is used instead of pension. The current retirement system was adopted after World War II to maintain competitiveness with the civilian market, maintain a pool of experienced officers and NCOs, to care for the large numbers of officers and senior enlisted personnel leaving the service after the end of the war.

== In fiction ==
The maritime adventure novels of the Horatio Hornblower series, set during the Napoleonic Wars, include numerous references to the fear of the protagonist and his fellow naval officers of being retired and "stranded ashore on half-pay", which they consider as their worst nightmare because even full pay was often barely sufficient to cover the living expenses of an officer and any dependents. In addition to the permanent retirement of individuals, peacetime cutbacks in the wartime establishments of the army and the navy could mean significant numbers of serving officers being placed on half-pay and awaiting new appointments, which might not occur.
