= Charles Jeanne =

Leader of the Parisian June Rebellion

Charles Jeanne (15 May 1800 – 11 July 1837) was one of the leaders of the Parisian June Rebellion in 1832. He died of tuberculosis in 1837.

His memoir À cinq heures nous serons tous morts (At five o'clock we will all be dead) helped to inspire Victor Hugo and the barricade scenes in Les Misérables.

== Early life ==
Charles Jeanne was born on May 15, 1800, in Paris, France. His father was a store clerk and he helped with his father's business. He attended school in Caen, but had to stop at age 14 due to financial and family issues. He was involved for a year in the French army and worked as a clerk.

== 1830 Rebellion ==
Charles Jeanne participated in the Trois Glorieuses, and was injured in action. King Louis Philippe I gave him a medal for bravery.
