= Antoine Richard du Cantal =

French doctor (1802–1891)

Antoine Richard "du Cantal"
- Born: 4 February 1802; Pierrefort, Cantal, France
- Died: 10 February 1891 (aged 89); Paris, France
- Occupation: Politician

Antoine Richard "du Cantal" (4 February 1802 – 10 February 1891) was a French medical doctor, veterinarian, agronomist and politician.

== Early years ==
Antoine Richard was born in Pierrefort, Cantal, on 4 February 1802. He enlisted as a volunteer in the 1st Cuirassiers of the Guard and was sent to the École nationale vétérinaire d'Alfort (National Veterinary School of Alfort) as a military student. In 1828 he was admitted as a veterinarian to the 1st Artillery. He was stationed in Strasbourg, where he attended the Faculty of Medicine and obtained a degree as a doctor. He went to Algeria, then returned to Grignon to teach rural economy.

From 1832 Richard was a member of the Republican Society of the Rights of Man (Société des droits de l'homme). In 1838 he founded an agricultural school in the Auvergne. In 1840 he was appointed professor of natural history at the royal school of stud farming, and in 1844 he was made director of the school. In 1845 he published the Annals of stud farming and agriculture, a monthly review. In 1847 he published a remarkable work on equine conformation. His scientific doctrines and democratic leanings made him suspect by the government, and he was dismissed in 1847.

== Second republic ==
Richard threw himself into the Reform movement. After the February Revolution he was sent to Saint-Flour as Deputy Commissioner of the Provisional Government. On 23 April 1848 he was elected to represent Cantal in the Constituent Assembly. He joined the moderate left. During the government of General Louis-Eugène Cavaignac (28 June 1848 to 20 December 1848) he was rapporteur of the agriculture and farm credit committee of the Assembly. This committee reviewed the proposal by Agriculture Minister Charles Gilbert Tourret for agricultural education. The committee proposed various amendments. Richard noted that cultivators had long been neglected by previous regimes, and presented the project as a great revolutionary measure. Richard added the objective of instilling love of the Republic to that of instilling love of the land.

Richard was re-elected for Cantal in the Legislative Assembly on 13 May 1849, sitting with the Democratic minority.

== Later career ==
After the coup d'état of 2 December 1851 Richard returned to private life. For the duration of the Second French Empire (1852–1870) he devoted himself to the study of agronomy. In 1854 he and Isidore Geoffroy Saint-Hilaire founded the Zoological Society of Acclimatization. On 1 June 1863 he ran unsuccessfully as an independent candidate for election to the second district of Cantal. In 1869 he was supported by the government in giving popular science lectures throughout France, which were very popular. He died in Paris on 10 February 1891. He was aged 89.

== Works ==
Robert's published works include:

- Antoine Richard (1847). De la conformation du cheval suivant les lois de la physiologie et de la mécanique. Impr. Guiraudet et Jouaust.
- Antoine Richard (1848). Rapport fait à l'Assemblée nationale constituante le 21 août 1848 au nom de son Comité d'agriculture et de crédit foncier: sur le projet de décret relatif à l'organisation de l'enseignement de l'agriculture en France. Librairie Hachette.
- Antoine Richard (1850). Principes généraux sur l'amélioration des races de chevaux et autres animaux domestiques, à l'usage des écoles d'agriculture et de l'armée, par A. Richard (du Cantal)... au Comptoir des Imprimeurs-unis.
- Anselme Payen; Antoine Richard (1851). Précis d'agriculture theórique et pratique: a l'usage des écoles d'agriculture, des propriétaires et des fermiers. Hachette.
- Antoine Richard (1854). Dictionnaire raisonné d'agriculture et d'économie du betail suivant les principes des sciences naturelles appliquées ... Société des Gens.
- Antoine Richard (1859). Etude du cheval de service et de guerre suivant les principes élémentaires des sciences naturelles. Hachette.
- Antoine Richard (1883). Vocabulaire agricole et horticole à l'usage des élèves des collèges et des écoles primaires ... Hachette.
