= Society of the Rights of Man =

Society of the Rights of Man Société des droits de l'homme
- Leader: Various
- Founded: 1830 (as Society of the Friends of the People); 1832 (as Society of the Rights of Man)
- Dissolved: 1834
- Headquarters: Paris and Lyon
- Newspaper: La Tribune des départements
- Membership (1830): 4,000 (Paris)
- Ideology: Republicanism; Jacobinism; Populism
- Political position: Left-wing
- Slogan: Liberté, égalité, fraternité

The Society of the Rights of Man (French: Société des droits de l'homme, SDH) was a French republican association with Jacobin roots, formed during the July Revolution in 1830, replacing another republican association, the Society of the Friends of the People.

It played a major role in the June riots of 1832 in Paris and the July Monarchy.

== Origins ==
The origins of the Society had its foundations on a previous organization, the Society of the Friends of the People (French: Société des Amis du Peuple; 1830–1832). This organization was founded in a meeting that took place on July 30. It created the first draft of the Society's manifesto and coincided with the publication of the famous Proclamation du duc d'Orléans by Adolphe Thiers. After a failed attempt to discuss their grievances with their municipality, the Society of Friends of the People published their manifesto in the republican newspaper The Tribune of the Departments (French: La Tribune des departments).

Following the publication of their manifesto, they continued their activity, protesting the crowning of Louis Philippe I. Originally 120 members, the Society began to gain traction, eventually reaching more than 300. Admission relied on either notoriety or on declarations of patriotism. Speeches given would draw in a reasonable crowd; Claude cites around 1500. However, mirroring the events of the French Revolution it lacked working-class men. It was officially dissolved in December 1832. Most of the big names like Blanqui, Ulysse Trélat and other known politicians were all acquitted.

== Organization ==
The SDH was modelled on another secret society, the Carbonari, organised in small groups of less than twenty members, each given names that evoked Jacobin tradition: 'Robespierre', 'Marat', 'Babeuf', 'Louvel', 'Blackjack January', 'War with the castles', 'Washington', etc. They were a nationwide organisation, consisting of group sizes of between 10 and less than 20 members. This allowed them to circumvent the law which required a permit for groups of more than 20 members (this law was amended in February 1834). They were the first organisation to extend its educational activities to the working class.

In Paris, there were 170 groups with a total of approximately 3,000 members. Its network extended into the province and would account, according to the police reports, approximately 4 000 members.

The official publication of the organisation was La Tribune des départements published by Armand Marrast. It published very revolutionary articles, often insulting the King Louis-Philippe and its government.

== Members and principles ==
The management committee of the SDH was made up of representatives of the extreme left like Audry de Puyraveau or Voyer d' Argenson, and of young republican militants such as Éléonore-Louis Godefroi Cavaignac, Joseph Sobrier or Joseph Guinard. Moderates included Antoine Richard du Cantal, the German writer Georg Büchner (author of Woyzeck, amongst other works), although this is not proven.

But soon the radical elements gained the upper hand and published a manifesto on "Société des droits de l'homme" in the journal La Tribune on October 22, 1833, demanding a return to a government along Jacobin principles: strict secularity; economic and educational leadership of the state, strict limitation of private property; nationalization and planning of the economy; etc. And insurrection and revolution were the way to achieve this goal.

In 1834, Jacques-Charles Dupont de l'Eure, a lawyer and member of the Society, associated the three famous terms "Liberté, égalité, fraternité" together and published it in the Revue Républicaine which he edited: "Any man aspires to liberty, to equality, but he can not achieve it without the assistance of other men, without fraternity."

== Activities ==
During the funeral of General Lamarque riots broke out on June 5–6, 1832, organised by the Society. These were brutally put down by the police. Further riots followed in Paris and Lyon in 1834. In April 1834, there were serious disturbances that broke out in Paris following the passing of a law to curtail the activities of the Republican Society of Human Rights (changing the allowed group sizes) which spread to Lyon. The disturbances were brutally put down by the army. It took 13,000 police and 4 days of fighting to put down the riot. All people living in an apartment block in the Rue Transnonain from where shots had been fired were massacred.

This event was "caricatured" by the journal La Caricature under its editor Charles Philipon, specifically in a lithograph by its prized satirical draughtsman Honoré Daumier, entitled Rue Transnonain, le 15 Avril 1834. According to a slightly different account, the lithograph was designed for the subscription publication L'Association Mensuelle. The profits were to promote freedom of the press and defrayed legal costs of a lawsuit against the satirical, politically progressive journal Le Charivari to which Daumier contributed regularly. The police discovered the print hanging in the window of printseller Ernest Jean Aubert in the Galerie Véro-Dodat (a passageway in 1st arrondissement) and subsequently tracked down and confiscated as many of the prints they could find, along with the original lithographic stone on which the image was drawn. The surviving prints are from this effort.

On July 28, 1835, a Corsican member of the Society Giuseppe Marco Fieschi, together with two compatriots, attempted to assassinate King Louis Philippe I using an "infernal machine" consisting of 20 gun-barrels bound and detonated together. Although 17 people died, the King survived. Fieschi himself was injured, captured, then nursed back to health, only to be sentenced and subsequently guillotined.

== Notable members ==
- Antoine Richard du Cantal
- Audry de Puyraveau
- Voyer d' Argenson
- Godefroy Cavaignac
- Joseph Sobrier
- Joseph Guinard
- Antoine Richard du Cantal
- Georg Büchner

== See also ==
- Friends of the ABC, fictional representation of the Society in the 1862 Victor Hugo novel Les Misérables
