= Outline of republicanism in France =

Overview of topics related to republicanism in France

The following outline is provided as an overview of and topical guide to republicanism in France.

In France, republicanism is the political tradition that regards a republic based on popular sovereignty and equality of citizens as the legitimate form of government of the French nation. In its modern form, French republicanism is associated with the motto 'liberty, equality, fraternity' (Liberté, égalité, fraternité) and the principles of the indivisibility of the Republic and French secularism (laïcité). Its roots lie in the Enlightenment and the French Revolution, during which the First Republic was established in 1792. For much of the 19th century, republicans struggled against monarchist and Bonapartist movements and regimes. Republican government became consolidated under the Third Republic (proclaimed in 1870, with its constitutional framework established in 1875). France has had five republican regimes, the current Fifth Republic having been established in 1958.

== Modern politics ==
By the 20th century, republicanism had become a shared commitment across much of French politics. Accusations of being anti-republican were used to discredit political opponents: moderates directed them against the French Communist Party, the left against the Gaullists, and both left and right against the National Front from the 1990s.

French law distinguishes judicial from administrative dissolution of associations. Under the 1901 association law, a court can order dissolution on the grounds specified in article 3. Administrative dissolution was provided for by the law of 10 January 1936. Article L212-1 of the Internal Security Code now provides for dissolution by decree in the Council of Ministers on specified grounds. These include incitement to violence, organisation as a private militia, and attempts to attack the republican form of government by force.

Yves Mény describes republicanism as a shared ideology whose opponents risk exclusion from political life.

== Intellectual roots of the republican tradition ==
French Republican doctrine puts together its own list of precursors over time, what Claude Nicolet calls a "republican patrology". The list took more or less final shape in 1924, when Lucien Lévy-Bruhl set out the "republican ideal" for the Cartel des Gauches: he traced it back to the Greek city, skipped the Middle Ages almost entirely, and picked the story up again with the Enlightenment. Nicolet notes that what such a canon includes and leaves out is "rarely innocent and always significant".

- Antiquity – the problem of the liberty of the ancients versus that of the moderns ran through French political thought from Constant to Laboulaye and beyond. This identification remained influential in 1942: in Les Oligarques, Jules Isaac presented democratic Athens as a model in which defeated republican France could recognise itself.
- The Reformation – in Nicolet's account, the usual association between Protestantism and liberty belongs to liberal rather than republican thought. From about 1880 the republican mainstream went for full laïcité, although several of the men running that fight came from Protestant backgrounds (Ferdinand Buisson, Jules Steeg, Félix Pécaut). Earlier, under the Second Empire, admirers of the Reformation had been common among republicans; Edgar Quinet told Buisson that the reformers were "not enemies, but ancestors".
- Cartesianism – plays a surprisingly small part in the canon. Jules Simon is one of the few republicans who cited Descartes by name, on the point that individual reason judges every authority. His formula: "Descartes is not a republican, but one cannot be a republican without Descartes".
- The Enlightenment – everyone agreed this was where the republican spirit really came from, but the inheritance was awkward to handle. Most of the major philosophes invoked by later republicans had died before the Revolution, their ideas got along fine with enlightened despotism, and Aulard showed that none of the major pre-revolutionary writers actually called for a republic.
  - Montesquieu – Condorcet and later Destutt de Tracy criticised his work, whereas Restoration monarchists and liberals such as Tocqueville and Laboulaye adopted his ideas. The republicans of 1848 and the Second Empire barely cited him at all. Things changed after 1875, when there was finally a republican constitution whose separation of powers jurists could argue about; Montesquieu also came back separately, through Comte and Durkheim, as a forerunner of sociology.
  - Voltaire – faded badly between 1800 and 1815, and the romantic republicans had little use for him either. The positivist 1860s brought him back as the standard-bearer of free thought, and the failed centenary celebration of 1878 made him a rallying point in the anticlerical fight. Gambetta said at the time: "I feel free enough in spirit to be the devotee of Joan of Lorraine and the admirer and disciple of Voltaire". The opportunist and radical republics stayed broadly Voltairean in temper, but republican legal writers never cited him.
  - Rousseau – "the great affair of the republicans". Nobody could avoid him and nobody could agree about him. He was read as the theorist of popular sovereignty and direct democracy; liberals from Mme de Staël and Constant on blamed him for the Terror; Comte's typology filed him under the "metaphysical" spirit. Jaurès still concluded that "Rousseau was republican".
  - Mably – probably the most openly republican writer of the century, as Nicolet reads him, yet the nineteenth-century republicans hardly noticed him. In 1848 his critics made him out to be a precursor of communism, and Marx and Engels later treated him as a precursor of socialism. Only around 1900 did jurists, Esmein especially, point out that he was the one writer who had actually predicted a revolution.
  - Condorcet – unlike the others, he lived the Revolution and chose the Republic. Republicans mentioned Condorcet only occasionally for much of the century. His real entry into the republican pantheon came with Ferry, who from the Salle Molière speech of 1870 onward openly placed his school program in the line of Condorcet's plan for public instruction, and then with the wave of studies of 1901–1906. From then on the Radicals appropriated his image.

== Place in French politics ==
In France the word république has never been a neutral constitutional label. From the Revolution onward it carried a judgement of value. For more than a century, the term identified one side in conflicts over France's form of government. Dorothy Pickles described the resulting tradition not as a body of doctrine but as a set of beliefs and emotions about the proper relationship between state and citizen and between government and legislature, held all the more firmly because the French had repeatedly had to fight for them. Two overlapping versions of the republican idea grew out of that fight, one on the left and, later, one on the right, although the line between the two has never been clear or consistent.

- Republic as a value – the men of 1789 did not intend to copy Athens or the United States and first built a constitutional monarchy; when the counter-revolution tied itself to the throne, supporters of the Revolution turned to the republic in 1792. Chénier's Chant du départ already contrasted free republicans to monarchical "slaves".
- Republic as a symbol – the vocabulary of the tradition ("the Republic, one and indivisible", "the sacred right of insurrection", "the rights of man and the citizen", "popular sovereignty", "a secular, democratic and social Republic") works as a political shorthand for episodes of French history and has become the symbolism of a mystique; every Frenchman's Republic has a special meaning for him, but it is not always the same Republic.
- Laïcité – developed through the republic's conflicts with the Catholic Church and eventually became a constitutional principle. Republican governments made the secular school one of its chief instruments, while the separation of churches and state in 1905 established a different settlement based on state neutrality toward religion. By the late 20th century, debates over immigration, Islam and the public expression of religious identity had made laïcité one of the central contested meanings of republicanism.
- Constitutional instability – writing in the 1960s, Pickles noted that the often-cited average of a new constitution every twelve years concealed large differences in duration. She contrasted the 21 days of the Acte additionnel with the 65 years of the Third Republic's constitutional framework, and warned that the calculation depended on which constitutions and provisional regimes were counted. She identified three cycles beginning in 1791, 1815 and 1875. In the first two, constitutional monarchy gave way to a republic and then dictatorship. The third began with a republic whose constitutional laws left room for a possible monarchical restoration; it ended in the dictatorship of Vichy. Pickles drew on Maurice Duverger's analysis but noted that he did not recognise a third cycle beginning in 1875. She argued that successive regimes remained vulnerable to attempts to overthrow them.
- Left republicanism – through the 19th century and much of the 20th, a "good republican" was expected to hold more than an anti-monarchical position: attachment to the Revolution, to the nation, to the common people who had supplied the movement's street fighters in Paris and Lyon, to laïcité and suspicion of the Catholic clergy, and to the primacy of elected assemblies over the executive and over any dominant personality. Each requirement grew out of a historical experience (the Church backing the monarchy, generals and Bonapartes staging coups). This outlook became the core of the "republican tradition" and what has been called a "maximal definition" of the republic: the constitutional form plus the values that historically came with it, complete with a cult, rhetoric and a symbolic apparatus of its own. For most Socialists and some Radicals the belief that modern France dates from 1789 remained integral to republicanism; after the Boulanger affair Léon Bourgeois told royalists seeking a rapprochement that accepting the Republic was not enough, they had to accept the Revolution. For Socialists, commemorating the Commune at the Mur des Fédérés held the same importance as 14 July. Radicals instead emphasised anticlericalism and educational opportunity rather than economic equality. In institutional terms this wing leaned toward assembly government, and its memory was that the Directory led to Napoleon, the Second Republic to Louis-Napoléon and the Third to Pétain. In its late 20th-century form, left-wing (or liberal) republicanism shares with Anglo-American liberalism a foundational commitment to ethical universalism, based on the egalitarian philosophy of the Enlightenment and the heritage of 1789.
- Right republicanism – until 1848 the conservative camp associated the word with terror and irreligion. Liberals such as Tocqueville, who could accept neither legitimism, Orléanism nor Bonapartism, arrived by elimination at the idea of a lasting, American-style republic; Thiers made the same calculation succeed in 1871–1873, and his defection from Orléanism gave the left the support it needed to establish the regime. Alongside the founders' republic there developed a republic of ralliés (latecomers), reduced to a "minimal definition": the constitutional form without the accompanying revolutionary values. Right-wing republicans of unquestioned loyalty to the regime, such as presidents Doumergue, Poincaré and Coty, cared less about general principles than about techniques of government and the need for a strong executive, and tended to associate the left with a taste for weak government. Their historical memory ran the other way: the First Republic had turned into the Convention and the Terror, the Second was tied to socialism and the Third had been heralded by the Commune. External danger has repeatedly made this wing prone to acquiesce in extremism; war helped bring down the First and Third Republics and the Algerian rebellion the Fourth. In its late 20th-century form, right-wing republicanism generally combined communitarian nationalism with essentialist or historical claims about French national superiority. It emphasised cultural homogeneity and the alignment of political and cultural membership. What separates it from the far right of the National Front is its confidence that the nation can assimilate newcomers and its unambiguous acceptance of republican democratic traditions; Philippe Séguin's 1991 essay on the Republic and the exception française (French exceptionalism) is sometimes considered a representative statement.
- Common ground and blurred lines – Pickles singles out three tendencies shared across the tradition: insistence on the individual citizen and his fundamental freedoms, expressed in a taste for complex electoral systems and in the declarations of rights attached to the constitutions of 1791, 1793, 1795, 1848, 1946 and 1958; exaltation of the elected assembly over both the second chamber and the government, which on the left means assembly government and on the right a defence of the prestige of Parliament, both agreeing that Parliament votes the laws and the government executes them; and a "constitutional attitude" of rigidity born of instability, each new regime writing its constitution as a strait-jacket against the danger it had just survived, which in practice amounted to a plan for winning the last war. In practice, the dividing line shifted. Under the Fourth Republic, prime ministers Guy Mollet and Pierre Pflimlin sought a stronger executive. A presidential system also temporarily attracted supporters on the left, including Blum in 1946 and, later, Vedel and Duverger. Where majorities of the two wings reliably faced each other was on Catholic schools, the rights of Parliament, state control of the economy, social security and electoral law.
- Republicanism and cultural identity – from the 1980s the republican idea was reshaped by questions of cultural identity, national and sub-national. The headscarf affairs of 1989 and 1993 prompted left-wing republican intellectuals to recast the four ideals of liberté, égalité, fraternité and laïcité as an argument for keeping cultural identities outside the political sphere: liberty as rational autonomy from inherited attachments; equality as culture-blind treatment of individuals sans distinction d'origine, de race ou de religion; fraternity as a community of citizens joined by participation in self-government rather than by a common culture; and laïcité as neutrality toward religions and ascribed identities. Cécile Laborde reads this position as liberal universalism rather than nationalism, close to Rawlsian liberalism except in the importance it gives to the civic bond and to the school as part of the public sphere. It has been contested from the radical left and the Nouvelle Gauche, for whom culture-blind universalism either conceals existing domination (Farhad Khosrokhavar writes of the "specific violence of abstract universalism") or fails to recognise that demands for cultural recognition can also be demands for equality. Jennings, in the early 2000s, sorts the responses of the 1990s into three camps: a traditional republicanism (the Régis Debray of Que vive la République, Emmanuel Todd, Christian Jelen) that treats multiculturalism as a new tribalism and refuses concessions; a modernising republicanism, best represented by Schnapper's "community of citizens", which accepts cultural pluralism in private and social life but not as a political identity; and a multicultural republicanism, associated with Esprit, Joël Roman and the sociologists of CADIS (Alain Touraine, Michel Wieviorka, Khosrokhavar), which calls for a "tempered" or "plural universalism" and a républicanisme élargi.
- National turn – a parallel response to globalisation and European integration defended what Pierre-André Taguieff called the cultural identity of France. It encompassed the exception culturelle advanced in GATT negotiations and later renamed diversité culturelle; the promotion of francophonie; recognition of French as the language of the Republic under article 2 of the Constitution; and cautious use of communitarian arguments by Dominique Schnapper and Taguieff. These arguments presented citizenship as membership in a national culture, in opposition to postnational conceptions of Europe. Taguieff argued that republicans should not leave the rhetoric of national identity to the populist extreme right. Alain Finkielkraut's path from La Défaite de la pensée (1987) to L'Ingratitude (1999) is taken as symptomatic of this mutation, and the phrase nationaux-républicains de gauche entered the debate. Laborde argues that the two strands are in tension. Republicans adopt universalist-liberal reasoning in response to multicultural demands, but communitarian-nationalist reasoning in response to supranational ones. The arguments for promoting French culture abroad could also support recognition of regional or minority cultures within France, as the 1999 debate over the European Charter for Regional or Minority Languages demonstrated. An instrumental case based on democratic legitimacy partly avoids this tension: democracy requires a limited shared national culture to sustain trust and communication.
- Numbering – the Second and Third of the five numbered republics followed the restoration of republican government in 1848 and 1870. At the Liberation in 1944, republican government returned under the Provisional Government of the French Republic. The Fourth Republic's constitution was promulgated on 27 October 1946. The Fifth Republic replaced that constitution in 1958 without an interruption of republican government.

== Republican civil religion ==
The concept of a civil religion comes from Rousseau, who sketched it in his letter to Voltaire of 1756 and developed it in book IV, chapter 8 of The Social Contract: a civic "profession of faith" laying down the social maxims every citizen must accept and the fanatical ones he must reject, with any religion compatible with it tolerated and any other proscribed. Twentieth-century sociologists, above all Robert N. Bellah, detached the idea from Rousseau's "dogmas" and redefined it as the beliefs, symbols and rites that place the ultimate foundations of a social order beyond debate. In Jean Baubérot's account, the question in France has been closely bound to laïcité. Republican schools, civic instruction, national ceremonies and political symbols could serve functions associated elsewhere with civil religion, despite the Republic's formal rejection of an established faith. Baubérot proposes the hypothesis that the usual contrast between French republican laïcité and American civil religion obscures the changing relationship between secularism and civil religion in France. Civil religion, he argues, is an unexamined blind spot (an impensé) of the republican tradition, a notion that Olivier Ihl found to be "under interdict" in the Third Republic even though the problem it names never disappeared, and that Claude Nicolet avoids while repeatedly writing of a "civil profession of faith".

- Two sacred Frances – Baubérot draws on Jean-Paul Willaime's account of two rival images of France: France as eldest daughter of the Church and France as eldest daughter of the Republic and homeland of the rights of man. Baubérot argues that attempts at a republican civil religion since the Revolution faced a recurring obstacle: the civic religion of the Republic could not be joined to the common beliefs of the population, which remained largely Catholic, so that two candidates for the role fought a "war of civil religions" damaging to both. Citing Antoine Prost, Baubérot argues that the only civil religion that ever worked socially in France was the cult of the war dead after 1918, with the war memorial as its altar, precisely because it joined republicanism and Catholicism.
- The Combist moment (1901–1904) – Baubérot interprets the dominant form of laïcité under Émile Combes as tending toward civil religion: the Republic was declared under threat, "integral laïcité" and war on "clerical fanaticism" were the remedy, and members of religious congregations were forced to choose between secularisation and exile. Religious freedom was interpreted as freedom of "religious sentiment", which was treated as the true religion. Combes described clergy as enemies of religion. In this view, no intermediate body should stand between the Republic and the citizen. The movement was ritualised through the revolutionary symbols revived by the Third Republic (La Marseillaise, 14 July, the Panthéon, the cult of great men) and through free-thought rites such as civil baptisms and secular communions. Baubérot reads Combes's "spiritualist" speech of 26 January 1903 as evidence of his commitment to Rousseau's religious dogmas, noting that Jaurès placed him in the line of Rousseau and Robespierre. He contrasts Combes with republicans whose civil religion centred on the Republic itself. Patrie (homeland) and République (Republic) were meanwhile dissociated, Catholics suspected of loving the former without the latter and secularists the reverse. Clemenceau denounced the tendency in November 1903 as an "omnipotent secular state" that, to avoid the congregation, would turn France into one immense congregation.
- The turn of 1905 – in Baubérot's interpretation, the separation law and the follow-up laws of 1907–1908 moved away from civil religion. Briand, Jaurès and Pressensé no longer described the Republic as threatened. They instead framed the goal as equal treatment rather than emancipation from religion. In 1906, Briand insisted that the secular state was "not antireligious" but "areligious". Laïcité was explicitly separated from free thought (10 April 1905), the law demanded only civil rather than theological tolerance, and its amended article 4, which Pressensé modelled on American and Scottish legislation, handed church property to associations respecting the rules of their own faith, ruling out a schismatic "republican Catholicism". Clemenceau said that the law had "secularised" French laïcité. Baubérot describes the internal conflict as one between "republicans" (Buisson, Clemenceau) and "accommodators" (Briand, Jaurès, Pressensé). He argues that French public opinion never absorbed this reversal of perspective: it long credited Combes with the law and now classifies the law as a "compromise". Baubérot describes the founders as universalists rather than exceptionalists: Buisson and Briand ranked countries as more or less laïque and did not count France the most so.
- Aftermath – in Baubérot's account, after 1905, the new settlement gradually displaced the older conflict between Catholicism and republicanism, though disputes over religion's place in national life continued. The constitutions of 1946 and 1958, with the agreement of the Christian-democratic MRP, formally declared the Republic laïque. Conflict over the school continued until 1984, when opposition to the proposed reform of private education was, in his interpretation, evidence that subsidised Catholic schools were no longer widely treated as representing a rival France; the failed revision of the Falloux law in 1994 marked another episode in the same dispute. The first headscarf affair of 1989, however, opened a new context in which the problem concerned Islam, immigration and cultural pluralism rather than the old confrontation between the Republic and Catholicism.
- Ecumenism of the rights of man – Baubérot cites Willaime's reading of the bicentenary of 1989 as an ethical recomposition of civil religion around human rights. Baubérot argues that human rights had again become a required civil profession of faith, as in 1901–1904, but with two differences: they were not the same rights (women's civil and political rights were then excluded), and the republican reference in 1989 tended to include the established religions rather than exclude them, allowing a pacified laïcité to play the part of civil religion without clashing with common beliefs. He interprets the anti-"sect" campaign that culminated in the parliamentary report of 1995 and the law of June 2001, and since 1989 the demand for a "moderate" or "republican Islam", as evidence that a profession of faith was again demanded of particular religions, with an analogy to the "republican Catholicism" abandoned in 1905; he argues that suspicion of allegiance to a foreign power had shifted from Catholicism to Islam, and that some citizens were expected to prove commitments assumed of others.
- Catho-laïcité (Catholic-secular civil religion) – writing in 2007, Baubérot answers "yes and no" to Willaime's Catholic-secular civil religion. Among the evidence he cites in favour: Catholicism has acculturated to human rights since Vatican II; the old split between partisans of patrie and of République has vanished, the Republic having become an obligatory reference for figures from both camps (Chevènement, de Villiers); a declining but still historic Church supplies the calendar and the cathedrals for state funerals; and the expression "laïcité, a French exception", first heard around 1990 and current from the late 1990s, sets an identity-based laïcité against "Anglo-Saxon communitarianism", targeting both a supposedly communitarian Islam and globalisation, much as Maurras once defended an identity-based Catholicism against Protestant powers. As counterarguments, he cites militant secular groups still fighting the war of civil religions, with Condorcet as their last prophet; new disagreements over bioethics and morals; media portrayals of religions as sources of division; residues of the two Frances (a 1996 poll split 40 to 40 on commemorating the baptism of Clovis); and a legal framework that he considers broadly similar to those of other liberal democracies and anchored in the European Convention.
- Compared with the United States – Baubérot contrasts two declarations. The Declaration of 1776 names the Creator as the author of human rights. The Declaration of 1789 "recognises" them "in the presence and under the auspices of the Supreme Being", which Baubérot interprets as assigning God a passive role in approving the assembly's work. Baubérot attributes much of this difference to France's Catholic monopoly: identifying a divine author of rights was dangerous when a single Church could claim authority to interpret them. In his interpretation, political authority is thereby doubly sacralised, and once the rights of man were republicanised the "values of the Republic" could be invoked as Lincoln, King or Bush invoke God: nothing more than the Republic itself, yet in Bellah's terms still a civil religion, unavowed and constantly reborn.

== Republicanism in France by period ==
=== 18th century ===
- During the French Revolution – the monarchy was toppled by popular insurrection on 10 August 1792; the National Convention abolished the monarchy and proclaimed the Republic on 21 September, and on 22 September established the dating of public acts from Year I of the Republic. The republic came about more by accident than by design, as most revolutionaries of 1789 had aimed at a constitutional monarchy rather than the abolition of royalty.
  - Girondins (1791–1793) – produced an influential constitutional project, drafted principally by Condorcet. After their fall on 2 June 1793, the Montagnards produced the Constitution adopted on 24 June, which retained substantial elements of the Girondin draft.
  - The Mountain (1792–1795) – contributed to the drafting of the Constitution of 1793, which extended suffrage to all adult males.
    - Jacobins (1789–1794) – although Rousseau was a "virtual patron saint" of the Jacobin clubs, the Jacobins were skeptical of popular sovereignty; in foreign policy they expected France to defend her "natural frontiers" rather than annexing willing populations.
    - Cordeliers (1790–1795)
  - The Plain (1792–1795)
  - Thermidorians (1794–1799) – drew their firmest support from the prosperous beneficiaries of the revolution (buyers of national properties, state-bond investors, army suppliers); the Constitution of Year III (22 August 1795) established a "liberal" republic of proprietors and drastically reduced the electorate.
- Under the Directory – popular politics was suppressed in the name of stability and order; the five-member collegial executive, a compromise among the parties, met hostility from both left and right, and the experiment was never repeated.
  - Thermidorians (1794–1799)
  - Neo-Jacobins
    - Club du Panthéon
    - Club du Manège

=== 19th century ===
- Republicanism in France in the 19th century – the founders of the Third Republic referred constantly to the political, intellectual and social experiences of the century, most of which they had lived through personally; for Nicolet, the failures and lessons of 1848–1870 in particular shaped later republican theory and practice.
- Under the Consulate and First Empire – even after declaring himself an emperor, Napoleon kept using the name of the Republic. The transition to the Consulate preserved the "republic of notables" with a strong executive branch. The collegial executive shrank from five directors to three consuls and then to a single emperor in 1804. The three-consul arrangement was established by the Constitution of 13 December 1799. The First Empire was brought down by military defeats that endangered the nation itself, an experience that influenced republican views of Bonapartism.
  - Jacobin republicans
  - Idéologues – a movement of savants engaged in politics (Cabanis, Volney, Destutt de Tracy, Daunou), heirs of the Encyclopédistes and above all of Condorcet, for whom public instruction was at once the condition and the goal of a republic; having welcomed Brumaire, most turned to opposition, and Napoleon purged the Tribunat in 1802, suppressed the second class of the Institut in 1803 and banned their journal, the Décade philosophique, in 1807; for Nicolet their program amounted to "the Third Republic under the Directory", although that republic, quick to claim founding fathers, curiously neglected them, with only Condorcet emerging from the disgrace; the true heirs of the philosophes stayed "perfectly outmoded and almost forgotten" until François Picavet's study of 1891.
- Under the Bourbon Restoration
  - French Republicans under the Restoration (1815–1830) – the secret societies of the Restoration, such as the Charbonnerie, recruited their members mostly from former soldiers. This made the first generation of nineteenth-century republicans prone to direct action and military-style discipline.
- Under the July Monarchy – self-declared republicans were few and remained a small minority; republican ideas were voiced by a low-circulation press, openly (the Revue républicaine of 1833–1835) or by allusion in such titles as Le National, La Réforme and the Revue du Progrès.
  - French Republicans under the July Monarchy (1830–1848) – between 1830 and 1839, often-secret societies grouped around newspapers, such as the Société des Amis du Peuple, the Société des Droits de l'Homme, the Familles and the Saisons, and organized a few thousand highly active partisans. These revolutionary societies, after a string of failed insurrections from 1831 to 1839, dropped the Blanquist tradition of violent action, and by 1847 most republicans leaned toward the legal and peaceful road, including banquet campaigns borrowed from England. The Jacobins were the closest approach of the period to a modern party.
- Under the Second Republic – born of an improvised revolution, the regime was nonetheless marked by a constant concern for legalism: the provisional government organized elections to a Constituent Assembly within two months, and that freely elected assembly formally legalized the Republic; the June Days, a genuine civil war repressed by Cavaignac with the approval of most republicans, opened a lasting fissure in republican legitimacy.
  - Moderate Republicans (1848–1870) – held a majority in the Constituent Assembly elected in April 1848, but after the elections of 13 May 1849 republicans of all shades held only a minority in the new Legislative Assembly; the electoral law of 31 May 1850 then struck nearly three million voters from the rolls.
- Under the Second Empire – the political experience of the Empire, with the subversion of universal suffrage, the army participating in the coup, doubling of the administrative and police apparatus between 1852 and 1870, and personal power relying on plebiscites, taught harsh lessons to republicans.
  - French Republicans under the Second Empire (1852–1870) – republican deputies elected in 1857–1858 formed the opposition group known as the Five. Republican opposition expanded during the Empire's gradual liberalisation. A dwindling group of "irreconcilables" (Quinet, Louis Blanc, Ledru-Rollin, Hugo) refused the amnesty, and, while in exile, they picked up firsthand knowledge of other political systems that most republicans in France did not have; by 1869 Nicolet distinguishes several ideological currents: a Rousseauist-romantic one (Quinet, Michelet, Hugo, Louis Blanc), the "eclectics of liberty" (Jules Simon, Vacherot), the neo-Kantians (Renouvier, Barni), the positivists (Littré, and politically Gambetta, Ferry, Paul Bert), and a revolutionary current around Blanqui and Delescluze.
  - Moderate Republicans (1848–1870)
- Under the Third Republic – a monarchist-majority assembly adopted the constitutional laws of 1875 and framed them in attente monarchique (expectation of a monarchy), leaving open a restoration that never occurred. Pickles described them as the shortest and most flexible of France's republican constitutions. They remained in force from 1875 to 1940. The Constitution of 1958 surpassed their duration in 2024.
  - Republican Union (1871–1885)
  - Moderate Republicans (1871–1901)
  - French Republican Left (1871–1882)

=== 20th century ===
In the 1930s, republicanism faced challenges from Communists, traditionalist and monarchist opponents, and the influence of fascist ideologies in Italy and Germany. After France's defeat in 1940, Philippe Pétain's Vichy regime replaced the Republic with the État français (French State). After the war, the Communist Party supported republican values.

- Republicanism in France in the 20th century
- Under Vichy – no constitution was ever enacted; instead, a series of constitutional acts established the institutions of the regime and the "National Revolution" under the motto Travail, famille, patrie ("Work, Family, Fatherland"), and many republicans read the regime as la revanche de 1936.
- Under the Fourth Republic – the Constituent Assemblies of 1945–1946 were overwhelmingly republican, with over 300 of the 544 metropolitan deputies drawn from non-Communist, mostly left-wing democratic parties, and hoped to take the question of the regime out of politics for good; by 1951 almost one voter in two backed a Gaullist or Communist candidate rejecting the parliamentary system as practised, and right-wing anti-parliamentary movements, chiefly Poujadism, reappeared in 1953–1955. The drafters of 1946 were said to have been haunted by de Gaulle, the two Napoleons, Boulanger and Pétain, and designed their strait-jacket against them.
- Under the Fifth Republic – the crisis of 1958 broke out in Algiers rather than Paris, and the regime changed without bloodshed and by technically legal means. The Communists and a number of non-Communist politicians and groups opposed the new constitutional settlement, while most of the established parties supported de Gaulle; 79.25 per cent of metropolitan voters approved the new constitution on 28 September 1958. Opponents saw 1958 as another 1799 or 1851, a prelude to dictatorship, while others saw de Gaulle as the last rampart between the Republic and fascism; for Pickles, the most criticised provisions of the text were out of harmony with the republican traditions embodied in earlier constitutions.
- Republican revival of the 1980s and 1990s – many observers regarded the 1989 bicentenary as marking the end of the Republic as a regulative ideal. Yet as Marxism declined, renewed interest in the republican tradition emerged, especially in ministerial rhetoric about education and immigration. The 1988 report of the Commission de la nationalité declared that the weakening of institutions embodying "universal values" was the real danger for the nation's future and reaffirmed a policy of full integration combined with a strong French identity; Michel Rocard's government responded by creating the Haut Conseil à l'intégration, whose reports through the 1990s restated a doctrine of integration in four rules (state secularism that respects but does not support religions; integration of individuals rather than groups; rights and duties on both sides; equal treatment of immigrants and natives) and rejected any recognition of collective rights or "positive discrimination". The headscarf affairs of 1989 and 1993, the polemics over European integration and the defence of the exception culturelle kept the Republic at the centre of debate. In September 1998, weeks after the press had celebrated the World Cup victory as proof that the integration model worked, Debray, Max Gallo, Jacques Julliard, Blandine Kriegel, Mona Ozouf, Anicet Le Pors and others published the manifesto "Républicains, n'ayons plus peur!" in Le Monde. Critics read it as a call for moral order.

Prominent parties:

- Republican, Radical and Radical-Socialist Party (PRV, since 1901), the oldest active political party in France
- Democratic Republican Alliance (ARD, 1901–1949), also known as the Democratic Republican Party (1911–1917), Republican Democratic and Social Party (PRDS, 1920–1926), and Democratic Alliance (AD, from 1926)
- Republican Federation (FR, 1903–1948)
- Popular Republican Movement (MRP, 1944–1967), a Christian-democratic party founded by former Resistance members and a major participant in Fourth Republic governments; it later lost ground to the Centre démocrate.
- Republican Party of Liberty (PRL, 1945–1951), formed by figures from the pre-war parliamentary right, including the Republican Federation and Democratic Alliance, and later absorbed into the National Centre of Independents and Peasants (CNIP)
- Independent Republicans (RI, 1962–1977), led by Valéry Giscard d'Estaing; the parliamentary grouping emerged in 1962 from deputies who broke with the CNIP in support of Charles de Gaulle, and was organised as the National Federation of Independent Republicans in 1966
- Republican Party (PR, 1977–1997), successor to the Independent Republicans and one of the principal components of the Union for French Democracy (UDF); it became Liberal Democracy in 1997
- Popular Party for French Democracy (PPDF, 1995–2003), a UDF component created from the Perspectives and Realities movement and associated with supporters of Giscard
- Independent Republican and Liberal Pole (PRIL, 1998), formed by former Liberal Democracy members who chose to remain in the UDF after Liberal Democracy left it

== 21st century ==
- Laïcité and national identity – politicians across the spectrum appealed to republican values, but the left disagreed over Islam, immigration and cultural pluralism.
- Republican front – voters rallied behind Jacques Chirac against the far right in the 2002 French presidential election; such cooperation weakened in 2017 and 2022.
- 2005 French European Constitution referendum – the "no" campaign drew support from both left and right.
- François Hollande's proposed citizenship reform (2016) – a plan to broaden the grounds for revoking citizenship for terrorist crimes; it divided the left and was abandoned.
- Neoliberalism and globalism – Chabal and Behrent argue that the revival of republicanism made national identity a central political issue; disputes over republican values and market policies cut across the left–right divide.
- 2022 French legislative election – contested by the newly formed New Ecological and Social People's Union (NUPES); the presidential camp lost its absolute majority and the National Rally gained seats.

Prominent parties:

- Union for a Popular Movement (UMP, 2002–2015)
- Democratic Movement (MoDem, founded 2007), successor to the UDF and a source of support for Macron's 2017 presidential campaign.
- Left Party (PG, founded 2008), Mélenchon's alternative to the Socialist Party.
- The Republicans (LR, since 2015), successor to the UMP
  - Senate Republicans, the Senate parliamentary group of the UMP and, since 2015, LR
- Renaissance, founded by Macron as En Marche! in 2016; Chabal and Behrent place it at the globalist and neoliberal pole of their analysis.
- La France Insoumise (LFI), founded by Mélenchon in 2016; it led the negotiations to form NUPES before the 2022 legislative elections.

== See also ==
- Republican regime in France
- French Republican calendar

== Sources ==
- Baubérot, Jean (2007). "Existe-t-il une religion civile républicaine ?" [Is There a Republican Civil Religion?] (PDF). French Politics, Culture & Society (in French). 25 (2): 3–18. doi:10.3167/fpcs.2007.250202.
- Blachèr, Philippe (2023). "2024. Record de longévité de la Constitution" [2024: The Constitution's longevity record]. La Constitution de 1958 à nos jours [The Constitution from 1958 to the Present] (PDF) (in French). With Jean Garrigues; preface by Laurent Fabius (2nd ed.). La Documentation française. p. 251. ISBN 978-2-11-157849-4.
- Chabal, Emile; Behrent, Michael C. (2022). "Between neo-liberalism and the nation: France's political landscape in 2022". Modern & Contemporary France. 30 (4): 517–533. doi:10.1080/09639489.2022.2134327.
- Fontana, Biancamaria (2024). "French Republicanism". In Lovett, Frank; Sellers, Mortimer (eds.). The Oxford Handbook of Republicanism. Oxford University Press. doi:10.1093/oxfordhb/9780197754115.013.6. ISBN 978-0-19-775411-5.
- Hanson, Paul R. (2002). "Republicanism in France". In Kors, Alan Charles (ed.). Encyclopedia of the Enlightenment. Vol. 3. Oxford: Oxford University Press. pp. 431–433. ISBN 978-0-19-510430-1.
- Jennings, Jeremy (2000). "Citizenship, Republicanism and Multiculturalism in Contemporary France". British Journal of Political Science. 30 (4): 575–597. JSTOR 194286.
- Laborde, Cécile (2001). "The Culture(s) of the Republic: Nationalism and Multiculturalism in French Republican Thought". Political Theory. 29 (5): 716–735. JSTOR 3072536.
- "République" [Republic]. Histoire de France (in French). Larousse. 2005. p. 1053.
- Mény, Yves (2016). "Republicanism: A Transatlantic Misunderstanding". In Elgie, Robert; Grossman, Emiliano; Mazur, Amy G. (eds.). The Oxford Handbook of French Politics. Oxford University Press. pp. 13–43. doi:10.1093/oxfordhb/9780199669691.013.2. ISBN 9780199669691.
- Nicolet, Claude (2014) [1982]. L'idée républicaine en France (1789–1924) [The Republican Idea in France (1789–1924)] (EPUB) (in French). Paris: Gallimard. ISBN 978-2-07-209769-0.
- Pickles, Dorothy (2022) [1960, rev. ed. 1965]. The Fifth French Republic (PDF). Routledge Revivals. Abingdon; New York: Routledge. doi:10.4324/9781003346906. ISBN 978-1-03-238811-3.
- "Loi du 1er juillet 1901 relative au contrat d'association : article 7" [Law of 1 July 1901 on associations: Article 7] (in French). Légifrance.
- "Loi du 10 janvier 1936 sur les groupes de combat et milices privées" [Law of 10 January 1936 on combat groups and private militias] (in French). Légifrance.
- "Code de la sécurité intérieure : article L212-1" [Internal Security Code: Article L212-1] (in French). Légifrance.
- "Gouvernement provisoire de la République française et restauration de la légalité républicaine" [Provisional Government of the French Republic and restoration of republican legality] (in French). Assemblée nationale.
- "La Constitution de 1946 et l'instauration de la IVe République" [The Constitution of 1946 and the establishment of the Fourth Republic] (in French). Assemblée nationale.
- "Consulat et Premier Empire" [Consulate and First Empire] (in French). Assemblée nationale.
- "Les oppositions rencontrées par le Second Empire" [Opposition to the Second Empire] (in French). Fondation Napoléon.
- "MRP" [Popular Republican Movement]. Encyclopédie Larousse (in French). Larousse.
