= Étienne Joseph Louis Garnier-Pagès =

French politician (1801–1841)

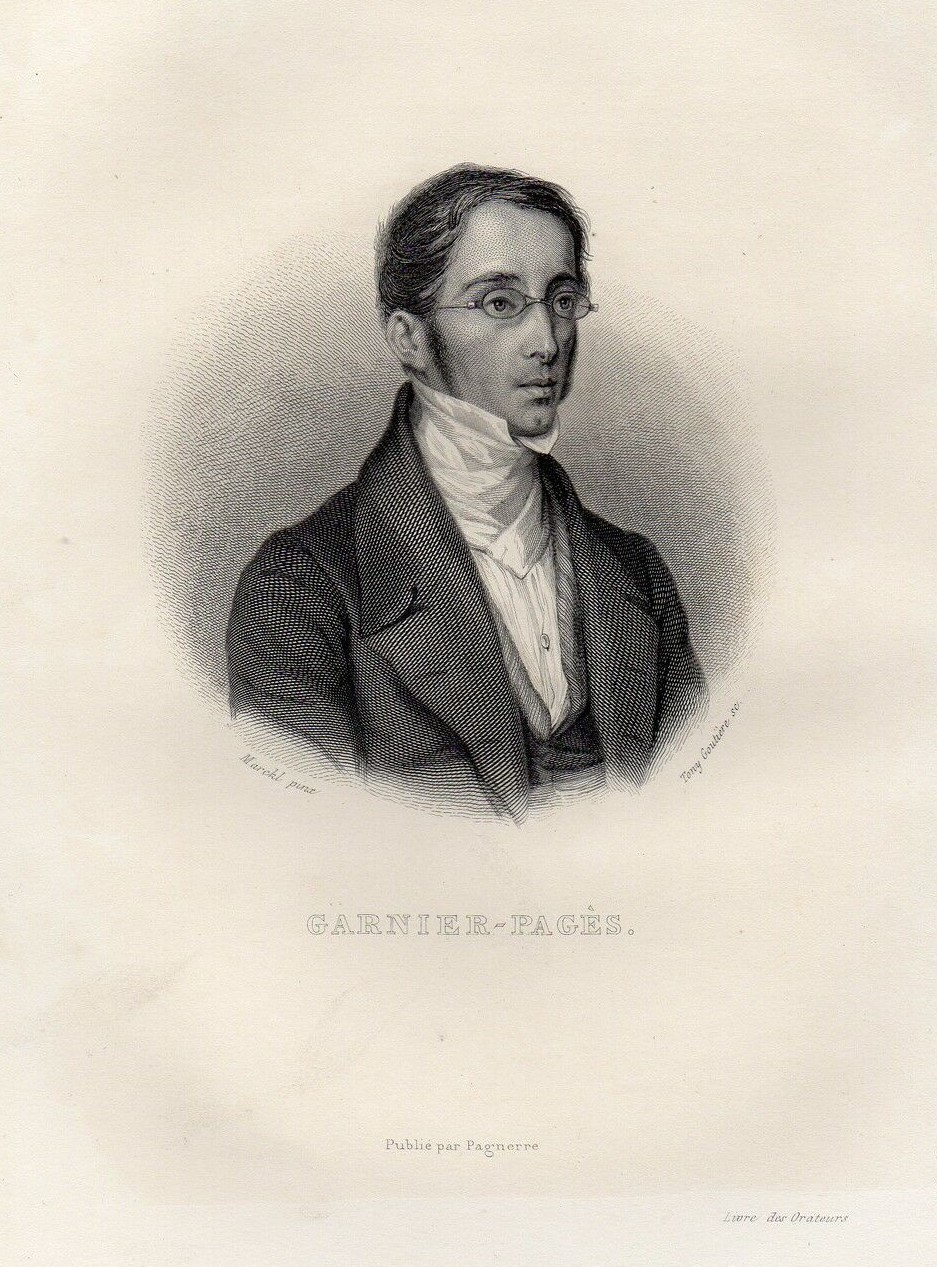
Étienne Joseph Louis Garnier-Pagès

Étienne Joseph Louis Garnier-Pagès (December 27, 1801 – June 23, 1841) was a French politician, born at Marseille.

Soon after his birth his father Jean Francois Garnier, a naval surgeon, died, and his mother married Simon Pagès, a college professor, by whom she had a son. The boys were brought up together, and took the double name Garnier-Pagès.

Étienne found employment first in a commercial house in Marseille, and then in an insurance office in Paris. In 1825 he began to study law, and made some mark as an advocate. A keen opponent of the Restoration, he joined various democratic societies, notably the Aide-toi, le ciel t'aidera, an organization for purifying the elections.

He took part in the revolution of July 1830; became secretary of the Aide-toi, le ciel t'aidera, whose propaganda he brought into line with his anti-monarchical ideas; and in 1831 was sent from Isère to the chamber of deputies. He was concerned in the preparation of the Compte rendu of 1832, and advocated universal suffrage. He was an eloquent speaker, and his sound knowledge of business and finance gave him a marked influence among all parties in the chamber.

His half-brother, Louis-Antoine Garnier-Pagès (1803 – October 31, 1878), fought on the barricades during the revolution of July.
