= Dorothy Pickles =

Historian and political scientist (1903–1994)

Dorothy Maud Pickles
- Born: August 8, 1903; Bridlington, England
- Died: November 26, 1994 (aged 91)

Academic background
- Education: London School of Economics; University of Leeds; University of Paris

Dorothy Maud Pickles (née Salmon; 8 August 1903 – 26 November 1994) was a British university teacher, historian, and broadcaster.

== Early life and education ==
Dorothy Maud Salmon was born in Bridlington, East Riding of Yorkshire on 8 August 1903; the eldest child of a hatmaker and physical education teacher. A scholarship enabled her to enter University of Leeds from where she received a first-class Bachelor of Arts degree in French (1925). After obtaining another scholarship, Salmon went to the Sorbonne to pursue her master's degree (1925–27).

== Career ==
After finishing college, Salmon was appointed a teacher at Portsmouth College but could not continue for long. When her husband William Pickles was appointed a lecturer at the London School of Economics (LSE), they shifted to the city. Here Dorothy enrolled for a B.Sc. in Political Science from LSE. She completed her degree with first class honours in 1936 and also won the Hugh Lewis Essay Prize. When a post for lecturer in Government was added, Pickles applied for it but Harold Laski appointed William instead.

The year 1938 saw the publication of Pickles's first book The French Political Scene. During World War II, she published pamphlets with her husband and was appointed in the French division of Ministry of Information, which handled information to and from the French Resistance. Her next book France Between the Republics was published in 1946.

Pickles was involved in British politics as well, and contested the 1950 general election as the Labour candidate for Finchley, but lost to Conservative John Crowder by 12,579 votes.

The Pickles maintained close connections with leaders of the Socialist International and acted as translators during some of its meetings. She, for the year 1960, was a visiting professor at the Columbia University. Pickles authored a dozen books which were translated to Dutch, Spanish, Arabic, Greek, and Hindi languages, while also being a contributor to multiple academic journals.

== Personal life ==
Salmon met her future husband William Pickles, while studying at the Sorbonne. They married on 15 December 1928 and while she was pursuing her degree at LSE, Dorothy gave birth to their only child, a daughter whom they named Judith Louis. William died in 1979.

== Death and legacy ==
Pickles has been described as a "noted authority on French politics" and "the doyenne of French studies in Great Britain". She died on 26 November 1994.

== Works ==
- Pickles, Dorothy Maud (1937). The French Political Scene. London: Thomas Nelson and sons.
- Pickles, Dorothy (1953). "The Political Role of Women" (PDF). International Social Science Bulletin. V (1). UNESCO: 75–104.
- Pickles, Dorothy Maud (1946). France Between The Republics. London: London Contact.
- Pickles, Dorothy Maud (1951). Introduction to Politics. London: Sylvan Press.
- Pickles, Dorothy Maud (1953). French Politics: The First Years of the Fourth Republic. London: Royal Institute of International Affairs.
- Pickles, Dorothy Maud (1955). France: The Fourth Republic. London: Methuen.
- Pickles, Dorothy Maud (1956). France: Our Unknown Neighbour (pamphlet). London: British Broadcasting Corporation.
- Pickles, Dorothy Maud (1960). The Fifth French Republic. New York: Praeger.
- Pickles, Dorothy Maud (1963). Algeria and France: From Colonialism to Cooperation. New York: Praeger.
- Pickles, Dorothy Maud (1964). France. London: Oxford University Press.
- Pickles, Dorothy Maud (1966). The Uneasy Entente: French Foreign Policy and Franco-British Misunderstandings. London: Oxford University Press.
- Pickles, Dorothy Maud (1970). Democracy. London: Batsford.
- Pickles, Dorothy Maud (1972). The Government and Politics of France. London: Methuen.
- Pickles, Dorothy Maud (1982). Problems of Contemporary French Politics. London: Methuen.
