= Joseph Guinard =

French politician

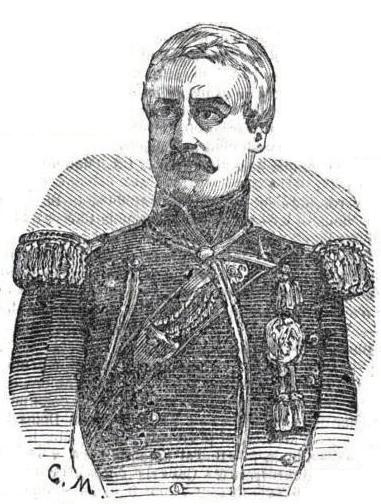
Joseph-Auguste Guinard

Joseph-Auguste Guinard (1799–1874) was a French politician. He was elected as a deputy to the Constituent Assembly in 1848 through 1849. In the Constituent Assembly, Guinard caucused with the Mountain party. On January 15, 1849, he took part in uprisings by the Mountain party.
