= The Victors of the Bastille in Front of the Hôtel de Ville =

Painting by Paul Delaroche

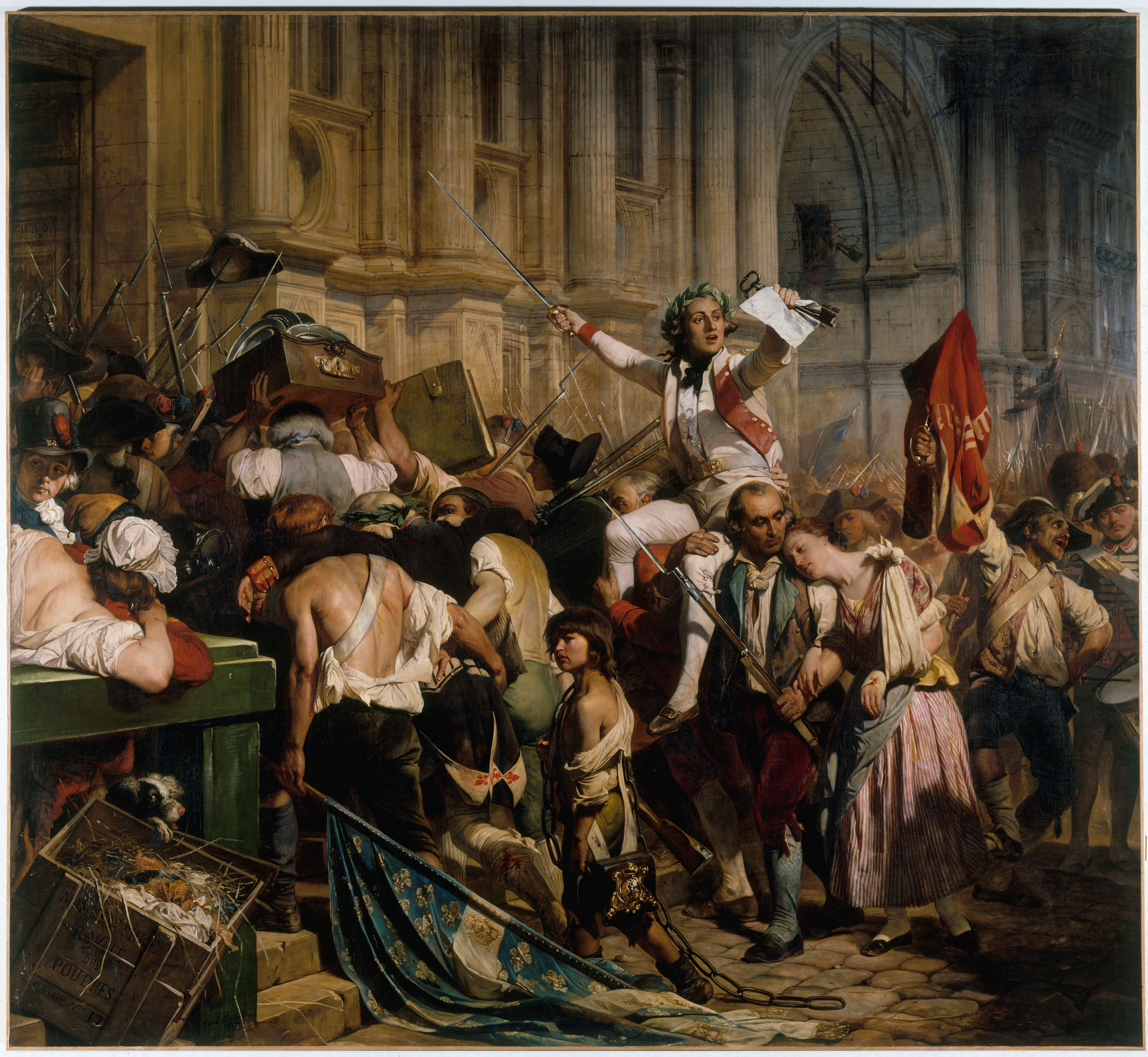
- Artist: Paul Delaroche
- Year: c. 1835
- Medium: Oil on canvas
- Dimensions: 400 cm × 435 cm (160 in × 171 in)
- Location: Petit Palais; Paris

The Victors of the Bastille in Front of the Hôtel de Ville (Les Vainqueurs de la Bastille devant l'Hôtel de Ville) is a large oil on canvas painting by French painter Paul Delaroche, from c. 1835. It is held in the Petit Palais, in Paris.

== Subject ==
On the evening of 14 July 1789, the crowd who had stormed the Bastille, wounded but triumphant, arrived in front of the Hôtel de Ville, bearing trophies seized from the fortress. The central figure in the painting, Jacob Job Élie, is brandishing in his right hand a sword and in his left hand the key to the fortress and a letter signed by de Launay, its governor, who had just been lynched.

== History ==
Shortly after the accession of Louis-Philippe I, Delaroche, Cogniet, Schnetz, and Drolling were commissioned to paint four large canvases for the Throne Room in the Hôtel de Ville to celebrate the heroes of the revolutions of July 1789 and July 1830. Delaroche was charged with depicting “the People returning victorious from the Bastille.” He began work on it in 1834, and Charles Séchan assisted him with drawing the architectural elements of the background. Purchased from the artist in 1839, the painting was never hung during the reign of Louis-Philippe. It was placed in external storerooms, and thus escaped the fire that destroyed the Hôtel de Ville in the semaine sanglante of 1871.

While the original canvas is in the collection of the Petit Palais, the Musée d'Orsay also holds an 1858 albumen print photograph of the work by Robert Jefferson Bingham, and the Louvre holds a sketch for the work by Delaroche.

== Restoration ==
The work was restored in 2015 with sponsorship from the Galerie Mendes.

== See also ==
- Fight in Front of the City Hall on 28 July 1830
