= Liberty Leading the People =

1830 painting by Eugène Delacroix

- La Liberté guidant le peuple (French)
- The painting after the 2024 restoration
- Artist: Eugène Delacroix
- Year: 1830
- Medium: Oil on canvas
- Dimensions: 260 cm × 325 cm (102.4 in × 128.0 in)
- Location: Louvre, Paris

Liberty Leading the People (French: La Liberté guidant le peuple [la libɛʁte ɡidɑ̃ lə pœpl]) is a painting of the Romantic era by the French artist Eugène Delacroix, commemorating the July Revolution of 1830 that toppled King Charles X (r. 1824–1830). A bare-breasted "woman of the people" with a Phrygian cap personifying the concept and Goddess of Liberty, accompanied by a young boy brandishing a pistol in each hand, leads a group of various people forward over a barricade and the bodies of the fallen while holding aloft the flag of the French Revolution—the tricolour, which again became France's national flag after these events—in one hand, and brandishing a bayonetted musket with the other. The figure of Liberty is also viewed as a symbol of France and the French Republic known as Marianne. The painting is sometimes wrongly thought to depict the French Revolution of 1789.

Liberty Leading the People is exhibited in the Louvre in Paris.

== History ==
By the time Delacroix painted Liberty Leading the People, he was already the acknowledged driving force of the Romantic school in French painting. Delacroix, who was born as the Age of Enlightenment was giving way to the ideas and style of romanticism, rejected the emphasis on precise drawing that characterised the academic art of his time, and instead gave a new prominence to freely brushed colour.

Liberty Leading the People before restoration

Delacroix painted this work in the autumn of 1830. In a letter to his brother dated 21 October, he wrote: "My bad mood is vanishing thanks to hard work. I've embarked on a modern subject—a barricade. And if I haven't fought for my country at least I'll paint for her." The painting was first exhibited at the official Paris Salon of 1831.

== Symbolism ==
Delacroix depicted Liberty as both an allegorical goddess-figure and a robust woman of the people. The mound of corpses and wreckage acts as a kind of pedestal from which Liberty strides, barefoot and bare-breasted, out of the canvas and into the space of the viewer. The Phrygian cap she wears had come to symbolize liberty during the first French Revolution of 1789. The painting has been seen as a marker of the end of the Age of Enlightenment, as many scholars see the end of the French Revolution as the start of the Romantic era.

The fighters are from a mixture of social classes, ranging from the bourgeoisie represented by the young man in a top hat, a student from the prestigious École Polytechnique wearing the traditional bicorne, to the revolutionary urban worker, as exemplified by the boy holding pistols. What they have in common is the fierceness and determination in their eyes. Aside from the flag held by Liberty, a second, minute tricolore can be discerned in the distance flying from the towers of Notre-Dame.

The identity of the man in the top hat has been widely debated. Modern art historians refute the idea that it was a self-portrait of Delacroix. In the late 19th century, it was suggested the model was the theatre director Étienne Arago; others have suggested the future curator of the Louvre, Frédéric Villot; but there is no firm consensus on this point.

Several of the figures are probably borrowed from a print by popular artist Nicolas Charlet, a prolific illustrator who Delacroix believed captured, more than anyone else, the peculiar energy of the Parisians.

== Purchase and exhibition ==
The French government bought the painting in 1831 for 3,000 francs with the intention of displaying it in the throne room of the Palais du Luxembourg as a reminder to the "citizen-king" Louis-Philippe of the July Revolution, through which he had come to power. This plan did not come to fruition, and the canvas hung in the palace's museum gallery for a few months before being removed due to its inflammatory political message. After the June Rebellion of 1832, it was returned to the artist. According to Albert Boime,

Champfleury wrote in August 1848 that it had been "hidden in an attic for being too revolutionary." Although Louis-Philippe's Ministry of the Interior initially acquired it as a gesture to the Left, after the uprising at the funeral of Lamarque in June 1832 it was never again openly displayed for fear of setting a bad example.

Delacroix was permitted to send the painting to his aunt Félicité for safekeeping. After the Second Republic was established following the revolution of 1848, it was briefly exhibited that year and again during the Second Empire in the Salon of 1855. The recently established Third Republic finally acquired the painting in 1874 for the Louvre's collection in Paris.

In 1974–75, the painting was the featured work in an exhibition organized by the French government, the Metropolitan Museum of Art in New York, and the Detroit Institute of Arts as a Bicentennial gift to the people of the United States. The exhibition, entitled French Painting 1774–1830: The Age of Revolution, marked a rare display of the Delacroix painting, and many of the other 148 works, outside France. The exhibition was first shown at the Grand Palais from 16 November 1974 to 3 February 1975. It moved to Detroit from 5 March to 4 May 1975, then to New York from 12 June to 7 September 1975.

In 1999, it was flown on board an Airbus Beluga from Paris to Tokyo via Bahrain and Calcutta in about 20 hours. The large canvas, measuring 2.99 metres (9.8 feet) high by 3.62 metres (11.9 feet) long, was too large to fit into a Boeing 747. It was transported in the vertical position inside a special pressurised container provided with isothermal protection and an anti-vibration device.

In 2012, it was moved to the new Louvre-Lens museum in Lens, Pas-de-Calais, as the starring work in the first tranche of paintings from the Louvre's collection to be installed. On 7 February 2013, the painting was vandalized by a visitor in Lens. An unidentified 28-year-old woman allegedly wrote an inscription ("AE911") on the painting. The woman was immediately arrested by a security guard and a visitor. A short time after the incident, the management of the Louvre and its Pas-de-Calais branch published a press release indicating that "at first glance, the inscription is superficial and should be easily removed". Louvre officials announced the next day that the writing had been removed in less than two hours by a restorer without damaging the original paint, and the piece returned to display that morning.

In September 2023, officials removed the work from display for its latest conservation and restoration. To prepare, the museum first subjected the painting to X-ray, ultraviolet, and infrared analysis. These examinations discovered that many of the painting's brilliant colors were muted under several layers of yellowed varnish and dust. The size of the canvas forced conservators to perform all work on-site.

The restored painting returned to display in April 2024. During their work, restorers discovered several things hidden under eight layers of varnish and dirt. In addition to the vivid white clouds and plumes of smoke, they found the central figure's dress was not entirely yellow but originally light grey with bits of gold. They believed this change occurred during restoration work completed in 1949. Also, they discovered a boot in the bottom left corner, which for many years had blended into the paving stones.

== Legacy ==
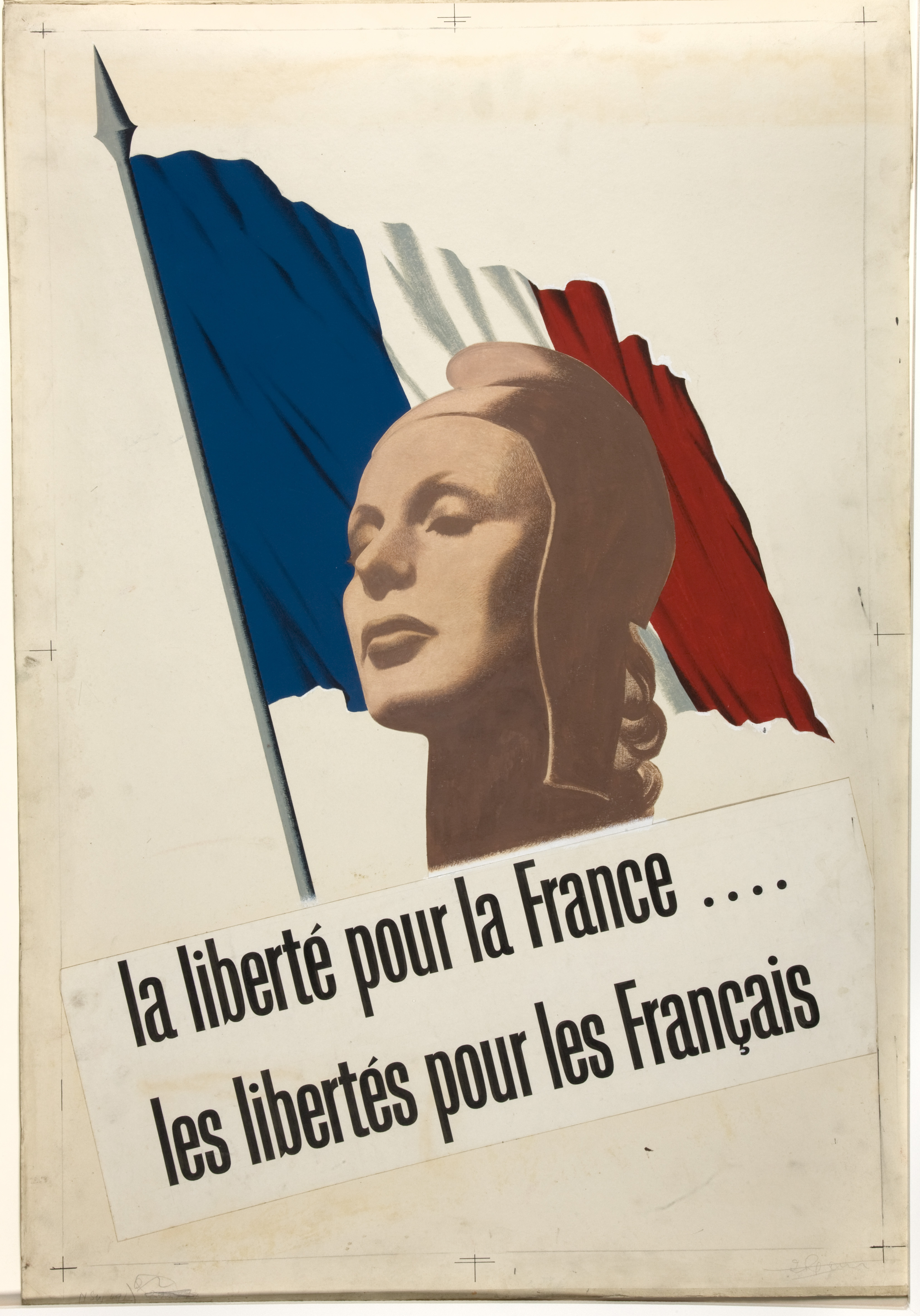
Freedom for France, Freedoms for the French (1940), a poster depicting Marianne

Although Delacroix was not the first artist to depict Liberty in a Phrygian cap, his painting may be the best-known early version of the figure commonly known as Marianne, a symbol of the French Republic and of France in general.

The painting may have influenced Victor Hugo's 1862 novel Les Misérables. In particular, the character of Gavroche is widely believed to have been inspired by the figure of the pistols-wielding boy running over the barricade. The novel describes the events of the June Rebellion two years after the revolution celebrated in the painting, the same rebellion that led to its being removed from public view.

Zeki Faik İzler's 1933 artwork for the tenth year of the Republic of Turkey, On the Path to Revolution, is known to have been inspired by Delacroix, as acknowledged by the artist himself. The painting symbolizes the women's role in the Turkish Revolution, in a similar manner it does with Marianne.

The painting inspired Frédéric Auguste Bartholdi's Liberty Enlightening the World, known as New York City's Statue of Liberty, which was given to the United States as a gift from the French a half-century after Liberty Leading the People was painted. The statue, which holds a torch in its hand, takes a more stable, immovable stance than that of the woman in the painting. An engraved version of part of the painting, along with a depiction of Delacroix, was featured on the 100 franc note from 1978 to 1995.

The painting has influenced classical music. George Antheil titled his Symphony No. 6 After Delacroix, and stated that the work was inspired by Liberty Leading the People. The imagery was adapted by Robert Ballagh to commemorate Ireland's independence struggle on an Irish postage stamp in 1979, the centenary of the birth of Pádraig Pearse,, and the painting was used for Coldplay's 2008 album cover Viva la Vida or Death and All His Friends, with the words Viva La Vida written in white. Rigoberta Bandini references the painting in the chorus of her 2021 song Ay mamá. The cover of the 2010 book Enough is Enough: How to Build a New Republic by Fintan O'Toole references the painting, but with Kathleen Ni Houlihan holding the Irish tricolour in Dublin while the leaders of the three main political parties at the time (Brian Cowen, Enda Kenny and Eamon Gilmore) lie on the ground.

During the 20 October 2011 episode of the BBC Radio 4 series In Our Time, host Melvyn Bragg led a panel discussion of the painting.

Liberty Leading the People made an appearance in the 11th episode ("EDGELORD – Revolution of the 14-Year-Olds") of the Netflix animation series Ghost in the Shell: SAC 2045.

The painting was featured in Vincenzo, a 2021 South Korean TV series starring Song Joong-ki in episode 7. It has also been reported as an influence on the thematic colors of the 2023 Tamil film Maaveeran.

A photograph of Aed Abu Amro taken during the 2018–2019 Gaza border protests by Mustafa Hassona on 22 October 2018, was considered by some a personification of the Liberty Leading the People.

The artwork makes a prominent appearance in the 2023 film John Wick: Chapter 4 where the main antagonist is seen standing before the painting inside the Louvre, which was notably closed to the public for the filming of the scenes.

Actors recreated the painting during the Opening Ceremonies of the 2024 Olympics at the Conciergerie. During the recreation, they were accompanied by the French version of "Do You Hear The People Sing?" from Les Misérables.

== See also ==
- Liberté, égalité, fraternité
- Liberty (goddess)
- Fight in Front of the City Hall on 28 July 1830, a similarly composed painting of the July Revolution by Jean-Victor Schnetz

== Bibliography ==
- Cook, Bernard A. (2006). Women and war: a historical encyclopedia from antiquity to the present. Santa Barbara, Calif. [u.a.]: ABC-Clio. ISBN 978-1-8510-9770-8.
- Noon, Patrick (10 June 2003). Crossing the Channel: British and French Painting in the Age of Romanticism. Harry N. Abrams. ISBN 978-1-8543-7513-1.
- Pastore, Stephen R. (2012) Zola and Delacroix: Genius Amidst the Turmoil. London: Oxford University Press.
- Pool, Phoebe (1969). Delacroix. London: Hamlyn. ISBN 978-0-6000-3796-5.
- Prideaux, Tom (1972). The World of Delacroix. Time-Life Books. p. 79. ISBN 978-0-8094-0262-5.
