= Villot =

Villot is a surname. Notable people with the surname include:

- Frédéric Villot (1809–1875), French printmaker
- Jean-Marie Villot (1905–1979), French prelate
