= Jacob Job Élie =

French general (1746–1825)

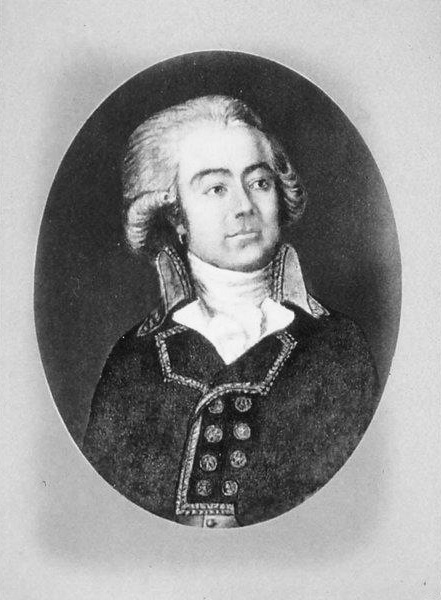
- Born: 26 November 1746; Wissembourg, Alsace, France
- Died: 5 February 1825 (aged 78); Varennes-en-Argonne, Meuse, France
- Military career
- Allegiance: Kingdom of France; Kingdom of the French; French First Republic; First French Empire
- Branch: Infantry
- Service years: 1766–1811
- Rank: General of division
- Unit: French Army
- Conflicts: French Conquest of Corsica; American Revolutionary War; First Battle of Ushant; Siege of Savannah; French Revolution; Storming of the Bastille; War of the First Coalition; Battle of Wattignies
- Awards: Knight of Saint Louis

Jacob Job Élie (26 November 1746 – 5 February 1825), or Jacques Job Élie was a French general of the Revolutionary and Napoleonic Wars. Along with Pierre-Augustin Hulin, he took part in and led the storming of the Bastille.

== Early life ==
Élie was born in Wissembourg on 26 November 1746 to Mathias Élie, an officer in the regiment d'Alsace, and Marie Françoise Schaffhauser. He had a younger brother named François who was born on 13 July 1748 and later became a captain. Before officially beginning his career, he served in the same regiment as his father. He later fondly recalled his childhood "amidst the troops", and cited Chevert as a source of inspiration to pursue a military career.

== Career ==
Élie entered into service on 2 December 1766, joining what was then known as the régiment d’Aquitaine. He participated in the Corsican campaign of 1769, during which he sustained a right knee injury while building a fascine bridge under the orders of General de Vaux. He was also present during the bombardments of Sousse and Bizerte during the campaign of Tunis and Algiers in 1770. Élie was later injured again by a pulley aboard the frigate la Topaze. He was dismissed on 2 December 1774 (or 1777 according to other sources), then enrolled into the Queen's Regiment (later the 41st Infantry Regiment) the following year.

He participated in two major events of the American Revolutionary War, the first being the 1778 campaign of Ushant under the command of the count du Chaffault and the second being the 1780 Siege of Savannah under the command of the count d'Estaing. He was promoted to sergeant on 1 November 1781, and tried unsuccessfully to be promoted to sub-lieutenant in 1787. He was later appointed standard-bearer on 1 August 1788. Condemned to remain a sub-officer in the Kingdom's army, his fortune soon changed with the dawn of the French Revolution.

On 14 July 1789, Élie took part in the storming of the Bastille, was the first to enter and negotiated the surrender of the fortress. His participation in the event opened up new career opportunities: He was later named a captain of the 5th Battalion of the 5th Division of the Paris National Guard on 1 September 1789, then a captain of the 103rd Infantry Regiment on 3 August 1791. Thereafter, he rose through the ranks rapidly. He was made a Knight of Saint Louis on 2 November 1791. He was named lieutenant colonel on 7 February 1793 and became a battalion chief commanding the vanguard of the Army of the Moselle under General Houchard and General Sigueville.

He was then promoted to brigadier general in the Army of the Ardennes on 30 July 1793, and assigned to the command of Givet and Charlemont. He was promoted to general of division on 3 September 1793, and he and his forces participated in the Battle of Wattignies as part of the larger Army of the North. He was later transferred to the Army of Sambre and Meuse on 2 July 1794. While serving in the Army of the Ardennes (later the Army of Sambre and Meuse), the people's representatives sent him to command Verdun in July 1794 and Mézières in 1795.

Élie seems not to have been in active service in 1795, as his name wasn't included in the general staff organisation announced on 13 June 1795. He was recalled to active service on 28 February 1796 and took command of Lyon on 28 March 1796. On 19 August 1796, he was assigned to the Army of the Alps under General Kellermann, then assigned to the command of Maurienne and Tarentaise on 22 October 1796. He was discharged on 18 March 1797.

== Storming of the Bastille ==
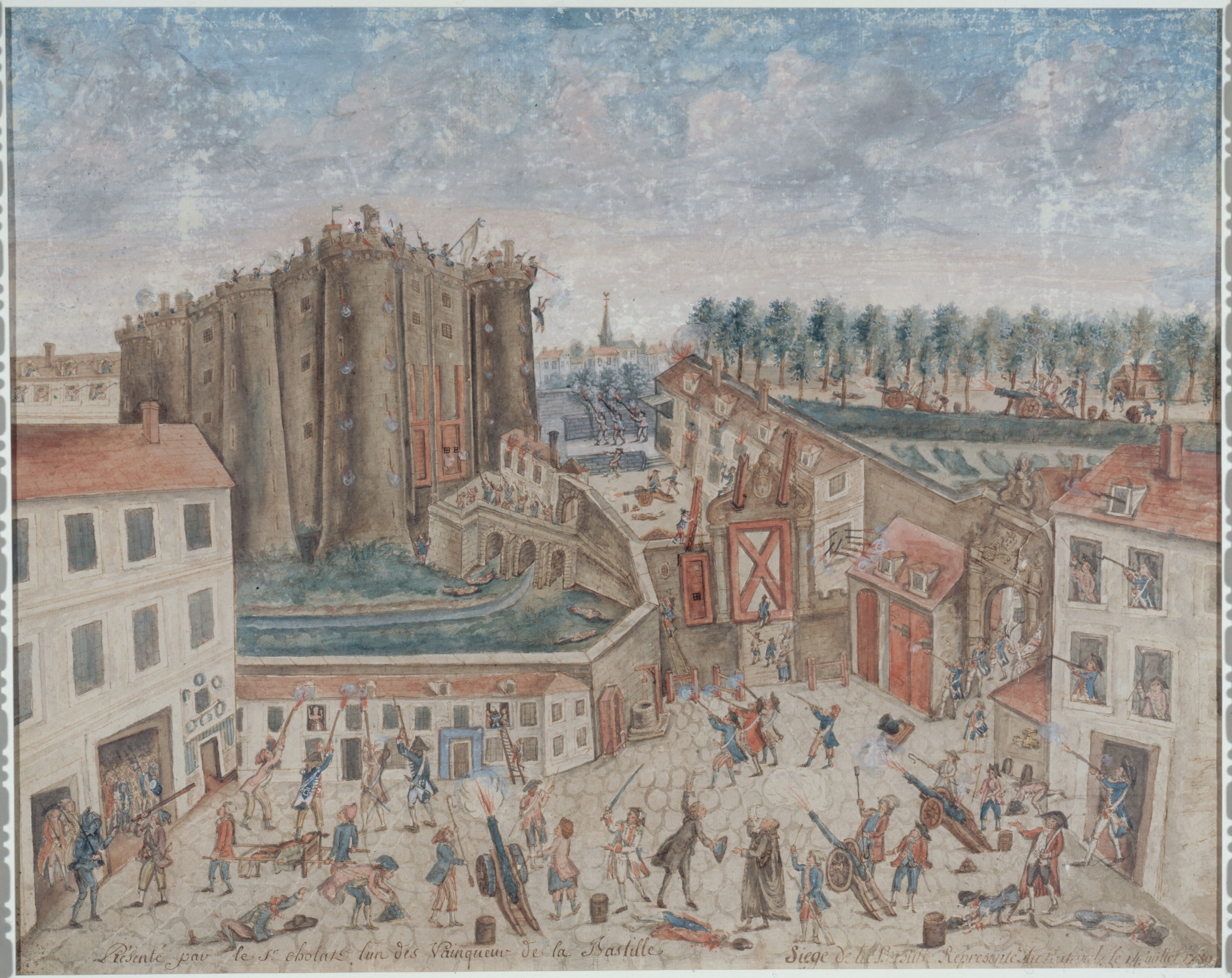
Siege of the Bastille, a gouache by Claude Cholat showing Élie as the officer in white commanding the cannoneers.

On 14 July 1789, Élie took part in the storming of the Bastille, was the first to enter and negotiated the surrender of the fortress. He was awarded a sword and a laurel wreath for the accomplishment, a scene immortalised in Paul Delaroche's The Victors of the Bastille in Front of the Hôtel de Ville. Élie was also reportedly offered the silverware of the Bastille, but refused it. He and Hulin attempted in vain to protect de Launay, the governor of the Bastille, from the violent crowds but were unable to. When the French guards asked for mercy for the remaining prisoners as a reward for their services, he added that this mercy would be more precious to him than all honours. A voice shouted: "Grace!", a cry repeated by the surrounding crowd. The prisoners, thirty-five invalid cannoneers, were accordingly saved and taken away.

== Later years ==
Following his discharge, he unsuccessfully sought a return to active service during the Consulate and First Empire and also applied for the position of prefect.

He retired on 21 June 1811 with a pension of 3434 francs and moved to a house on the rue du Château at Varennes-en-Argonne. His brother died on 25 September 1815 in Meuse.

He died in 1825 at Varennes.

== Legacy and quotations ==
Jacob Job is the central figure of The Victors of the Bastille in Front of the Hôtel de Ville by Paul Delaroche, seen brandishing in his right hand a sword and in his left hand the key to the Bastille and a letter signed by the marquis de Launay, its governor.

As recently as 1891, the Colmar Museum (known today as the Unterlinden Museum) had two oil portraits of Jacob Job and his brother François in its possession. The two men were depicted in uniform, and two swords were placed under their portraits. François's sword had no inscription, while Jacob Job's sword bore two inscriptions, one on the hilt and one on the blade itself. The hilt inscription read: "The elected representatives of Paris, meeting at the Hôtel de Ville, gave this sword to the brave Élie." The blade inscription read: "I stand as firm as a rock for the salvation of my country." They had been donated by Étienne-François Élie, François's son and Jacob Job's nephew.

According to John A. Flynn, Élie reportedly said the following to the Minister of War: "I marched persuaded of victory, hoping that the love of the Patrie, the character of the republican soldier, and the desire to defeat the tyrants would at least be the equal of experience and would prove disastrous to our enemies." This was after he and the levies he led as general had been defeated, though the timeframe is unclear.

According to Charles d'Hericault, Élie also said in 1793 that he "hopes to retire to Paris when there are no longer any despots to fight". In his retelling of the storming of the Bastille, d'Hericault paints a two-sided picture of the future general: on one hand, the man is a mythical hero who he nicknames the 'Prince of Conquerors', and whom Dusaulx describes as "reigning supreme, his eyes breathing carnage, his bristly hair and forehead covered in sweat throwing us back into heroic times". On the other, he's a potential opportunist whose military history is unclear and who seemingly continues to rest on his laurels many years after the events of the 14th of July.

According to Alphonse Halter, Élie is said to have proclaimed to the Committee of Public Safety that "the same arm that was fortunate enough to help overthrow the Bastille may perhaps teach the satellites of despots what republican valour is capable of". He also mentioned that he had "always professed the principles of a true sans-culotte".

== Bibliography ==
- "Generals Who Served in the French Army during the Period 1789 - 1814: Eberle to Exelmans".
- "ÉLIE Jacob Job, dit le brave ÉLIE" (in French).
- Charavay, Étienne (1887). Imprimerie nationale (ed.). Correspondance général de Carnot (in French). Vol. 3. Paris.
- d'Hericault, Charles. La France révolutionnaire 1789-1889. p. 76.
- Halter, Alphonse. Nouveau dictionnaire de biographie alsacienne., vol. 9, p. 788.
