= Fight in Front of the City Hall on 28 July 1830 =

Painting by Jean-Victor Schnetz

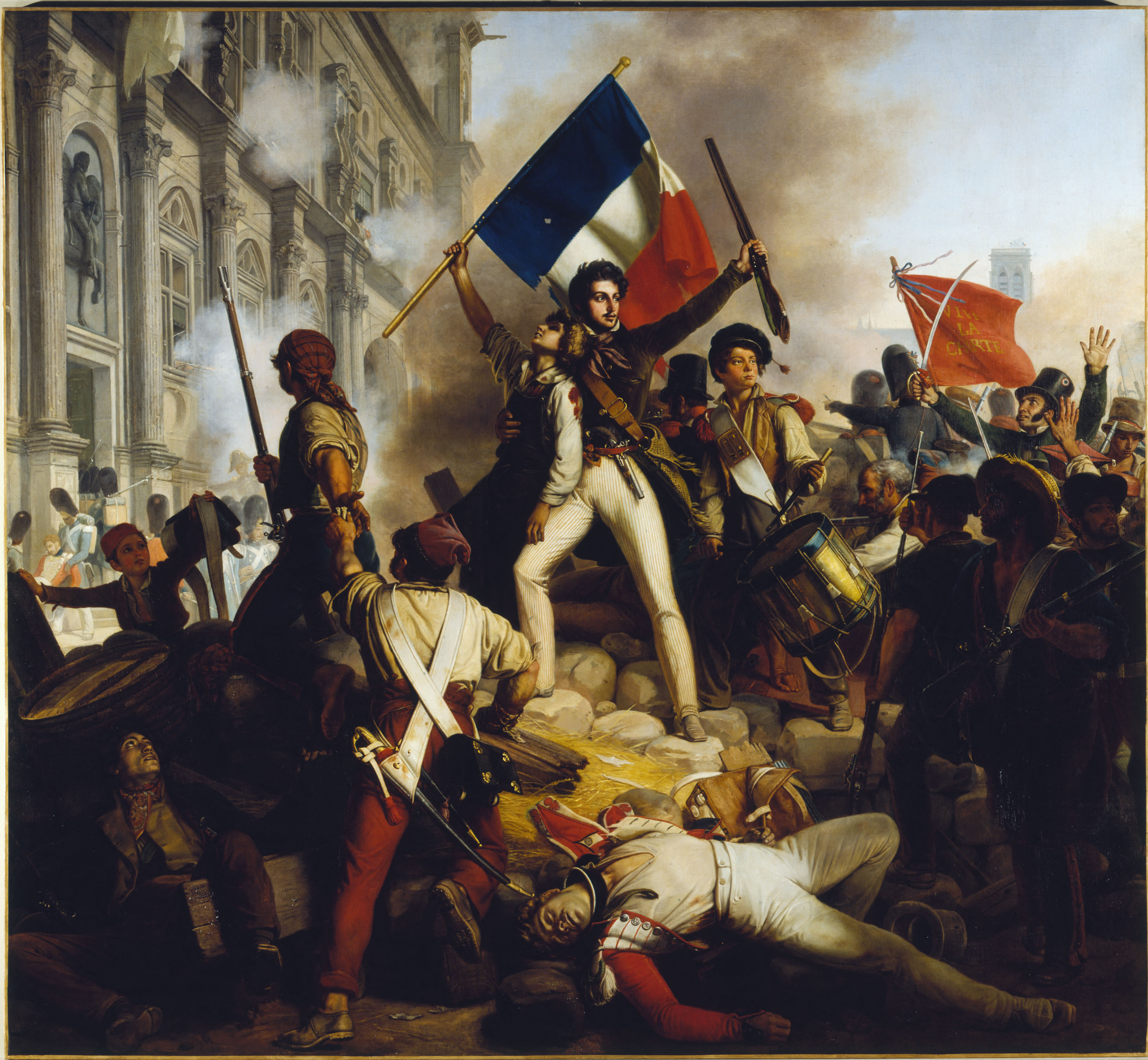
Fight in Front of the City Hall on 28 July 1830 (1833) by Jean-Victor Schnetz

Fight in front of the City Hall on 28 July 1830 (French: Combat devant l'Hôtel de Ville le 28 juillet 1830) is an oil on canvas painting by Jean-Victor Schnetz, from 1833. It is held in the Petit Palais, in Paris.

== Subject ==
Schnetz’s canvas illustrates the second day of the July Revolution of 1830. In reaction to oppressive orders signed by Charles X, the Paris crowds threw up barricades and seized the Hôtel de Ville. This emotive and romantic work focuses on the glorious death of the young hero on the barricades. A young student scales the barricade with his bayonet raised, pressing against his breast a working class youth who, like Victor Hugo’s Gavroche, expires as he raises the tricolour.

Around these central figures swirl rioters from all classes of society, drawn together in the struggle for liberty. However while the figures in Eugène Delacroix’s Liberty Leading the People surge towards the viewer with their weapons drawn, those in Schnetz’s canvas move within the confines of his composition, removing any element of threat that a large canvas of the armed urban poor might imply. Among the crowds are several boys - in addition to the dying flagbearer, a boy on the left of the scene is carrying ammunition over the barricade, while immediately behind the young man in the centre of the canvas, looking in the same direction as him, is a drummer-boy, reminiscent of the figure of Joseph Bara, central to the iconography of the 1789 revolution.

== History ==
Schnetz, Delaroche, Cogniet, and Drolling were commissioned to paint four large canvases for the Throne Room in the Hôtel de Ville to celebrate the heroes of the revolutions of July 1789 and July 1830. Schnetz’s painting was exhibited at the Salon of 1834 but was never hung in its intended location during the July Monarchy. It was placed in external storerooms, and thus escaped the fire at the City Hall in 1871. The subject was a popular one in the early 1830s. Other visual representations, often commissioned by the authorities, depicted the attack on the Hôtel de Ville, including works by Eugène Delacroix and (Le Combat du Pont d'Arcole) fr:Amédée Bourgeois (La Prise de l’Hôtel de Ville).

The work was restored in 2015 through the sponsorship of the Carré Rive Gauche endowment fund.

== Critical reception ==
Few critics were kind in their judgements of the work. Gustave Planche described it as a “deplorable aberration” on the part of the artist, wondering what could have impelled him to accept a commission so foreign to his talents. In painting this canvas, Planche concluded, Schnetz had altogether given up on painting, and judicious critics ought therefore to simply not discuss it. The Revue de Paris conceded that the painting was better than an ugly ceiling one only wished to forget, but suggested that Schnetz take himself off to Rome to benefit from the sunshine and recover some vigour before attempting to paint anything else.

Political views also coloured critics’ opinions. Those who treasured memories of the glorious days of July 1830, like Hilaire-Léon de Sazerac, found the painting lacking in spirit and fire, as well as rather too tidy a representation of the day’s tumultuous events. On the other hand the conservative fr:La Mode, which was strongly opposed to the July Monarchy, simply found it disgusting. The painting was, it said, one of a number in the Salon that were typical of the current age, as deplorable in their concept as in their execution, and as likely to inspire pity as to induce laughter. Since they had to be admitted to the Salon for political reasons, they might at least have been hidden away in an obscure corner rather than foolishly and pretentiously placed so as to gain the maximum attention. “Here, on a throne of paving stones, a sort of grocers boy raises himself up, supporting a wounded bootblack waving a large tricolour flag. Chimney-sweeps and manual workers running with blood and sweat hurry in every direction and crowd around the feet of quivering cadavers.” La Mode wondered which room of the Hôtel de Ville might be best suited to hang such a painting in - perhaps the room in which the present government, now blushing at its own origins, had been proclaimed? Another Legitimist critic, H.H.H., also denounced the painting as government propaganda and ridiculed the prominence it gave to boys of the street.

== See also ==
- The Victors of the Bastille in Front of the Hôtel de Ville
- Liberty Leading the People
- The Attack on the City Hall of Paris
