= HMS Topaze =

Four ships of the Royal Navy have borne the name HMS Topaze, after the French word for the gemstone Topaz:

- HMS Topaze (1793), a 38-gun fifth rate, previously the French frigate Topaze. She was handed over to the British in 1793 by French royalists, and was sold in 1814.
- HMS Topaze (1814), a 38-gun fifth rate, previously the French frigate Étoile. She was captured by Hebrus in 1814 and became a receiving ship in 1823. She was used as a target from 1850 and broken up in 1851.
- HMS Topaze (1858), a Liffey-class wood screw frigate launched in 1858 and sold in 1884.
- HMS Topaze (1903), a Topaze-class cruiser launched in 1903, and sold in 1921.

There was also a naval trawler named Topaze. She was formerly the trawler Melbourne launched in 1935, and used for anti-submarine training during the Second World War, before she sank after a collision with HMS Rodney in 1941. She does not seem to have been formally commissioned into the Royal Navy, and does not have the HMS prefix.
