= Frédéric Villot =

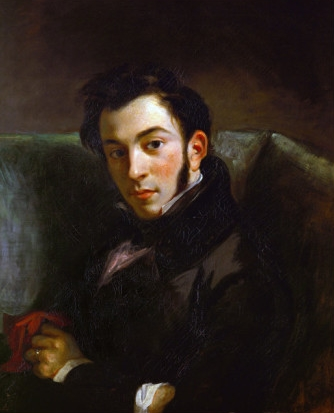
Marie-Joseph Frédéric Villot

Marie-Joseph Frédéric Villot (31 October 1809 – 27 May 1875) was a French printmaker and friend of the prominent Romantic painter Eugène Delacroix, was also an art historian, who served as paintings curator of the Louvre Museum from 1848 to 1861. Born at Liège, a possession of the Napoleonic Empire, he died at Paris.
