= Jean-Victor Schnetz =

French painter (1787–1870)

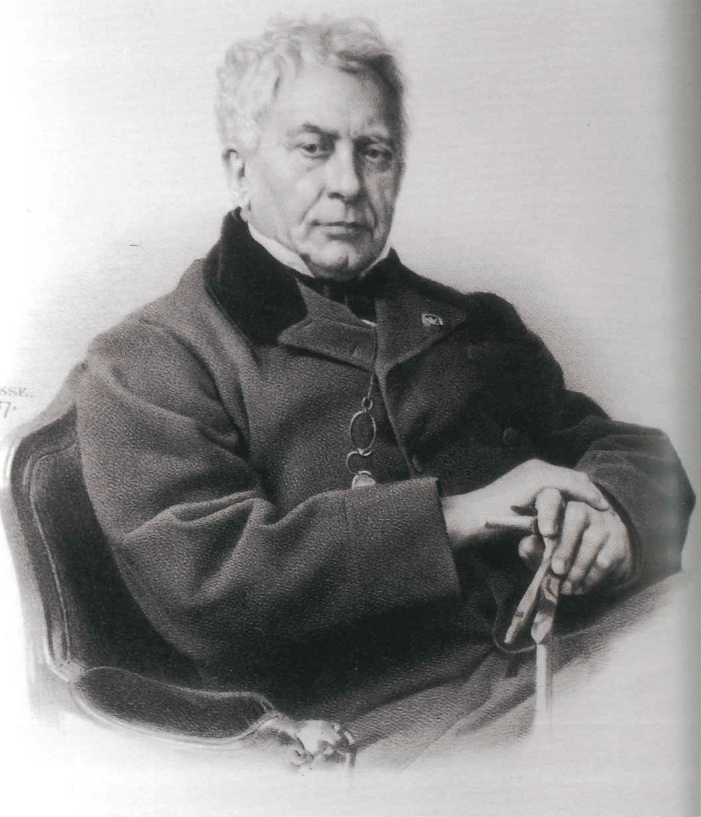
Portrait of Schnetz in 1867 by Jean-Baptiste-Adolphe Lafosse

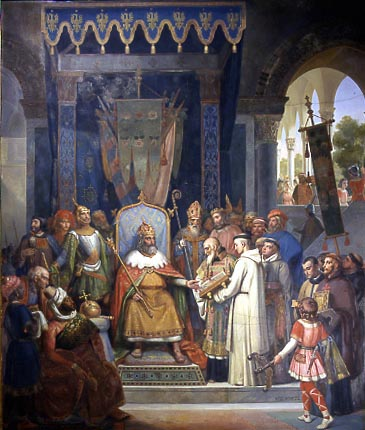
Charlemagne and Alcuin, painted 1830, at the Louvre

Jean-Victor Schnetz (French pronunciation: [ʒɑ̃viktɔʁ ʃnɛts]; 14 April 1787 in Versailles – 15 March 1870 in Paris) was a French academic painter well regarded for his historical and genre paintings.

== Biography ==
Schnetz studied in Paris under Jacques-Louis David. His works can be found at the Louvre Museum and the Petit Palais in Paris, the Château de Versailles in Versailles, the Hermitage in St. Petersburg, and the Museum of Fine Arts in San Francisco.

In 1837 Schnetz was elected to the Académie des Beaux-Arts, and he was twice the Director of the French Academy in Rome, from 1841 to 1846 then again in 1853-1866. Schnetz was made a Chevalier of the Legion of Honor in 1825, and raised to Commander in 1866.

== See also ==
- Combat devant l'Hôtel de Ville le 28 juillet 1830
