= Joseph Garnier =

French economist and politician

Joseph-Clément Garnier
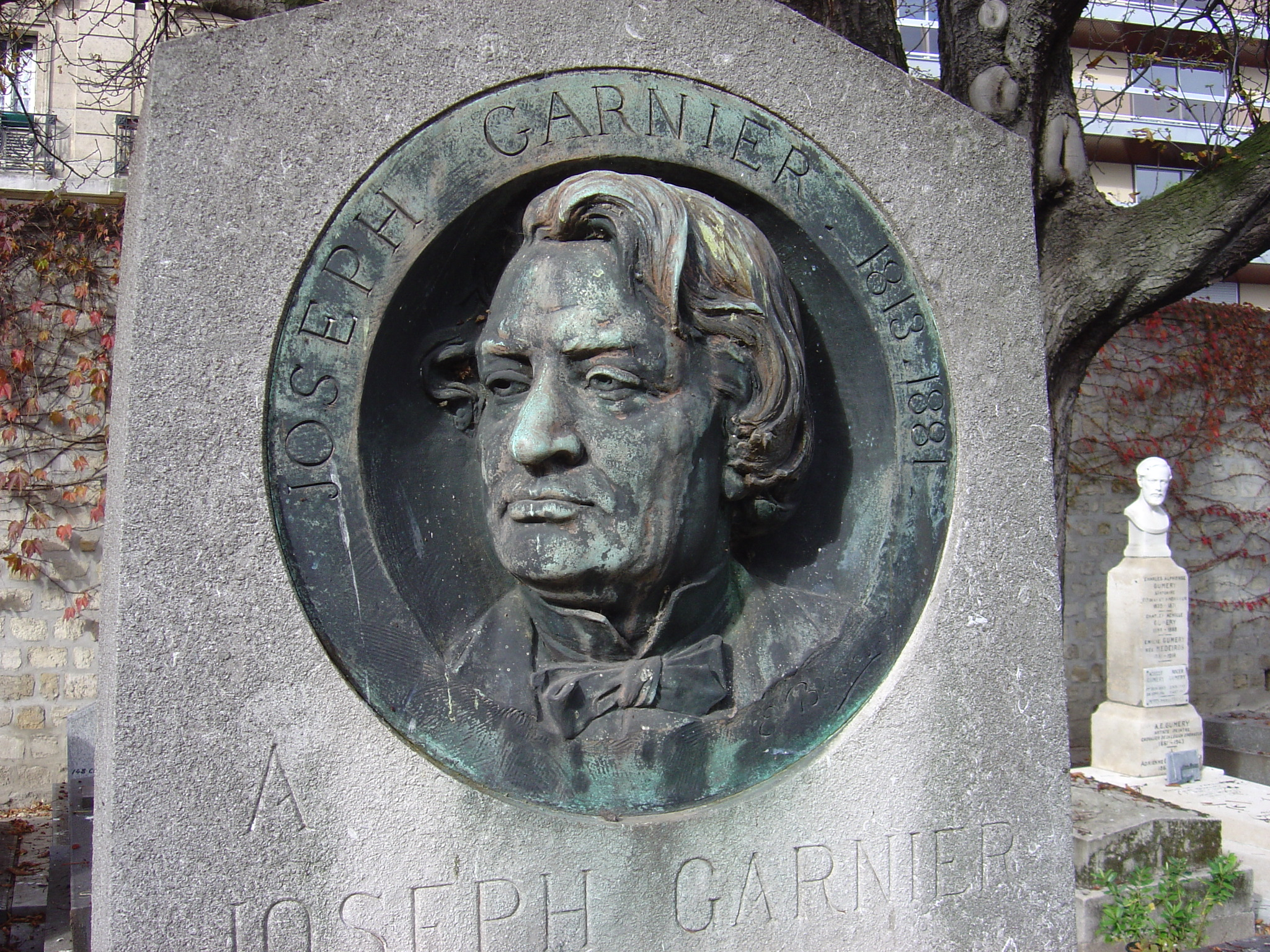
- Tomb of Joseph Garnier in the Montmartre cemetery. Relief by Louis-Ernest Barrias

Senator for Alpes-Maritimes
- In office 30 January 1876 – 25 September 1881

Personal details
- Born: 3 October 1813 Beuil, Alpes-Maritimes, France
- Died: 25 September 1881 (aged 67) Paris, France
- Occupation: Economist, politician

Joseph-Clément Garnier (3 October 1813 – 25 September 1881) was a French economist and politician. He was a prolific author and a member of many learned societies. In the last years of his life he was a Senator for Alpes-Maritimes.

== Life ==
Joseph Garnier was born in Beuil, Alpes Maritimes, on 3 October 1813, son of a farmer. He studied at the Draguignan, then in 1829 entered the Ecole supérieure de commerce de Paris. On the recommendation of the director of the school, the economist Jérôme-Adolphe Blanqui, he was appointed assistant professor and then director of studies. At the same time he published articles on political economy. In 1835 he became an editor at Le National. In 1838 he founded a vocational education center, which he managed until 1843. Garnier was one of the founders of the Journal des Economistes in 1841, of which he became director in 1845.

Joseph Garnier and his friends Adolphe-Gustave Blaise (1811–86) and Gilbert Guillaumin (1801–64) decided to form a society that would meet once a month to dine and discuss political economy. Organized in 1842 by Pellegrino Rossi, the first meeting of the Société d'économie politique with five people was held on 15 November including Blaise, Garnier, Guillaumin and Eugène Daire (1798–1847). The numbers grew with successive meetings. The society was open to men with very different positions in life and diverse political views, most of them influential either through their position or their writings. They could meet on neutral scientific grounds to exchange views on subjects such as the functions of the state, land rents, commercial freedom, public finances, the Crédit Foncier, regulations and socialism. The central theme was always political economy. Garnier was made permanent secretary of the Société d'Economie Politique.

In 1846 Garnier cofounded the short-lived Association pour la liberté des échanges, with others such as Frédéric Bastiat and Louis Wolowski. Also in 1846 he was named professor of political economy at the École des Ponts et Chaussées. He was one of the organizers of the Congress of Friends of Peace, held in Paris in 1849, Frankfurt in 1850 and London in 1851. He founded and directed the Nouveau Journal des Connaissances utiles (1853–1860) and contributed to the Dictionnaire de l'Economie Politique of Charles Coquelin and Gilbert-Urbain Guillaumin. Garnier was a member of almost all the societies of statistics and political economy of Europe.

Garnier ran for election in the supplementary elections of 1871, but did not succeed. In 1873 he was elected a member of the Académie des Sciences Morales et Politiques in place of Charles Dupin. Garnier was elected senator of Alpes-Maritimes on 30 January 1876 with 121 out of 207 voters. He sat on the left, and consistently voted with the Republicans until his death. Joseph Garnier died in Paris on 25 September 1881. He had been made a Knight of the Legion of Honour in August 1860.

== Publications ==
Besides his economic articles in the Presse, National, Siècle and Journal des Débats, Garnier published a great number of works. The best known include the Traité d'économie politique, which was often reprinted, his Traité de finances, the Annuaire d'économie politique et de statistique, which he published from 1844 to 1855 in collaboration with Guillaumin, a revised edition of Malthus and a Traité sur le principe de population.

- Fréd. Wantzel; Joseph Garnier (1838), Traité complet d'arithmétique théorique et pratique à l'usage des négocians, Paris: Renard, p. 536
- Adolphe Blanqui; Joseph Garnier (1841), Dictionnaire du commerce et des marchandises, contenant tout ce qui concerne le commerce de terre et de mer, Paris: Gilbert-Urbain Guillaumin
- Joseph Garnier (1846), Éléments de l'économie politique : exposé des notions fondamentales de cette science, Paris: Guillaumin, p. 368
- Joseph Garnier (1846), Richard Cobden, les ligueurs et la ligue, précis de l'histoire de la dernière révolution économique et financière en Angleterre, Paris: Guillaumin, p. 94
- Joseph Garnier (1846), Sur l'association, l'économie politique et la misère, position du problème de la misère, ou Considérations sur les moyens généraux d'élever les classes pauvres à une meilleure condition matérielle et morale, Paris: Guillaumin, p. 34
- Joseph Garnier (1847), Étude sur les profits et les salaires... Mémoire lu à l'Académie des sciences morales et politiques, Paris: Guillaumin, p. 47
- Joseph Garnier (1848), Le droit au travail, quelques mots d'explication et d'histoire : introduction à la discussion qui a eu lieu au sein de l'Assemblée nationale, Paris: Guillaumin, p. 20
- Joseph Garnier (1850), Congrès des amis de la paix universelle réuni à Paris en 1849; précédé d'une Note historique sur le mouvement en faveur de la paix, Paris: Guillaumin, p. 63
- Joseph Garnier (1857), Du Principe de population, Paris: Garnier frères, p. 353
- Joseph Garnier (1858), Notes et petits traités faisant suite aux Éléments de l'économie politique. Éléments de finances, suivis de : Éléments de statistique... et de notes diverses, Paris: Garnier frères, p. 474
- Joseph Garnier (1859), Manuel du capitaliste, ou Comptes faits des intérêts : Notice sur l'intérêt, l'escompte, etc.., Paris: Garnier frères, p. 474
- Joseph Garnier (1858), Abrégé des éléments de l'économie politique, ou Premières notions sur l'organisation de la société et sur la production, la répartition et l'emploi de la richesse individuelle et sociale, suivies d'un Vocabulaire des termes d'économie politique, de finances, etc., et de la Science du bonhomme Richard [par B. Franklin], Paris: Guillaumin, p. 380
- Joseph Garnier (1859), Traité des mesures métriques (mesures, poids, monnaies), exposé succinct et complet du système français métrique et décimal, avec une notice historique, Paris: Garnier frères, p. 142
- Joseph Garnier (1862), Traité de finances... notes historiques et documents statistiques (2 ed.), Paris: Garnier frères, p. 473
- Joseph Garnier (1864), Premières notions d'économie politique ou sociale, contenant : la Science du bonhomme Richard, par Benjamin Franklin; l'Économie politique en une leçon, par Frédéric Bastiat; Abrégé des éléments de l'économie politique et Vocabulaire de la langue économique, Paris: Garnier frères, p. 448
- Joseph Garnier (1865), Notes et petits traités, contenant : Éléments de statistique et opuscules divers, faisant suite aux Traités d'économie politique et de finances (2 ed.), Paris: Garnier frères, p. 573
- Joseph Garnier (1865), Notice sur M. Guillaumin, fondateur du "Journal des économistes", Paris: impr. de A. Parent, p. 20
- Joseph Garnier (1868), Association polytechnique. Cours d'économie industrielle... 6e série..., Paris
- Joseph Garnier (1873), Traité d'économie politique sociale ou industrielle : exposé didactique des principes et des applications de cette science et de l'organisation économique de la société (7 ed.), Paris: Garnier frères, p. 784
- Joseph Garnier (1875), Premières notions d'économie politique sociale ou industrielle (4 ed.), Paris: Garnier frères : Guillamin, p. 318
- Joseph Garnier (1880), Traité complet d'arithmétique théorique et appliquée au commerce, à la banque, aux finances et à l'industrie avec un traité des poids et mesures, un recueil de problèmes raisonnés et diverses notes et notices (3 ed.), Paris: Guillaumin : Garnier frères, p. 636
- Joseph Garnier (1885), Du principe de population, preface by Gustave de Molinari (2 augm. de nouvelles notes contenant les faits statistiques les plus récents et les débats relatifs à la question de la population ed.), Paris: Guillaumin, p. 552

== Sources ==
- Bitard (1878), "Joseph-Clément GARNIER", Dictionnaire général de biographie contemporaine (in French), archived from the original on 2014-05-03
- Garnier, Joseph (1852), "Économie Politique (Société d')", Dictionnaire de l'économie politique contenant l'exposition des principes de la science, l'opinion des écrivains qui ont le plus contribué a sa fondation et a ses progrés, la bibliographie générale de l'économie politique par noms d'auteurs et par ordre de matiéres, avec des notices biographiques et une appréciation raisonnée des principaux ouvrages: A-I, Meline, Cans
- Robert, Adolphe; Cougny, Gaston (1889), "GARNIER (JOSEPH-CLÉMENT)", Dictionnaire des parlementaires français (in French)
