= Le Globe =

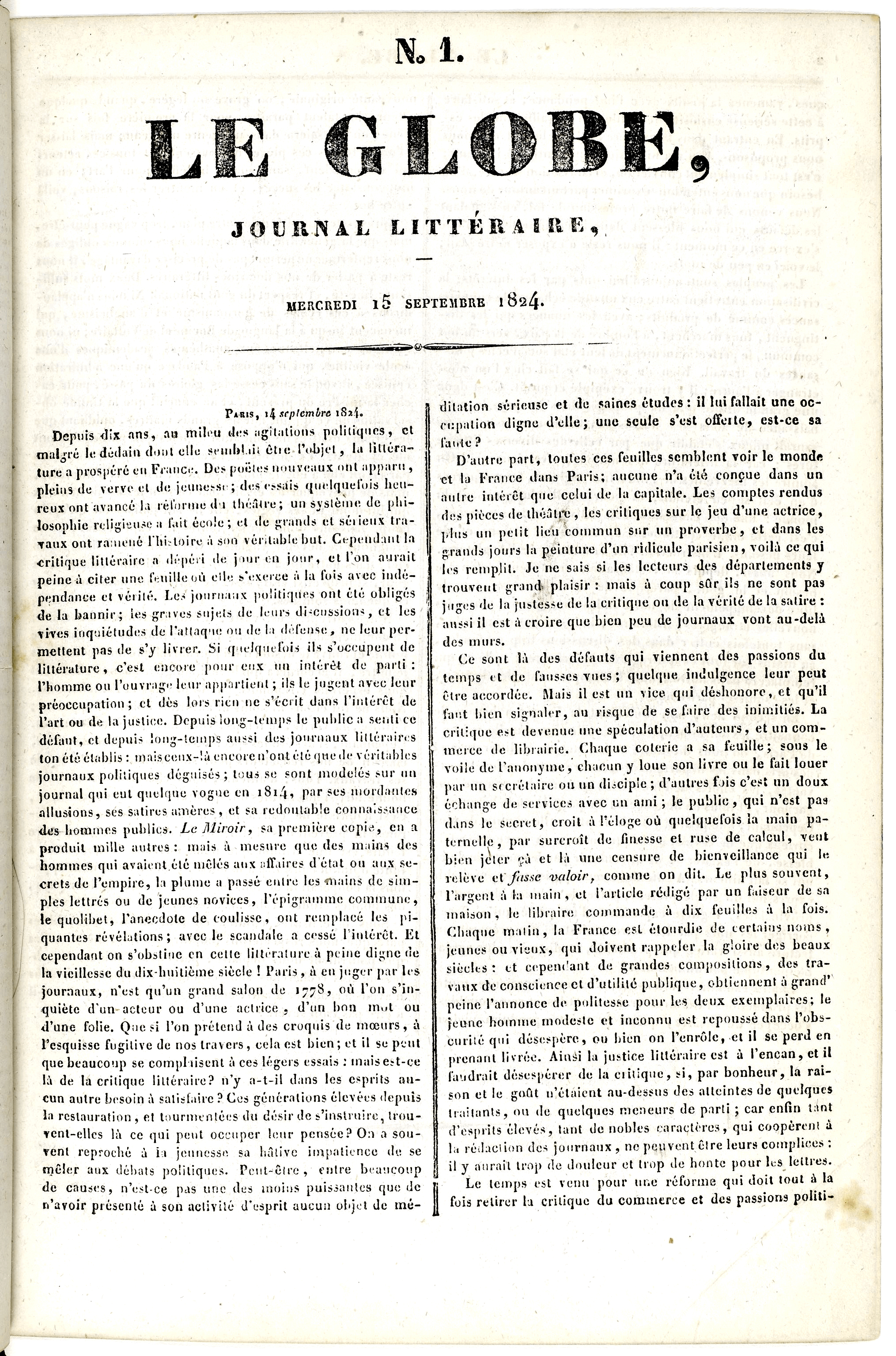
Le Globe-journal littéraire 15 sept 1824

Le Globe was a French newspaper, published in Paris by the Bureau du Globe between 1824 and 1832, and created with the goal of publishing Romantic creations. It was established by Pierre Leroux and the printer Alexandre Lachevardière. After 1828, the paper became political and Liberal in tone.

The Aide-toi, le ciel t'aidera association's organ was first Le Globe and then Le National. Charles Renouard was among the liberals who opposed the Bourbon Restoration. He was a member of the "Aide-toi" society and participated in the creation of the Globe. He was the lawyer for this journal, and contributed to it regularly from 1825 to 1827. Goethe was a regular subscriber from 1824 and declared it "among the most interesting periodicals" and that he "could not do without it."

The Saint-Simonists bought the newspaper in 1830, and was the official voice of the movement under the July Monarchy.

Le Globe is notably as the first French periodical to introduce the term socialism in 1832, marking the second major introduction of that term after the London Cooperative Magazine in the United Kingdom in 1827.

The newspaper was ultimately banned, following the denunciation of Saint-Simonianism as an anti-establishment "sect".

== Notable contributors ==
- Jean-Jacques Ampère
- Jean-Georges Farcy
- François Guizot
- Prosper Duvergier de Hauranne
- Charles Magnin
- Charles de Rémusat
- Charles Augustin Sainte-Beuve
- Ludovic Vitet
- Louis Viardot

=== Saint-Simonists ===
- Michel Chevalier
- Barthélemy Prosper Enfantin
- Charles Joseph Lambert
- Olinde Rodrigues

== Sources ==
- "Augustin-Charles RENOUARD", Controverses du XIXème Siècle sur la «Propriété Intellectuelle» (in French), MSH Paris-Nord, archived from the original on 18 June 2015
- Gilman, D. C.; Peck, H. T.; Colby, F. M., eds. (1905). "Aide-toi et le ciel t'aidera" . New International Encyclopedia. Vol. 1 (1st ed.). New York: Dodd, Mead.
- Robert, Adolphe; Cougny, Gaston (1889), "Renouard (Augustin, Charles)", dictionnaire des parlementaires français de 1789 à 1889 (in French)
