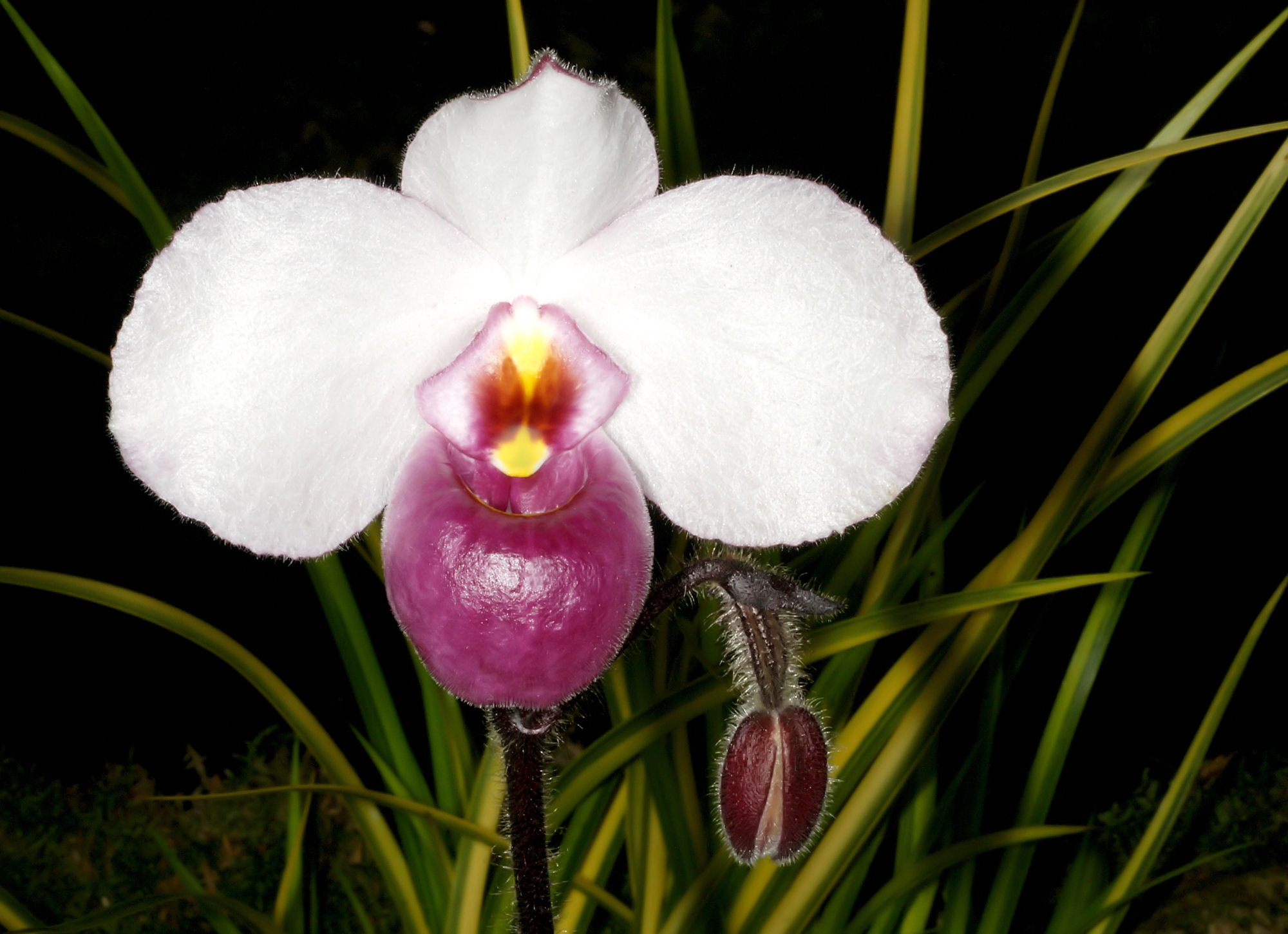
- Paphiopedilum delenatii

Scientific classification
- Kingdom: Plantae
- Clade: Tracheophytes
- Clade: Angiosperms
- Clade: Monocots
- Order: Asparagales
- Family: Orchidaceae
- Subfamily: Cypripedioideae
- Genus: Paphiopedilum
- Subgenus: Paphiopedilum subg. Parvisepalum; Karasawa & Saito (1982)

Type species
- Paphiopedilum delenatii

Species
- See text

= Paphiopedilum subg. Parvisepalum =

Subgenus of flowering plants

Paphiopedilum subgenus Parvisepalum is a subgenus of the genus Paphiopedilum.

== Distribution ==
Plants from this section are found from western China down to northern Vietnam.

== Species ==
Paphiopedilum subgenus Parvisepalum comprises the following species:

Image	Name	Distribution	Elevation (m)
	Paphiopedilum armeniacum S.C.Chen & F.Y.Liu 1982	China(Yunnan)	1,000–2,000 metres (3,300–6,600 ft)
	Paphiopedilum delenatii Guillaumin 1924	South Vietnam	600–1,300 metres (2,000–4,300 ft)
	Paphiopedilum emersonii Koopowitz & Cribb 1986	northern Vietnam, China ( Yunnan, Guangxi, and Guangdong)	460–750 metres (1,510–2,460 ft)
	Paphiopedilum hangianum Perner & Gruss 1999	China (Yunnan) and North Vietnam	460–760 metres (1,510–2,490 ft)
	Paphiopedilum malipoense S.C. Chen & Tsi 1984	China (Yunnan) and North Vietnam	570–160 metres (1,870–520 ft)
	Paphiopedilum micranthum S.C.Chen & Z.H.Tsi 1984	northern Vietnam and China (western and northern Guangxi, southeastern Yunnan and western Guizhou)	360–1,600 metres (1,180–5,250 ft)
	Paphiopedilum vietnamense O. Gruss & Perner 1999	Vietnam(Thái Nguyên province)	350–1,400 metres (1,150–4,590 ft)
