= Charles Renouard =

French lawyer and politician

Augustin Charles Renouard
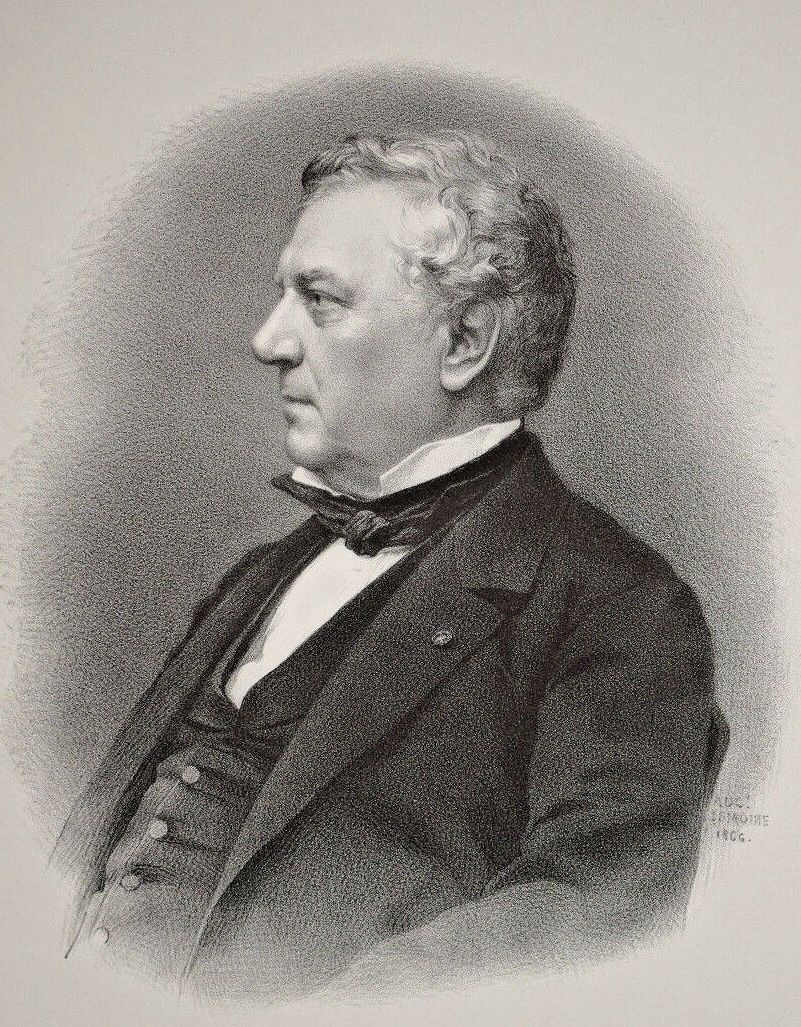

Deputy for Somme
- In office 5 July 1831 – 4 November 1837

Deputy for Somme
- In office 2 March 1839 – 12 June 1842

Senator for life
- In office 24 November 1876 – 17 August 1878
- Preceded by: Charles Letellier-Valazé

Personal details
- Born: 22 October 1794 Paris, France
- Died: 17 August 1878 (aged 83) Château de Stors, Paris, France
- Occupation: Politician

Augustin Charles Renouard (22 October 1794 – 17 August 1878) was a French lawyer and politician. During a long career he worked as an advocate, was a member of the chamber of deputies, was vice-president of Société d'économie politique, sat on the Court of Cassation and was a Senator. He published many books and articles, and was elected a member of the Académie des Sciences Morales et Politiques of the Institut de France. He made important contributions to the law on copyright, which he saw as a temporary monopoly granted to the author rather than a right of ownership.

== Early years ==
Augustin Charles Renouard was born on 22 October 1794 in Paris. His parents were Antoine-Augustin Renouard, a manufacturer of gauze, and Léonie-Catherine Desaintes. His father had left the gauze business to become a book seller and publisher, and expected Charles to follow a literary career. Renouard studied at the École Normale from 1812 to 1815. He followed the courses of Victor Cousin and Abel-François Villemain. He obtained a doctorate in letters in 1814. His French and Latin doctoral theses were on the style of the Hebrew prophets, and on personal identity.

Renouard became an assistant philosophy teacher (répétiteur). He then studied law and was admitted as an advocate. He obtain a licence as a lawyer in 1816 and practiced at the Paris bar. Some of his pleadings were published. He became secretary of the Société pour l’instruction élémentaire and the Société de morale chrétienne. Renouard was among the liberals who opposed the Bourbon Restoration. He participated in the creation of the Globe, was the lawyer for this journal, and contributed to it regularly from 1825 to 1827. He was a member of the "Aide-toi" society of François Guizot which supported liberal candidates in the 1827 elections.

Charles Renouard married Adèle Girard (1803–73) on 28 March 1821 in Paris. Their children were Alfred Augustin Renouard (1822–83), Pierre Renouard (1826–29) and Eugénie Renouard (1827–84).

== July Monarchy ==
After the July Revolution Renouard was appointed to the council of state and was made secretary general in the Ministry of Justice. On 6 July 1831 he was elected to the legislature as deputy for the 4th riding of the Somme department (Abbeville). He sat with the conservative majority. He was rapporteur on the 1833 bill on primary education. He was reelected on 21 June 1834. He was involved in discussions on the laws on primary education, defaults and bankruptcy. In 1837 he was appointed an adviser the Court of Cassation. He was reelected that year, but in the general elections of 4 November 1837 he failed to be reelected. On 2 March 1839 Renouard was reelected to the legislature. He was rapporteur on the May 1840 and March 1841 bills on child labour. On 9 July 1842 he failed to be elected.

The Société d'économie politique was founded on 1 February 1842 in Paris. The society was open to men with very different positions in life and diverse political views, most of them influential either through their position or their writings. They could meet on neutral scientific grounds to exchange views on subjects such as the functions of the state, land rents, commercial freedom, public finances, the Crédit Foncier, regulations and socialism. The central theme was always political economy. In 1845 the society elected two presidents (Charles Dunoyer and Hippolyte Passy), two vice-presidents (Horace Émile Say and Charles Renouard), a secretary (Joseph Garnier) and a quaestor (Gilbert Guillaumin). Renouard was made a Peer of France on 21 July 1846, and supported the government of Louis-Philippe in the Chamber of Peers until the February Revolution.

== Later career ==
During the coup d'état of 2 December 1851 Renouard was charged by the high court with drawing up the report on indicting President Bonaparte. Before he was able to render judgement on 3 December 1851 a commissioner entered the room and demanded that the judges separate. When Renouard said the High Court would only separate if forced to do so a picket of soldiers entered the court and forced the issue. Under the Second French Empire Renouard remained adviser to the Court of Cassation until 1869, when he became honorary adviser. During this period he divided his time between the court and the Société d'économie politique, of which he was one of the vice-presidents. In 1861 he was elected a member of the Académie des Sciences Morales et Politiques. He became vice-president of the academy in 1867 and president in 1868.

Under the French Third Republic, despite his age Renouard was named Attorney General at the Court of Cassation on 21 April 1871. In June 1876 he was proposed for a non-removable senator's seat, but failed to be elected. On 24 November 1876 he was elected as permanent senator in place of General Charles Letellier-Valazé, who had died. He sat with the left center and voted with the conservative republican party. On 16 May 1877 he opposed the government, and on 17 May 1877 resigned from his position as a magistrate. On 23 June 1877 he opposed the dissolution of the Chamber of Deputies. He was appointed president of the committee of judges who directed the campaign against the Fourtou-de Broglie ministry. He then supported the cabinet of Jules Armand Dufaure.

Charles Renouard died on 17 August 1878 in the Château de Stors, Seine-et-Oise. He was a Grand Officer of the Legion of Honour.

== Views on copyright ==
Throughout his life Renouard tried to formulate the law of intangible creation. He discussed this in his Traité des brevets d’invention (1825), Traité du droit des auteurs (1838–39), a completely revised version of the Traité des brevets d'invention (1844) and his Du Droit industriel (1860). He may have been the first to use the term "droit d’auteur" (copyright), and was certainly the first theoretician of this law and the main architect of its adoption into French law. He saw the rights of creators as different from a right of ownership. Rather than "literary and artistic property" he preferred "authors' and inventors' rights", which he saw as a grant of a temporary monopoly as a reward for the service the creator renders to society. Thus he ensured that the Salvandy commission of 1839 on "literary property" led to the law on the "rights of authors in their production in letters and the arts". Again, the act of 14 July 1866 on the rights of widows and children referred only to the "author's right". In a judgement of 22 July 1887 the Court of Cassation enshrined his doctrine by explicitly abandoning the theory of property and defining copyright as a "temporary exclusive privilege of commercial exploitation".

== Selected publications ==
Between 1819 and 1859 Renouard published many articles in Thémis, Revue encyclopédique, Globe, Revue de législation, Journal des économistes and Dictionnaire de l'économie politique. Other publications included:

- Augustin Charles Renouard (1815), Projet de quelques améliorations dans l'éducation publique
- Augustin Charles Renouard (1818), Éléments de la morale
- Augustin Charles Renouard (1824), Considérations sur les lacunes de l'éducation secondaire en France
- Augustin Charles Renouard (1824), Mélanges de morale, d'économie et de politique, extraits des ouvrages de Benjamin Franklin, et précédés d'une notice sur sa vie
- Augustin Charles Renouard (1825), Traité des brevets d'invention, de perfectionnement et d'importation; suivi d'un appendice contenant le texte des lois et règlements rendus en France; un précis de la législation anglaise; les lois des États-Unis de l'Amérique septentrionale et des Cortès d'Espagne
- Augustin Charles Renouard (1827), Examen du projet de loi contre la presse
- Augustin Charles Renouard (1828), Mémoires sur la vie de Benjamin Franklin, écrits par lui-même. Traduction nouvelle
- Augustin Charles Renouard (1834), l'Education doit elle être libre Mémoire sur la statistique de la justice civile en France
- Augustin Charles Renouard (1838–1839), Traité des droits d'auteur, dans la littérature, les sciences et les beaux-arts, vol. 1–2, Paris: J. Renouard
- Augustin Charles Renouard (1842), Traité des faillites et banqueroutes, vol. 1–2
- Augustin Charles Renouard (1844), Traité des brevets d'invention (entirely new ed.)
- Augustin Charles Renouard (1860), Du droit industriel dans ses rapports avec les principes du droit civil sur les personnes et sur les choses

== Sources ==
- Augustin, Charles Renouard (in French), Assemblée nationale
- "Augustin-Charles RENOUARD", Controverses du XIXème Siècle sur la «Propriété Intellectuelle» (in French), MSH Paris-Nord, archived from the original on 2015-06-18
- bourelly, "Augustin Charles Renouard", Geneanet (in French)
- Courtois, Alphonse (1846), "Notice historique", Annales de la Société d'économie politique (in French)
- Garnier, Joseph (1852), "Économie Politique (Société d')", Dictionnaire de l'économie politique contenant l'exposition des principes de la science, l'opinion des écrivains qui ont le plus contribué a sa fondation et a ses progrés, la bibliographie générale de l'économie politique par noms d'auteurs et par ordre de matiéres, avec des notices biographiques et une appréciation raisonnée des principaux ouvrages: A-I, Meline, Cans
- "RENOUARD (Augustin-Charles)". Biographie dans le Grand Larousse Universel du XIX° siècle.
- Robert, Adolphe; Cougny, Gaston (1889), "Renouard (Augustin, Charles)", dictionnaire des parlementaires français de 1789 à 1889 (in French)
- Société d'économie politique. France. 1847–... (in French), BnF: Bibliotheque nationale de France
