= Gilbert-Urbain Guillaumin =

French publisher (1801–1864)

Gilbert-Urbain Guillaumin (14 August 1801, Couleuvre – 15 December 1864, Paris) was a French publisher who campaigned for liberalism.

== Personal life ==
Orphaned at five years old, he was raised by a strict uncle whom he left to start his life in Paris in 1819. He began as an employee at a hardware store before founding his bookshop, and then starting a publishing house.

He raised two daughters alone, having been left a widower early.

== Édition Guillaumin ==
Guillaumin specialised in the first place in literature and history. He completely abandoned this approach which did not permit him to cover his expenses.

He specialised next in economics and in 1835 started to publish the Dictionnaire du commerce et des marchancises. In 1840, he started the Collection des principaux économistes, which contained the works of the founders of the science of liberal economics, such as Turgot, Adam Smith and Jean-Baptiste Say. Thus he was one of the leaders of a pressure group that campaigned in favour of a liberal free trade. In 1841, he edited the first issue of the Journal des économistes that would be a reference for political economy for the rest of the 19th century. The following year, he was one of the founders of a liberal learned society, the Société d'économie politique. It was part of his office; he was the questor from 1845.

His publishing house published most of the liberal economists of the 19th century, such as Frédéric Bastiat, Gustave de Molinari ou encore Charles Coquelin. Henri Baudrillart said about him that he was the centre and the bond of the French liberal school, and Richard Cobden affirmed that he was the centre of rallying friends of the science of economics. The publisher allied itself with the scientific and medical publisher Victor Masson to publish the first French edition of Charles Darwin's On the Origin of Species translated by Clémence Royer.

In 1910, the publishing house merged with that of Félix Alcan.

== Bibliography ==
- Lucette le Van-Lemesle, Le juste ou le riche: L’enseignement de l’économie politique 1815-1950, Institut de la gestion publique et du développement économique, 2004 ( Read online )
- Lucette Le Van-Lemesle, Guillaumin, éditeur d'économie politique, 1801–1864, Revue d'économie politique, n°2, 1985, p. 134–149
- Luc Marco, "Genèse du risque éditorial: la comptabilité à l'époque romantique dans le fonds des libraires du commerce", Management & Avenir, 2011/1 (n° 41), p. 124-139 ( Read online ).
- Joseph Garnier, "Guillaumin, ses funérailles, sa vie et son œuvre", dans le Journal des économistes, janvier 1865, p. 108-121 ( Read online )
