= Fedor Kapelyush =

Russian writer

Fedor Davidovich Kapelyush (Russian: Федор Давидович Капелюш; 1876–1945), was a Russian engineer, economist, writer, Marxist, and translator.

He had an engineering education, was the author of publications on economic and socio-political topics, and participated in translations into Russian of the works of K. Kautsky, K. Marx, J. Meslier and a number of other social writers.

== Books ==
- Экономика и религия (Economy and Religion) / Ф. Капелюш. - Москва; Ленинград : Гос. изд-во, 1927 (Л. : тип. Печатный двор). - 141 с., 3 с. объявл.;
- Фунт и доллар : Англия и Америка в борьбе за главенство на мировом денежном рынке (Pound and Dollar: England and America in the Struggle for Supremacy in the Global Money Market) / Ф. Капелюш. - Москва : Экономическая жизнь, 1925. - 121 с. : табл.;
- Австрия (Austria) / Ф. Капелюш. - Москва; Ленинград : Московский рабочий, 1929 (7-я тип. "Искра революции" Мосполиграфа). - 231 с., [1] с. объявл. : карт.;
- Религия раннего капитализма. (Religion of Early Capitalism) / Ф. Капелюш; Центр. совет Союза воинствующих безбожников СССР. - Москва : Безбожник, 1931 (тип. "Гудок"). - 280 с., [1] с. объявл.;
- Религиозные войны Средневековья : Пояснительный текст к серии диапозитивов (Religious Wars of the Middle Ages: Explanatory Text for a Series of Slides)/ Автор Ф.Д. Капелюш; ред. проф. С.Г. Лозинский Центр. Сов. Союза воинствующих безбожников СССР. - Москва : Б. и., 1940 (тип. "Диафото"). - 26 с.;

== Translations ==
- Каутский, Карл. «Этика и исторический материализм» / Пер. с нем. Ф. Капелюша; К. Каутский. - Лейпциг; Санкт-Петербург : Мысль, 1906. - 91 с.;
- Гофман, Адольф. «"Десять заповедей" и имущие классы» : С письмом к авт. Клары Цеткин по поводу этой брош. / А. Гоффман; Пер. с 10 нем. изд. Ф. Капелюша. - Лейпциг; Санкт-Петербург : "Мысль" А. Миллер, 1906 (Санкт-Петербург). - 61 с.;
- Гюйо, Ив. «Социальные учения христианства» / Ив. Гюйо; Пер. с послед. доп. фр. изд. Ф. Капелюша. - Лейпциг; Санкт-Петербург : "Мысль", А. Миллер, 1907 (Одесса). - VIII, 231 с.;
- Прудон, Пьер Жозеф. «Что такое собственность?» : 1 мемуар, 2 мемуар. Исследование принципа права и правительства. Письмо к Бланки о собственности : С портр. авт. / Пер. с новейш. фр. изд. Ф. Капелюша; [П.-Ж. Прудон]. - Лейпциг; Санкт-Петербург : "Мысль" А. Миллер, 1907 (Санкт-Петербург). - [4], 253 с.;
- Маркс, Карл. «Классовая борьба во Франции от 1848 до 1850 г.» / С введ. Фридриха Энгельса; Пер. с нем. Ф. К[апелюша]. - Санкт-Петербург : тип. "Герольд", ценз. 1905. - XXIV, 118 с.; 19. - (Библиотека Марии Малых; No. 59-60).
- Вундт, Макс. «Греческое мировоззрение» / Макс Вундт; Пер. с нем. Ф.Д. Капелюша; Под ред. М.Н. Шварца. - Петроград : Огни, 1916. - VIII, 166 с.;
- Лейхтер О. «Хозяйственный учет в социалистическом обществе» / Отто Лейхтер; Пер. с нем. под ред. Ф.Капелюша С предисл. С.Струмилина. - М. : Экон. жизнь, 1926. - 92 с.;
- Файлер А. «Америка и Европа» / Артур Файлер; Пер. с нем. Ф.Капелюша и Н.Миркина Предисл. Ю.Ларина. - М.; Л. : Гос. изд-во, 1926. - 174 с.
