= Aide-toi, le ciel t'aidera =

Help yourself Aide-toi
- President: François Guizot
- Founder: Ludovic Vitet
- Founded: February 24, 1824
- Dissolved: 1832
- Headquarters: Salon de Paraveay, Paris
- Membership (1827): 100,000
- Ideology: Populism; Internal factions: • Jacobinism • Liberalism • Orleanism
- Political position: Left-wing
- Colours: Red, white

Aide-toi, le ciel t'aidera (French idiom, meaning "God helps those who help themselves"; literally, "Help yourself, heaven shall help you"), simply called Aide-toi, was a French society that aimed to stir up the electorate against the government during the Bourbon Restoration (1814–1830).

== History ==
The term "Aide-toi, le ciel t'aidera" began to be used by some political writers around 1824, and became the motto and title of the Aide-toi society. The purpose was to create opposition to the government by strictly legitimate means, mainly letters and political journals. The founders and active members were mostly from the Doctrinaires party, including François Guizot, who was president for some time, Tanneguy Duchâtel, Prosper Duvergier de Hauranne, Paul-François Dubois, Charles de Rémusat, Adolphe Thiers and Éléonore-Louis Godefroi Cavaignac.

The association's organ was first Le Globe and then Le National. Charles Renouard was among the liberals who opposed the Bourbon Restoration. He was a member of the "Aide-toi" society and participated in the creation of the Globe. He was the lawyer for this journal, and contributed to it regularly from 1825 to 1827.

Although intimate with Lafayette and others, the lawyer Odilon Barrot (1797–1877) took no share in their schemes for the overthrow of the government, but in 1827 joined the Aide-toi association. Aide-toi supported liberal candidates in the 1827 elections. The society was very influential in causing the July Revolution in 1830. It gave a banquet presided over by Barrot for the 221 deputies who had signed the address of March 1830 to Charles X, and threatened to reply to force by force. The society was allowed at first by the new government, but was dissolved in 1832.

== Steering committees ==
First committee
- Jean Philibert Damiron
- Desclozeaux, Desloges
- Paul-François Dubois
- Tanneguy Duchâtel
- Prosper Duvergier de Hauranne
- Joubert
- Lerminier
- Marchais
- Paravey
- Charles de Rémusat,
- Charles Renouard
- Auguste Sautelet
- Ludovic Vitet
Second committee
- Jules Bastide
- Éloy-Ernest Forestier de Boinvilliers
- Dejean
- Paul-François Dubois
- Tanneguy Duchâtel
- Prosper Duvergier de Hauranne
- François Guizot
- Joubert
- Lerminier
- Marchais
- Paravey
- Charles de Rémusat
- Ludovic Vitet
Third committee (from the advent of the Martignac ministry)
- Odilon Barrot,
- Jules Bastide
- Boinvilliers
- Éléonore-Louis Godefroi Cavaignac
- Chevallon
- Decruzy
- Gyunard
- Lamy
- Paul-Eugène Lanjuinais
- Marchais
- Taschereau
- Thomas.
Fourth committee (in July 1830)
- Odilon Barrot
- Jules Bastide
- J. Bernard
- Berville, Boinvilliers
- Godefroi Cavaignac
- Chevallon
- Corcelles
- Decruzy
- Gassicourt
- Guizot
- Lamy
- Lanjuinais
- Marchais
- Eusèbe de Salverte
- Taschereau
- Thomas
Fifth committee (from August 1830)
- Odilon Barrot
- Jules Bastide
- Boinvilliers
- Godefroi Cavaignac
- Chevallon
- Decruzy
- Guinard
- Lamy
- Lanjuinais
- Emmanuel, comte de Las Cases
- E. Lebreton
- Marchais
- E. Salverte
- Taschereau
- Ch. Teste
- Thomas
- Tonnet

== Sources ==
- "Augustin-Charles RENOUARD", Controverses du XIXème Siècle sur la «Propriété Intellectuelle» (in French), MSH Paris-Nord, archived from the original on 2015-06-18
- Chisholm, Hugh, ed. (1911). "Barrot, Camille Hyacinthe Odilon" . Encyclopædia Britannica (11th ed.). Cambridge University Press. which in turn cites:
  - Odilon Barrot, Mémoires (edited by Duvergier de Hauranne), 4 vols., 1875–1876. His personal relations with Louis Philippe and Napoleon, with his views on the events in which he was concerned, are described here.
  - Thureau-Dangin, Hist. de la monarchie de juillet
- Gilman, D. C.; Peck, H. T.; Colby, F. M., eds. (1905). "Aide-toi et le ciel t'aidera" . New International Encyclopedia. Vol. 1 (1st ed.). New York: Dodd, Mead.
- Robert, Adolphe; Cougny, Gaston (1889), "Renouard (Augustin, Charles)", dictionnaire des parlementaires français de 1789 à 1889 (in French)
