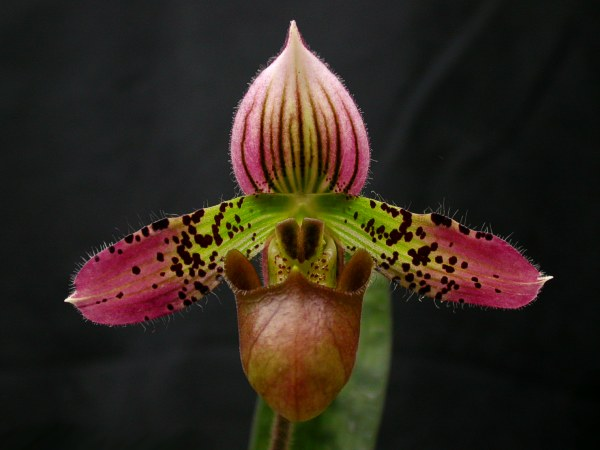

Scientific classification
- Kingdom: Plantae
- Clade: Tracheophytes
- Clade: Angiosperms
- Clade: Monocots
- Order: Asparagales
- Family: Orchidaceae
- Subfamily: Cypripedioideae
- Genus: Paphiopedilum
- Species: P. acmodontum

Binomial name
- Paphiopedilum acmodontum M.W.Wood

= Paphiopedilum acmodontum =

Species of orchid

Paphiopedilum acmodontum, or the pointed tooth paphiopedilum, is a species of plant in the family Orchidaceae. It is endemic to the Philippines, specifically to Negros. The species has been subjected to various cultivation leading to a wide range of hybrids.

== Taxonomy ==
P. acmodontum was firstly described by M. W. Wood in 1976, after discovery in the end of the 1960s. The epithet of P. acmodontum was based on Greek akme, ("pointed"), and Latin dentium, ("tooth"), referring to its pointed tip at the labellum apex.

== Description ==
P. acmodontum can be described as a small, semi-terrestrial evergreen orchid that grows up to 50 centimetres (20 in) in both height and width, with 2–5 years for maximum growth. The elliptic leaves of P. acmodontum are up to 18 centimetres (7.1 in) in length and up to 4 centimetres (1.6 in) wide, with above mottled pale and dark green in colour, and ciliate basal margins. Its Inflorescence can grow up to 35 centimetres (14 in) long, being green with purple-spotting and sparsely pubescent. The orchid consists of a single flower that blooms up to 7–11 centimetres (2.8–4.3 in) wide. P. acmodontum can be grown in a temperate climate.

== Distribution ==
P. acmodontum is endemic to the Philippines, specifically the southern part of the Negros island at the Visayas, residing in elevations of 1,000–1,500 metres (3,300–4,900 ft), with mean temperature range of 20–22 °C (68–72 °F).

== Cultivation ==
Numerous hybrids were cultivated with P. acmodontum, such as acmodontum × niveum ("White Madonna"), acmodontum × delenatii ("Beauty Delight"), and acmodontum × bellatulum ("Doctor Jane").
