= Guillaumin =

Guillaumin is a French surname. Notable people with the surname include:

- André Guillaumin (1885–1974), French botanist
- Armand Guillaumin (1842–1927), French impressionist painter and lithographer
- Claude Guillaumin (1842–1927), French painter and caricaturist
- Colette Guillaumin (1934–2017), French sociologist
- Gilbert-Urbain Guillaumin (1801–1864), French publisher
