= Clémence Royer =

French philosopher and scholar

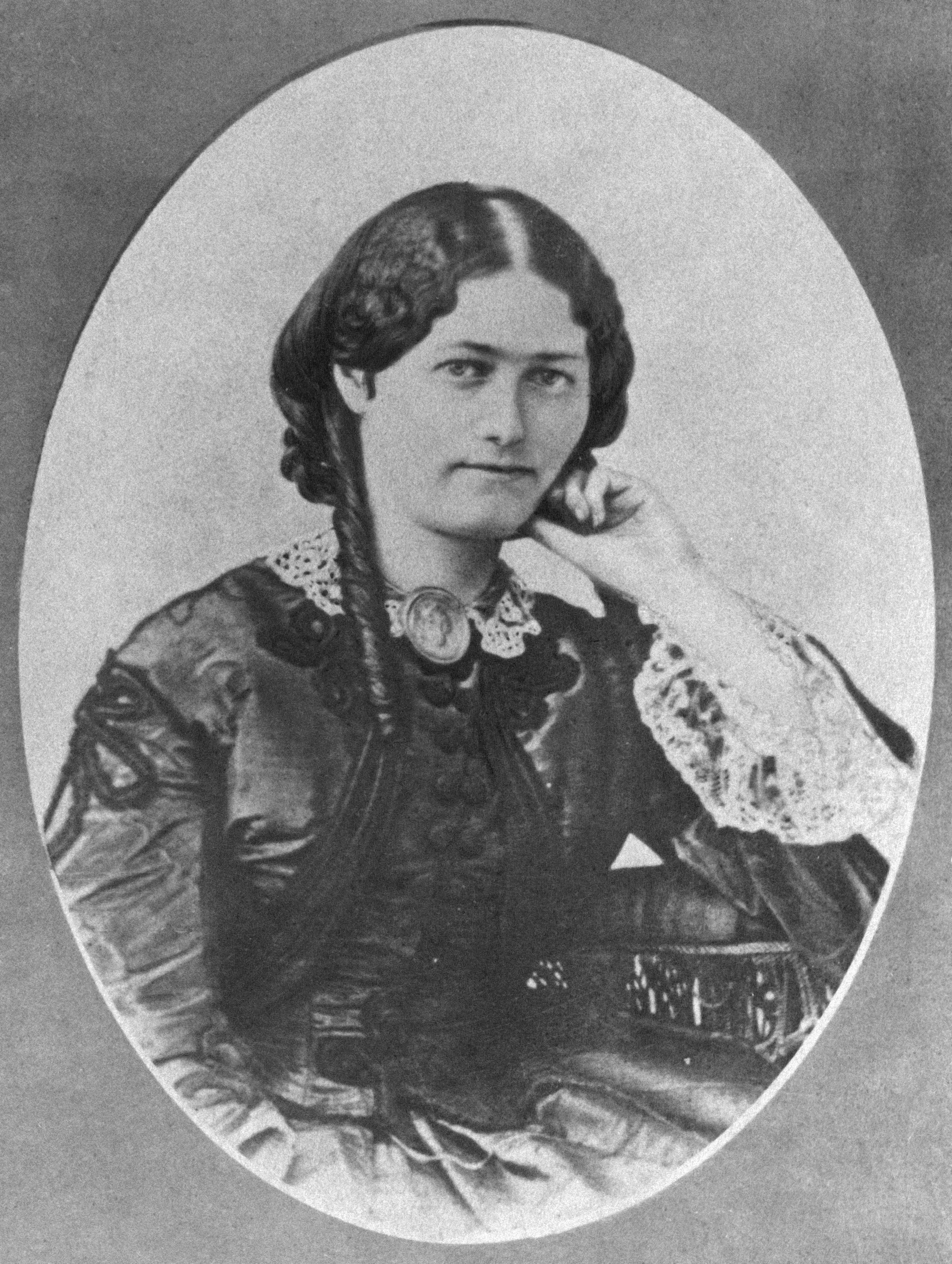
- Photograph of Clémence Royer taken by Félix Nadar in 1865.
- Born: 21 April 1830; Nantes, France
- Died: 6 February 1902 (aged 71); Neuilly-sur-Seine, France

Clémence Royer (21 April 1830 – 6 February 1902) was a self-taught French scholar who lectured and wrote on economics, philosophy, science and feminism. She is best known for her controversial 1862 French translation of Charles Darwin's On the Origin of Species.

== Early life ==
Augustine-Clémence Audouard was born on 21 April 1830 in Nantes, Brittany, the only daughter of Augustin-René Royer and Joséphine-Gabrielle Audouard. When her parents married seven years later her name was changed to Clémence-Auguste Royer. Her mother was a seamstress from Nantes while her father came from Le Mans and was an army captain and a royalist legitimist. After the failure of a rebellion in 1832 to restore the Bourbon monarchy the family were forced to flee to Switzerland where they spent 4 years in exile before returning to Orléans. There her father gave himself up to the authorities and was tried for his part in the rebellion but was eventually acquitted.

Royer was mainly educated by her parents until the age of 10 when she was sent to the Sacré-Coeur convent school in Le Mans. She became very devout but was unhappy and spent only a short time at the school before continuing her education at home. When she was 13 she moved with her parents to Paris. As a teenager she excelled at needlework and enjoyed reading plays and novels. She was an atheist.

Her father separated from her mother and returned to live in his native village in Brittany, leaving mother and daughter to live in Paris. She was 18 at the time of 1848 revolution and was greatly influenced by the republican ideas and abandoned her father's political beliefs. When her father died a year later, she inherited a small piece of property. The next 3 years of her life were spent in self-study which enabled her to obtain diplomas in arithmetic, French and music, qualifying her to work as a teacher in a secondary school.

In January 1854 when aged 23 she took up a teaching post at a private girls' school in Haverfordwest in south Wales. She spent a year there before returning to France in the spring of 1855 where she taught initially at a school in Touraine and then in the late spring of 1856 at a school near Beauvais. According to her autobiography, it was during this period that she began to seriously question her Catholic faith. Ernest Renan called Royer "almost a man of genius" reflecting the bias of the 19th century that a woman could not be called a genius.

== Lausanne ==
In June 1856 Royer abandoned her career as a teacher and moved to Lausanne in Switzerland where she lived on the proceeds of the small legacy that she had received from her father. She borrowed books from the public library and spent her time studying, initially on the origins of Christianity and then on various scientific topics.

In 1858, inspired by a public lecture given by the Swedish novelist Frederika Bremer, Royer gave a series of 4 lectures on logic which were open only to women. These lectures were very successful. At about this time she began meeting a group of exiled French freethinkers and republicans in the town. One of these was Pascal Duprat, a former French deputy living in exile, who taught political science at the Académie de Lausanne (later the university) and edited two journals. He was 15 years older than Royer and married with a child. He was later to become her lover and the father of her son.

She began to assist Duprat with his journal Le Nouvel Économiste and he encouraged her to write. He also helped her to advertise her lectures. When she began another series of lectures for women, this time on natural philosophy in the winter of 1859–1860, Duprat's Lausanne publisher printed her first lecture Introduction to the Philosophy of Women. This lecture provides an early record of her thoughts and her attitudes to the role of women in society. Duprat soon moved with his family to Geneva but Royer continued to write reviews of books for his journal and herself lived in Geneva for a period during the winter of 1860–1861.

When in 1860 the Swiss canton of Vaud offered a prize for the best essay on income tax, Royer wrote a book describing both the history and the practice of the tax which was awarded second prize. Her book was published in 1862 with the title Théorie de l'impôt ou la dîme social. It included a discussion on the economic role of women in society and the obligation of women to produce children. It was through this book that she first became known outside Switzerland.

In the spring of 1861 Royer visited Paris and gave a series of lectures. These were attended by the Countess Marie d'Agoult who shared many of Royer's republican views. The two women became friends and started corresponding with Royer sending long letters enclosing articles that she had written for the Journal des Économistes.

== Translation of On the Origin of Species ==
=== First edition ===
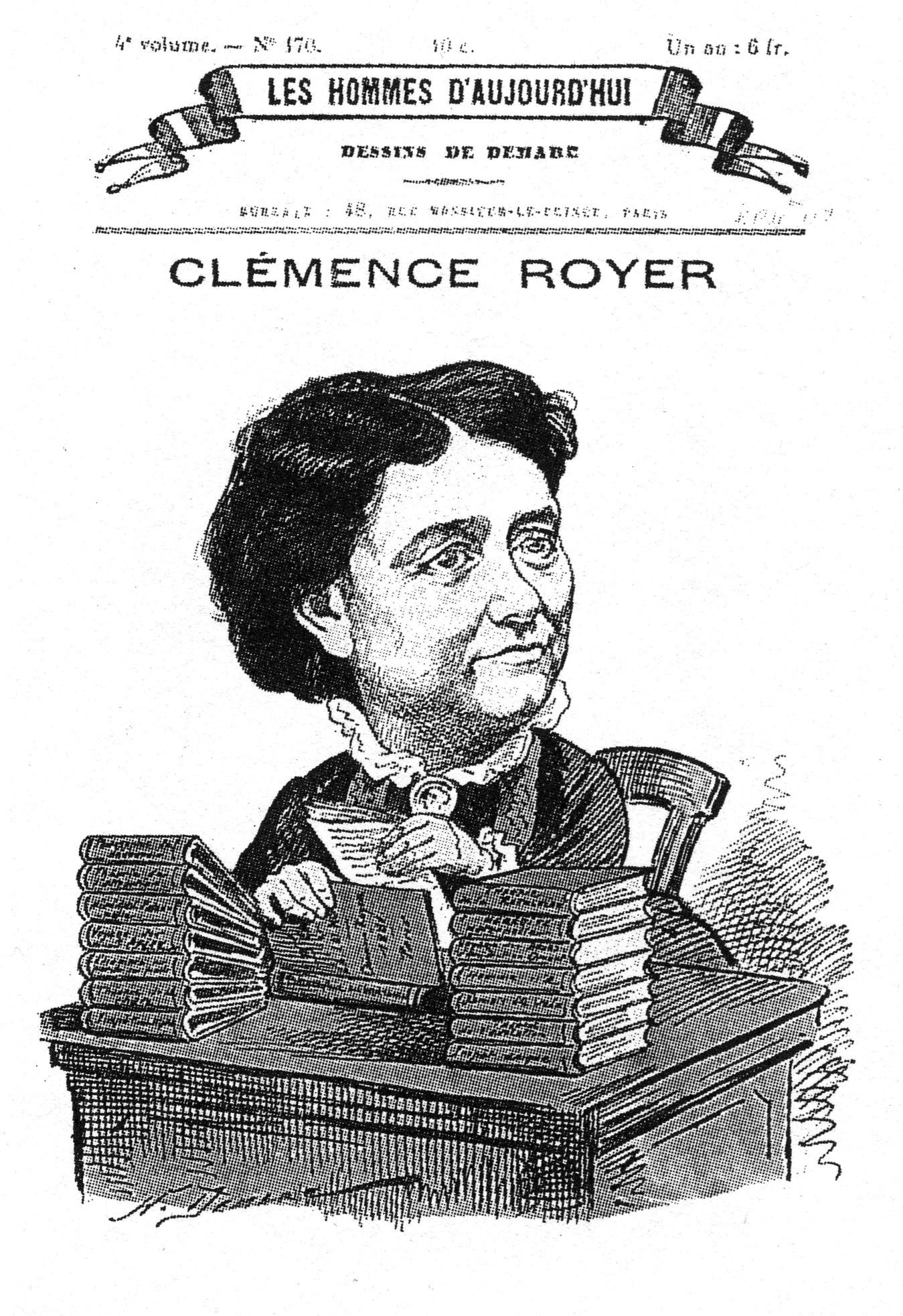
Caricature of Clémence Royer from Les Hommes d'aujourd'hui published in 1881.

It is not known exactly how the arrangement was made for Royer to translate Charles Darwin's On the Origin of Species. Darwin was anxious to have his book published in French. His first choice of translator had been Louise Belloc, but she had declined his offer as she considered the book to be too technical. Darwin had been approached by the Frenchman Pierre Talandier but Talandier had been unable to find a publisher to handle the book. Royer was familiar with the writings of Jean-Baptiste Lamarck and Thomas Malthus and realized the significance of Darwin's work. She was also probably helped by having close links with a French publisher, Gilbert-Urbain Guillaumin. We know from a letter dated 10 Sep 1861 that Darwin asked his English publisher Murray to send a copy of the third edition of the Origin to "Mlle Clémence-Auguste Royer 2. Place de la Madeline Lausanne Switzerland; as she has agreed with a publisher for a French translation". René-Édouard Claparède, a Swiss naturalist who lectured at the University of Geneva and who had favourably reviewed the Origin for the Revue Germanique, offered to help her with the technicalities of the biology.

Royer went beyond her role as a translator and included a long (60 page) preface and detailed explanatory footnotes. In her preface she challenged the belief in religious revelation and discussed the application of natural selection to the human race and what she saw as the negative consequences of protecting the weak and the infirm. These eugenic ideas were to gain her notoriety. The preface also promoted her concept of progressive evolution which had more in common with the ideas of Lamarck than with those of Darwin. In June 1862, soon after Darwin received a copy of the translation he wrote in a letter to the American botanist, Asa Gray:

I received 2 or 3 days ago a French translation of the Origin by a Madelle. Royer, who must be one of the cleverest & oddest women in Europe: is ardent deist & hates Christianity, & declares that natural selection & the struggle for life will explain all morality, nature of man, politicks &c &c!!!. She makes some very curious & good hits, & says she shall publish a book on these subjects, & a strange production it will be.

However, Darwin appears to have had doubts as a month later in a letter to the French zoologist Armand de Quatrefages he wrote: "I wish the translator had known more of Natural History; she must be a clever, but singular lady; but I never heard of her, till she proposed to translate my book." He was unhappy with Royer's footnotes and in a letter to the botanist Joseph Hooker he wrote: "Almost everywhere in Origin, when I express great doubt, she appends a note explaining the difficulty or saying that there is none whatever!! It is really curious to know what conceited people there are in the world,..."

=== Second and third editions ===
For the second edition of the French translation published in 1866, Darwin suggested some changes and corrected some errors. The words "des lois du progrès" (laws of progress) were removed from the title to more closely follow the English original. Royer had originally translated "natural selection" by "élection naturelle" but for the new edition this was changed to "sélection naturelle" with a footnote explaining that although "élection" was the French equivalent of the English "selection", she was adopting the incorrect "sélection" to conform with the usage in other publications. In his article in Revue Germanique Claparède had used the word "élection" with a footnote explaining that the element of choice conveyed by the word was unfortunate but had he used "sélection" he would have created a neologism. In the new edition Royer also toned down her eugenic statements in the preface but added a foreword championing freethinkers and complaining about the criticism she had received from the Catholic press.

Royer published a third edition without contacting Darwin. She removed her foreword but added an additional preface in which she directly criticised Darwin's idea of pangenesis introduced in his Variation of Animals and Plants under Domestication (1868). She also made a serious error by failing to update her translation to reflect the changes that Darwin had incorporated in the 4th and 5th English editions. When Darwin learnt of this he wrote to the French publisher Reinwald and to the naturalist Jean-Jaques Moulinié in Geneva who had translated Variation to arrange for a new translation of his 5th edition of the Origin. In November 1869 Darwin wrote to Hooker:

I must enjoy myself and tell you about Madame C. Royer who translated the Origin into French and for which 2d edition I took infinite trouble. She has now just brought out a 3d edition without informing me so that all the corrections to the 4th and 5th editions are lost. Besides her enormously long and blasphemous preface to the 1st edition she has added a 2nd preface abusing me like a pick-pocket for pangenesis which of course has no relation to Origin. Her motive being, I believe, because I did not employ her to translate "Domestic animals". So I wrote to Paris; & Reinwald agrees to bring out at once a new translation for the 5th English Edition in Competition with her 3e edition — So shall I not serve her well? By the way this fact shows that "evolution of species" must at last be spreading in France.

In spite of Darwin's misgivings, he wrote to Moulinié suggesting that he should carefully study Royer's translation. Publication of the new edition was delayed by the Franco-Prussian War, the Paris Commune and by the death in 1872 of Moulinié. When the new French translation finally appeared in 1873 it included an appendix describing the additions made to the sixth English edition which had been published the previous year.

== Italy, Duprat and motherhood ==
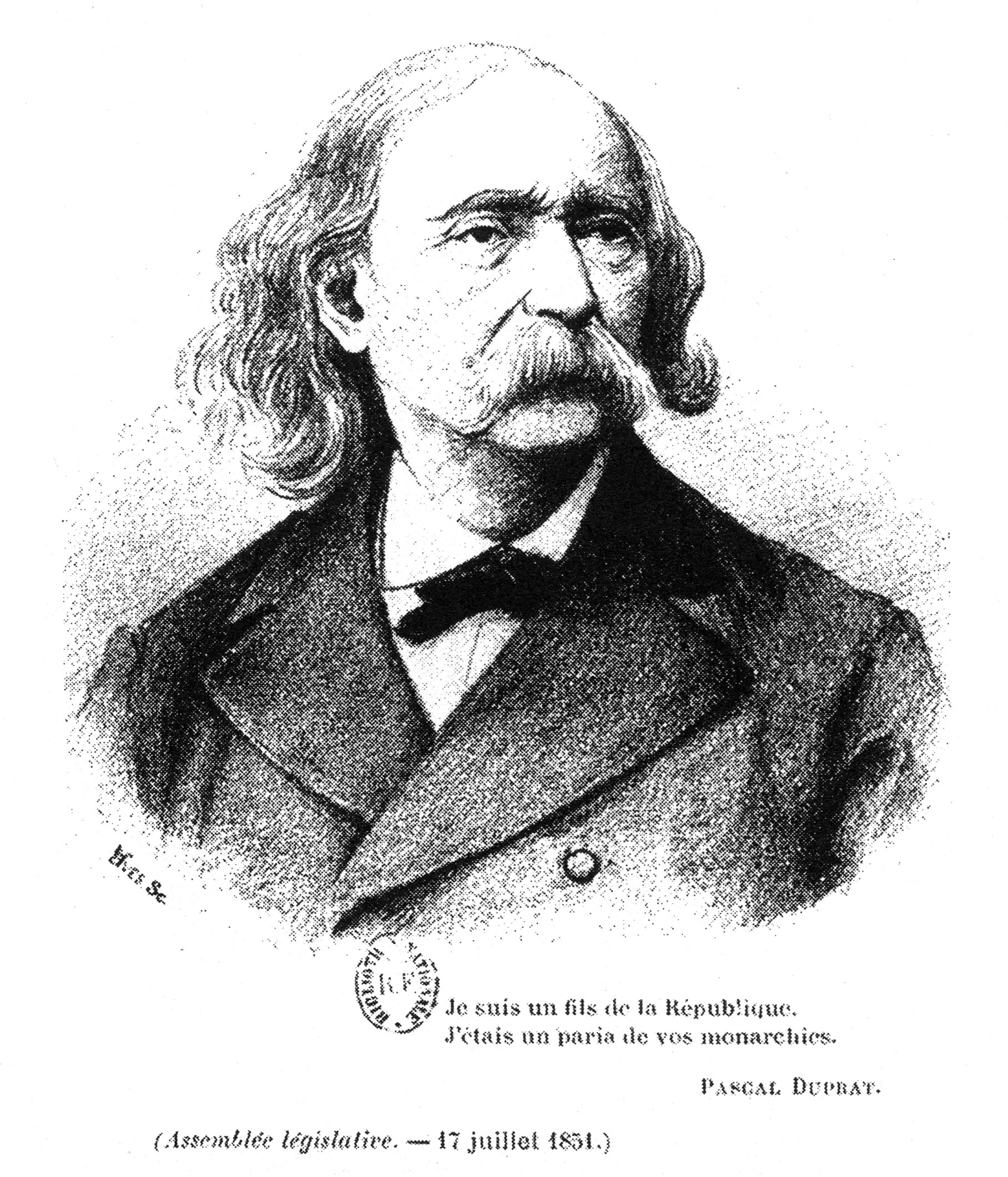
Portrait ca. 1880 of Pascal Duprat (1815–1885).

Royer's translation of On the Origin of Species led to public recognition. She was now much in demand to give lectures on Darwinism and spent the winter of 1862-1863 lecturing in Belgium and the Netherlands. She also worked on her only novel Les Jumeaux d'Hellas, a long melodramatic story set in Italy and Switzerland, which was published in 1864 to no great acclaim. She continued to review books and report on social-science meetings for the Journal des Économistes. During this period she would regularly meet up with Duprat at various European meetings.

In August 1865 Royer returned from Lausanne to live in Paris while Duprat, proscribed by the Second Empire, joined her and secretly shared her apartment. Three months later in December they went to live together openly in Florence (then the capital of Italy) where her only son, René, was born on 12 March 1866. With a small child to care for she could no longer easily travel but she continued to write, contributing to various journals and publishing a series of three articles on Jean-Baptiste Lamarck. She also worked on a book on the evolution of human society, L'origine de l'homme et des sociétés, published in 1870. This was a subject that Darwin had avoided in On the Origin of Species but was to address in The Descent of Man, and Selection in Relation to Sex published a year later.

In it, she expressed her views that the struggle for existence was inescapable, between not only separate species but individuals and groups within the same species. Royer felt this was especially acute in so-called "savage" societies, contra the rosier view of Rousseau. She argued human biology and society had evolved from that time progressively to higher stages. Inequality, she felt, was innate due to differing evolution, with some races definitely higher than others in ability as a result. She argued it was perfectly right for superior races to wage war on and exterminate lesser ones, unless the latter had some usefulness as laborers. Although she conceded that races mixing could be beneficial, Royer felt this generally immoral. Within and between advanced societies though Royer opposed waging war, seeing competition there taking a more peaceful form, but she did not go into detail on it.

Royer advocated maximal liberty to aid natural selection, since then individuals would be free to adapt and thus advance humanity. Simultaneously though, she opposed egalitarian schemes of any kind, along with charity or welfare that would keep the "unfit" alive. However, in spite of her generally anti-egalitarian views, Royer did maintain that there was no biological basis of patriarchy, seeing women's subordinate position as an only an aberration from original equality between genders that she believed had prevailed. A society that denied women's participation in full, she felt, would fall behind others which allowed it, and thus go against its own interests. Royer supported anti-religious and anti-clerical views as well by arguing that religion (particularly Christianity) stifled this progress. She has been characterized as an early leading Social Darwinist in Europe due to these views, which Royer termed a "semiotics of nature".

At the end of 1868 Duprat left Florence to report on the Spanish revolution for the Journal des Économistes, and in 1869, with the relaxing of the political climate at the end of the Second Republic, Royer returned to Paris with her son. The move would allow her mother to help with raising her child.

== Paris and the Société d'Anthropologie ==
Although Darwin had withdrawn his authorization for Royer's translation of his book, she continued to champion his ideas and on her arrival in Paris resumed giving public lectures on evolution. Darwin's ideas had made very little impact on French scientists and very few publications mentioned his work. A commonly expressed view was that there was no proof of evolution and Darwin had not offered any new evidence. In 1870, Royer became the first woman in France elected to a scientific society when she was elected to the prestigious all-male Société d'Anthropologie de Paris, founded and headed by Paul Broca. Its membership included many leading French anthropologists. Although the society included free-thinking republicans such as Charles Jean-Marie Letourneau and anthropologist Gabriel de Mortillet, Royer was nominated for membership by the more conservative Armand de Quatrefages and the physician Jules Gavarret. She remained the only woman member for the next 15 years. She became an active member of the society and participated in discussions on a wide range of subjects. She also submitted articles to the society's journal, the Bulletin de la Société d'Anthropologie de Paris.

From the reports of discussions published by the society, it would appear that the majority of the members accepted that evolution had occurred. However, the discussions rarely mentioned Darwin's most original contribution, his proposed mechanism of natural selection. Darwin's ideas were considered an extension to those of Lamarck. In contrast, even the possibility that evolution had occurred was rarely mentioned in the discussions of other learned societies such as the Société Botanique, the Société Zoologique, the Société Géologique and the Académie des Sciences.

Royer was always ready to challenge the current orthodoxy and in 1883 published a paper in La Philosophie Positive questioning Newton's law of universal gravitation and criticising the concept of "action at a distance". The editors of the journal included a footnote distancing themselves from her ideas.

Duprat died suddenly in 1885 aged 70 and under French law, neither Royer nor her son had any legal claim on his estate. Royer had very little income and had a son who was studying at the École Polytechnique. Her contributions to prestigious journals such as the Bulletin de la Société d'Anthropologie de Paris and the Journal des Économistes brought in no income. She found herself in a difficult financial situation and applied to the Ministère de l'Instruction Publique for a regular pension but instead was given a small lump sum. She was therefore obliged to reapply each year.

The Société d'Anthropologie organised a series of annual public lectures. In 1887, as part of this series, Royer gave two lectures entitled L'Évolution mentale dans la série organique. She was already suffering from ill health and after these lectures she rarely participated in the affairs of the society.

In 1891 she moved to the Maison Galignani, a retirement home in Neuilly-sur-Seine which had been established with an endowment from the will of the publisher William Galignani. She remained there until her death in 1902.

== Feminism and La Fronde ==
Royer attended the first International Congress on Woman's Rights in 1878 but did not speak. For the Congress in 1889 she was asked by Maria Deraismes to chair the historical section. In her address, she argued that the immediate introduction of women's suffrage was likely to lead to an increase in the power of the church and that the first priority should be to establish secular education for women. Similar elitist views were held by many French feminists at the time, who feared a return to the monarchy with its strong links to the conservative Roman Catholic Church.

When in 1897, Marguerite Durand launched the feminist newspaper La Fronde, Royer became a regular correspondent, writing articles on scientific and social themes. In the same year, her colleagues at the newspaper organised a banquet in her honour and invited a number of eminent scientists.

Her book La Constitution du Monde on cosmology and the structure of matter was published in 1900. In it, she criticized scientists for their over specialization and questioned accepted scientific theories. The book was not well received by the scientific community and a particularly uncomplimentary review in the journal Science suggested that her ideas "show at every point a lamentable lack of scientific training and spirit." In the same year that her book was published, she was awarded the Légion d'honneur.

Royer died in 1902 at the Maison Galignani in Neuilly-sur-Seine. Her son, René, died of liver failure 6 months later in Indochina.
