= Albert Merlin =

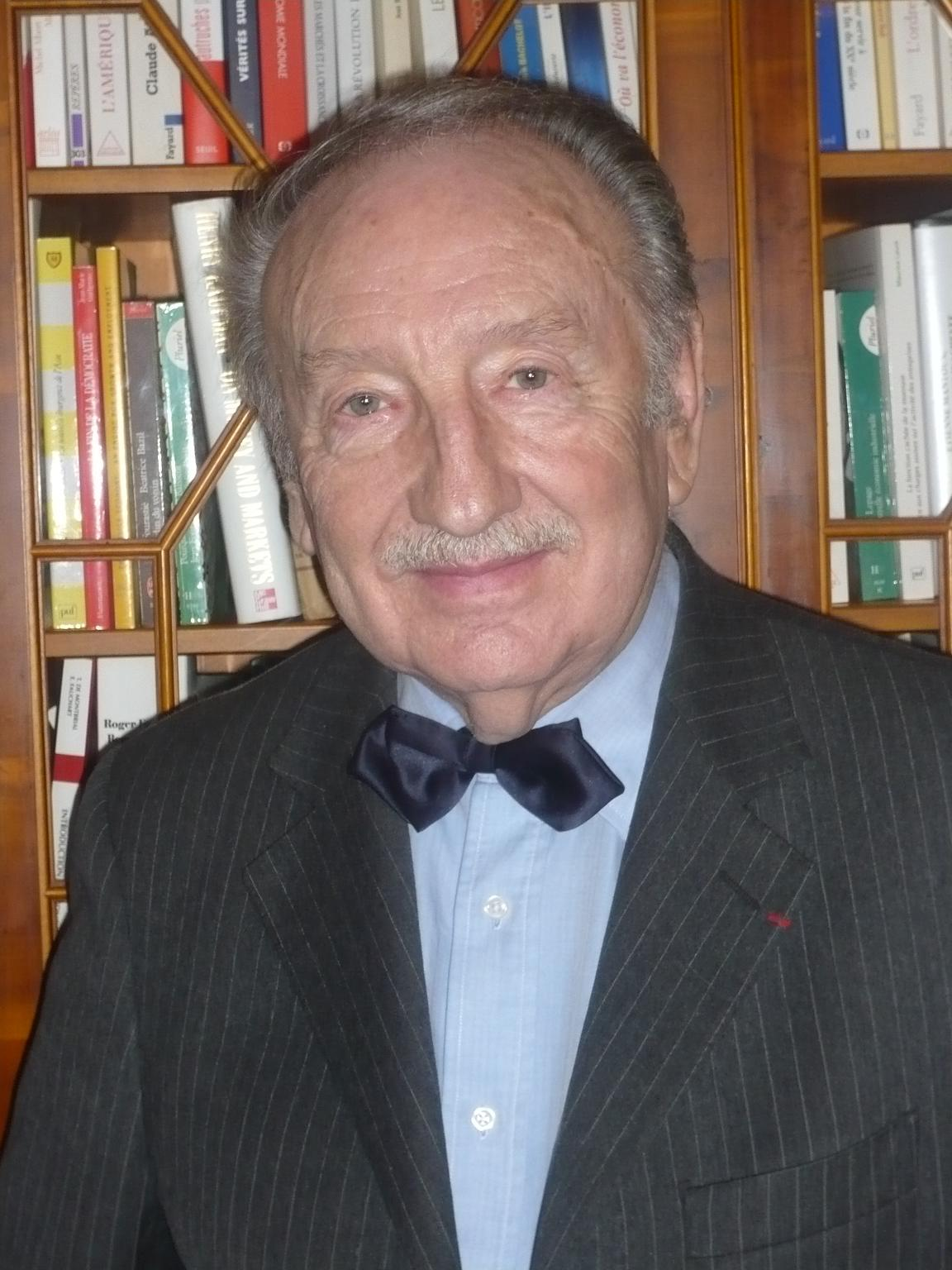
- Born: Albert Merlin; 21 April 1931
- Died: 9 December 2015 (aged 84); Paris, France
- Occupation: Economist

Albert Merlin (21 April 1931 – 9 December 2015) was a French economist and vice-president of the "Presaje" institute, which deals with the interaction between the economy and Law.

== Early life and education ==
After earning a graduate degree in economics and a diploma from the Institut d'Etudes Politiques de Paris in Paris (Sciences Po), Merlin began his career at Rexeco, an economic and business forecasting institute associated with the French Federation of Business. He subsequently joined the Compagnie de Saint-Gobain, the world's leading producer of glass and building materials, first as an industrial economist, then as chief economist.

== Early economic career ==
Merlin was a founder in 1969, then the president, from 1975 to 1979, of the French Association of Business Economists (AFEDE). Then he developed AFEDE's international activities which led him to create, then preside over the European Federation of Business Economists (Eurofabe), which brought together French, British, German, Italian and other European economists.

Alumnus of IMD (International Institute for management development, in Lausanne, Switzerland), Merlin was also active in teaching, first as an associate professor at the Ecole des Hautes Etudes Commerciales then at ENA (Ecole Nationale d'Administration) France's state school for training senior government officials. He was subsequently a professor of Business Economics at Sciences Po from 1986 to 1990.

After serving from 1980 to 1982 on France's Conseil Economique et social (where government, business and labour leaders discuss key issues), Merlin was elected president of the Société d'Economie Politique (founded in 1842) France's society of distinguished academics and corporate economists.

== Contributions ==
On retiring from Saint-Gobain, Merlin founded and directed the journal Societal, which publishes economic and social analyses written by academics as well as business leaders. In 2000, he participated in creating the PRESAJE institute (Prospective et Recherches sur le Droit, la Justice et l'Economie), a think tank specialized in analyzing the interaction between law and economics. He was vice-president of PRESAJE.

== Publications ==
Merlin wrote a book with Michel Drancourt ("Demain la croissance", Growth tomorrow) and is the author of many economic essays, as well as articles published in leading publications including Les Echos, le Monde and Le Figaro. In 2003, he was awarded the Abramson Scroll by the National Association for Business Economics (NABE) for co-authoring with Paul Horne, an American economist, a survey of the economic impact of corporate poor governance in the US.

== Distinctions ==
He is a former co-chairman of the European Council of Economists, sponsored by The Conference Board of New York and Brussels. He is also a member of the National Association for Business Economics in the U.S.

Merlin was made a knight of the Order of the Legion of Honour Légion d'honneur.

== Selected bibliography ==
- "Demain la croissance" avec M. Drancourt (R.Laffont, 1985) : Growth

to-morrow—L'intelligence industrielle (Futuribles, 1989) : Industrial grey matter—De la prévision à la décision (Commentaire, 1993) : From forecasting to decision making—La culture économique dans l'entreprise (Annales des Mines, 1997) : The culture of economics in corporations—Rendements croissants et nouvelle economie (Centre d'observation économique de la Chambre de Commerce de Paris, 2000): Increasing returns and the new economy—Les habits neufs de la productivité (Sociétal, 2003): The new face of productivity—Does" Enronitis " threaten the Dollar and the economy ? with Paul Horne (Business Economics, NABE, 2002)

- A la recherche de la Société Juste (Societal, 2004) Searching for a

just Society—L'économiste d'entreprise (Societal, 2006) : The corporate economist—Le nécessaire, l'utile et le futile (Societal, 2010): The necessary, the useful and the futile
