= Clément Colson =

French economist

Clément Colson (13 November 1853 – 24 March 1939) was a French political economist. He was born in Versailles and died in Paris. Colson was honorary president of the Société d'économie politique from 1929 to 1933.

Colson was trained as an engineer and became Inspecteur-général des ponts et chaussées. He lectured on political economy at Ecole Polytechnique, Ecole des ponts et chaussées, and Ecole Libre des Sciences Politiques. His lectures were public in book form which brought him public notice. He made contributions to statistical techniques in economics. His first book was on transport statistics.

He ended his career as president of the finance section of the Council of State (1920) and finally vice-president of the Council of State (1923-1928). Elected, the April 30, 1910, a full member of the political economy, statistics and finance section, in the chair of Émile Cheysson, he presided over the Academy of Moral and Political Sciences in 1922. In 1925 he spoke out in favour of the devaluation of the franc, which once again attracted the disapproval of the government.
