= Marie Roch Louis Reybaud =

French writer, political economist and politician

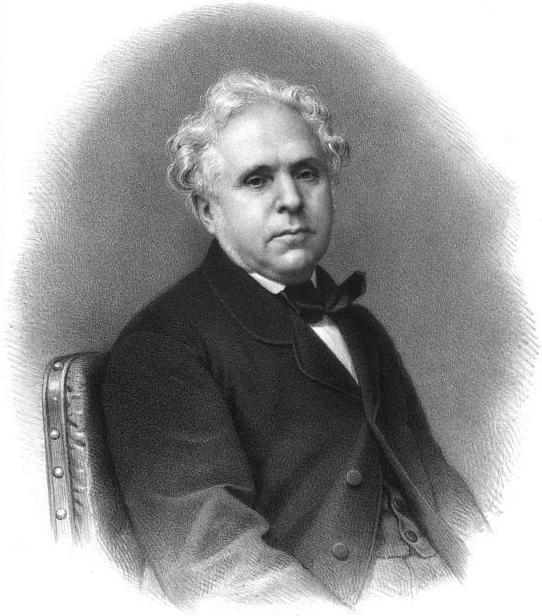
Louis Reybaud

Marie Roch Louis Reybaud (15 August 1799 – 26 or 28 October 1879) was a French writer, political economist and politician. He was born in Marseille.

== Biography ==
After travelling in the Levant and in India, he settled in Paris in 1829. Besides writing for the Radical press, he edited the Histoire scientifique et militaire de l'expédition française en Égypte in ten volumes (1830–36) and Dumont d'Urville's Voyage au tour du monde (1833).

In 1840 he published Études sur les réformateurs ou socialistes modernes which gained him the Montyon prize (1841) and a place in the Académie des sciences morales et politiques (1850). In 1843 he published Jérôme Paturot à la recherche d'une position sociale, a clever social satire that had a prodigious success. In 1846 he abandoned his democratic views, and was elected liberal deputy for Marseille.

Reybaud was an early member of the Société d'économie politique organized in 1842 by Pellegrino Rossi.

His Jérôme Paturot a la recherche de 10 meilleure des republiques (1848) was a satire on the new republican ideas. Afterwards he published La Vie de l'emploi (1855), L'Industrie en Europe (1856), Études sur le régime de nos manufactures (1859), and Le coton: son régime, ses problèmes (1863).

Reybaud died in Paris.
