= Louis Wolowski =

Polish-French writer on economics and politician

Louis-François-Michel-Reymond Wolowski
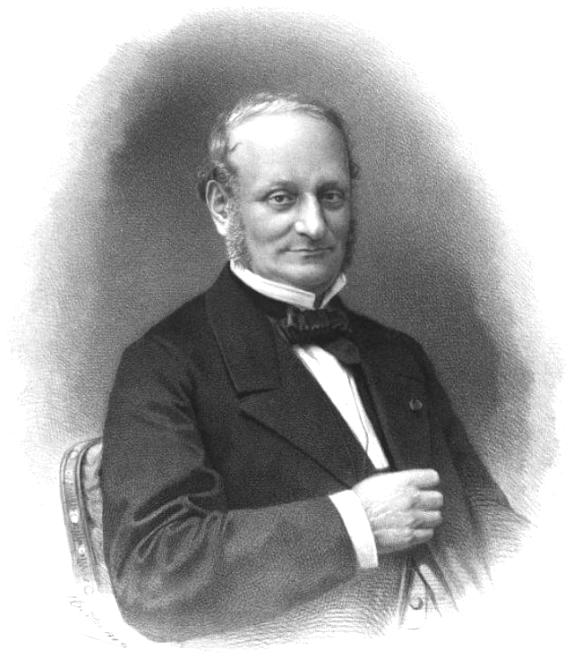
- Louis Wolowski (1867)
- Born: 31 August 1810; Warsaw
- Died: 15 August 1876 (aged 65); Gisors, Eure
- Citizenship: French

Louis-François-Michel-Reymond Wolowski (original Ludwik Franciszek Michał Reymond Wołowski; 31 August 1810 at Warsaw – 15 August 1876 at Gisors, Eure) was a Polish writer on economics and politician, naturalised in France.

== Life ==
His father, a member of the provisional government which emerged during the Polish Revolution in Warsaw in 1830, sent him to Paris, despite his youth, as first secretary of the official legation. When the revolution was quelled, the Wolowski family established themselves in Paris, and in 1836 Louis became a naturalised French citizen. His creation in 1834 of the Revue de législation et de jurisprudence began to make his reputation as jurist and economist; in 1839 a chair of industrial legislation was created for him at the Conservatory of Arts and Crafts, which he occupied for thirty-two years.

Wolowski joined the Conférence Molé, a debating society for aspiring politicians. He was an early member of the Société d'économie politique organized in 1842 by Pellegrino Rossi. In 1855 he became a member of the Académie des Sciences Morales et Politiques. On two occasions Wolowski played a legislative role. Elected representative of the Seine at the Constituent Assembly in 1848 and at the Legislative Assembly in 1849, he directed (10 May 1848) the attention of the Government to the misfortunes of Poland, and voted for the expedition to Rome and the Loi Falloux. Elected in 1871 representative to the National Assembly, he sat on the left Centre and played a very important part in the financial discussions; in December 1875, he became senator for life.

He played an important part in the foundation of the Crédit Foncier, whose principal object was the withdrawal of rural property from the expenses of loans and hypothecary subrogation. A bimetallist in monetary matters and a free trader in commercial matters, he did not carry economic liberalism so far as to oppose all State intervention in the matter of labour; on the contrary, he had a very important share in the law of 19 May 1874, "Loi Joubert", which limited the labour of children and women in manufacturing, and which created division inspectors for the supervision of labour.

== Works ==
"Wolowski", says Jules Rambaud, who studied his work at length, "was animated by sincere piety, concerning which we should not be misled by some epigrams on the ancient economic privileges enjoyed by the clergy."

Among Wolowski's works were:

- "Des sociétés par actions" (1838);
- "Des brevets d'invention et des marques de fabrique" (1840); "De l'organisation du travail" (1844);
- "Etudes d'économie politique et de statistique" (1848);
- "La banque d'Angleterre et les banques d'Ecosse" (1867);
- "L'or et l'argent" (1870).

He published (1856) a translation of Roscher's Principles of Political Economy.

== See also ==
French demonstration of 15 May 1848

== Sources ==
- Pierre Émile Levasseur, La vie et les travaux de Wolowski in Annales du conservatoire des arts et metiers (1876)
- Jules Léon Rambaud, L'oeuvre economique de Wolowski (Paris, 1882)
- Lappert in Johannes Conrad and Wilhelm Lexis, Handworterbuch der Staatswissenschaften, VII (Jena, 1901)
