= Société d'économie politique =

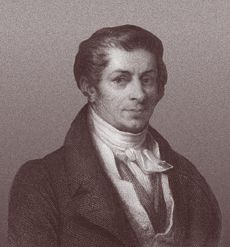
- Jean-Baptiste Say
- Formation: 1842
- Legal status: Active
- Region served: France
- Official language: French
- Website: www.societedeconomiepolitique.org

The Société d’Economie Politique (transl. Political Economy Society) is a French learned society concerned with political economy. It was founded in 1842 to provide a forum for discussion of free trade, a subject of violent debate at the time, and has continued to organize discussions on economic and social issues to the present day.

== History ==
The Société d’Économie Politique was founded on 1 February 1842 in Paris. It was created by the followers of Jean-Baptiste Say to provide an open forum for debate on economics at a time when there were violent arguments over free trade. The society was led informally by Pellegrino Rossi as president and Count Ferdinand-Charles-Philippe d' Esterno (1805–83) as secretary. The debates were very academic in nature, and the society dissolved after a few meetings. Members included Louis Leclerc, Jean-Pierre Clément, Hippolyte Dusard, Louis Reybaud, Louis Wolowski, Léon Faucher, Horace Émile Say (1794–1860), son of Jean-Baptiste Say, Théodore Fix, Charles Dunoyer, Michel Chevalier, Hippolyte Passy and Jérôme-Adolphe Blanqui.

Three friends, Adolphe-Gustave Blaise (1811–86), Joseph Garnier (1813–81) and Gilbert Guillaumin (1801–64) decided to form a freer and more accessible society in which the sessions would be both enjoyable and instructive. It would meet once a month to dine and discuss political economy. This idea was accepted, and the first meeting of five people was held on 15 November 1842 including Blaise, Garnier, Guillaumin and Eugène Daire (1798–1847). The numbers grew with successive meetings, including those from the Rossi-d'Esterno group and others. The society was open to men with very different positions in life and diverse political views, most of them influential either through their position or their writings. They could meet on neutral scientific grounds to exchange views on subjects such as the functions of the state, land rents, commercial freedom, public finances, the Crédit Foncier, regulations and socialism. The central theme was always political economy.

Until 1845 the society had no formal leadership, but each meeting had a president, generally Pellegrino Rossi, who chaired the discussion. In 1845 the society elected two presidents (Charles Dunoyer and Hippolyte Passy), two vice-presidents (Horace Émile Say and Charles Renouard), a secretary, who became permanent in 1849 (Joseph Garnier) and a quaestor (Gilbert Guillaumin). In 1845 it was absorbed by the Société des économistes. In 1847 this society changed its name to the Société d’Economie Politique. By 1852 there were about sixty members from the legislature, administration, industry, commerce, teaching, law, letters and contributors to the Journal des Économistes. Distinguished visitors to Paris were invited to the meetings.

Émile Mireaux was a member of the Société d'économie politique in Paris. He served as its secretary-general from 1930 to 1937, then president from 1937 to 1940. He belonged to the young school that helped adapt the old orthodox doctrines to the modern economy.

As of 2017 the society had almost 450 members, and included academics, business executives and senior civil servants. It continued to provide a forum for discussion of economic and social issues. Once a month the society organizes a dinner-debate at the Cercle de l’Union Interalliée, with a personality invited to present their views on a specific topic. Since 1846 the society has published the Annales d’économie politique, which contains papers and debates from the past academic season.

== Leaders ==
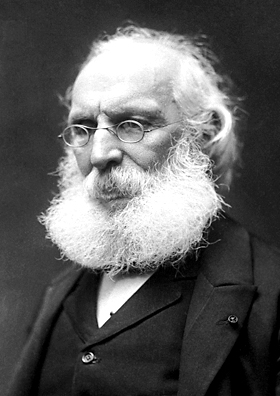
Frédéric Passy (1822–1912), for many years president of the society

Presidents included:

- Charles Dunoyer, 1842–46
- Hippolyte Passy, 1842–46, 1845
- Charles Renouard, 1842–46, 1845-
- Michel Chevalier, 1842–46
- Joseph Garnier, 1842
- Léon Say, 1842
- Édouard René de Laboulaye, 1861
- Frédéric Passy, 1855–1912
- Pierre Émile Levasseur, 1895–1911
- Pierre Paul Leroy-Beaulieu, 1911–16
- Yves Guyot, 1913–28
- Raphaël-Georges Lévy, 1917–28
- Clément Colson, 1929–33
- Henri Truchy, 1932–36
- Edgard Allix, 1937-1938
- Émile Mireaux, 1938–40
- Louis Baudin, 1946–50
- Jacques Rueff, 1950–54
- Édouard Bonnefous, 1954–58
- Gaston Leduc, 1958–62
- Luc Durand-Réville 1962–66
- Daniel Villey, 1966–68
- Jean Marczewski, –1976
- Gérald Heim de Balsac, 1976–80
- Jacques Plassard, 1984–88
- Alain Bienaymé, 1988–92
- Gérard Worms, 1992–94
- Albert Merlin, 1994–96
- Philippe Chalmin, 1998–2000
- Emmanuel Rodocanachi, 2002–04
- Jean-Paul Betbeze, 2004–08
- Jacques Mistral, 2008–12
- Valérie Plagnol, 2012–16
- Denis Ferrand, from November 2016

== Publications ==
- "journal", Annuaire (Société d'économie politique), 1842–1939
- "journal", Annales de la Société d'économie politique (1889), Tome 1 (1846/1853) - tome 15 (1885/1887)
- "journal", Bulletin de la Société d'économie politique, 1888, n° 1 - 1936
- "journal", Annales de la Société d'économie politique, 93e année, n.s., tome 1, n° 1 (1938) - 95e année, tome 3, n° 21/22 (1940, avr./mai)
- "journal", Annales d'économie politique, 4, January/March 1949 – Volume 57, 2009/2010, 2011

== Sources ==
- Courtois, Alphonse (1846), "Notice historique", Annales de la Société d'économie politique (in French)
- "Émile Mireaux", Académiciens (in French), ASMP: Académie des Sciences Morales et Politiques
- Garnier, Joseph (1852), "Économie Politique (Société d')", Dictionnaire de l'économie politique contenant l'exposition des principes de la science, l'opinion des écrivains qui ont le plus contribué a sa fondation et a ses progrés, la bibliographie générale de l'économie politique par noms d'auteurs et par ordre de matiéres, avec des notices biographiques et une appréciation raisonnée des principaux ouvrages: A-I, Meline, Cans
- Jolly, Jean (1960–77), "MIREAUX Emile", Dictionnaire des parlementaires français 1889–1940 (in French)
- Société d'économie politique. France. 1847-... (in French), BnF: Bibliotheque nationale de France
- Société d'Economie Politique (in French), Société d’Economie Politique
