= Michel Chevalier =

French statesman (1806–1879)

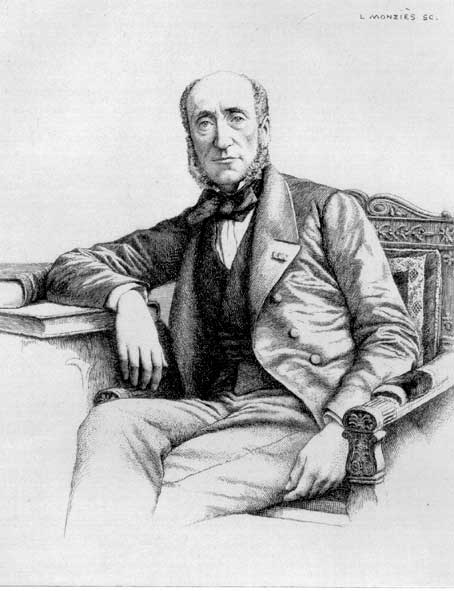
Michel Chevalier

Michel Chevalier (French: [miʃɛl ʃəvalje]; 13 January 1806 – 18 November 1879) was a French engineer, statesman, economist and free market liberal.

== Biography ==
Born in Limoges, Haute-Vienne, Chevalier studied at the École Polytechnique, obtaining an engineering degree at the Paris École des mines in 1829.

In 1830, after the July Revolution, he became a Saint-Simonian, and edited their paper Le Globe. The paper was banned in 1832 when the "Simonian sect" was found to be prejudicial to the social order, and Chevalier, as its editor, was sentenced to six months imprisonment.

After his release, Minister of the Interior Adolphe Thiers sent him in 1834 on a mission to the United States and Mexico to observe the state of industrial and financial affairs in the Americas. In the United States, Chevalier visited different parts of the country, studying American society, its manners, and political, social, and economic institutions. He made some keen observations along the way that were published in France by the Journal des débats producing at the time "an immense effect". In Mexico he exchanged ideas with the mineralogist and politician Andrés Manuel del Río. It was during this trip that he also developed the idea that the Spanish-speaking and Portuguese-speaking parts of the Americas shared a cultural or racial affinity with all the European peoples with a Romance culture. Chevalier postulated that this part of the Americas was inhabited by people of a "Latin race," which could be a natural ally of "Latin Europe" in its struggle with "Teutonic Europe," "Anglo-Saxon America" and "Slavic Europe."

In 1837, he wrote a well-received work, Des intérèts matériels en France, after which his career took off. At age 35, he was appointed professor of political economy at the Collège de France.

In 1839, letters that he sent to France during his mission to North America were translated and edited by Thomas Gamaliel Bradford and published in the United States as, Society, manners, and politics in the United States, being a series of letters on North America. Orestes Brownson reviewed the book and wrote that "The work itself is highly important and interesting, and is well worth the perusal and even the study of every American citizen."

He was elected as a member to the American Philosophical Society in 1852.

Chevalier was an early member of the Société d'économie politique organized in 1842 by Pellegrino Rossi. He was elected a député for the département of Aveyron in 1845, an appointment of Senator followed in 1860. In 1859, he was elected a foreign member of the Royal Swedish Academy of Sciences. Together with Richard Cobden and John Bright he prepared the free trade agreement of 1860 between the United Kingdom and France, which is still called the Cobden-Chevalier Treaty.

He died in his residence near Lodève.

== Works ==
- Des intérèts matériels en France, 1837
- Society, manners and politics in the United States; being a series of letters on North America, 1839
- Histoire et description des voies de communication aux États-Unis, 1840–42, 2 volumes
- Essais de politique industrielle, 1843
- Cours d'économie politique, 1842-44 u. 1850, 3 volumes
- L'isthme de Panama, suivi d'un aperçu sur l'isthme de Suez, 1844
- Les Brevets d'invention examinés dans leurs rapports avec le principe de la liberté du travail et avec le principe de l'égalité des citoyens, 1878

== See also ==
- Manchester capitalism
- Saint-Simonianism
