= Pierre Émile Levasseur =

French economist, historian and professor

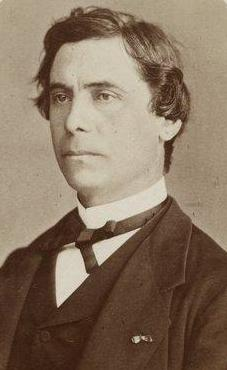
Pierre Émile Levasseur late 19th century

Pierre Émile Levasseur, 3rd Baron Levasseur (8 December 1828 – 10 July 1911), was a French economist, historian, professor of geography, history and statistics in the Collège de France, at the Conservatoire national des arts et métiers and at the École Libre des Sciences Politiques, known as one of the founders and promoters of the study of commercial geography.

== Life and work ==
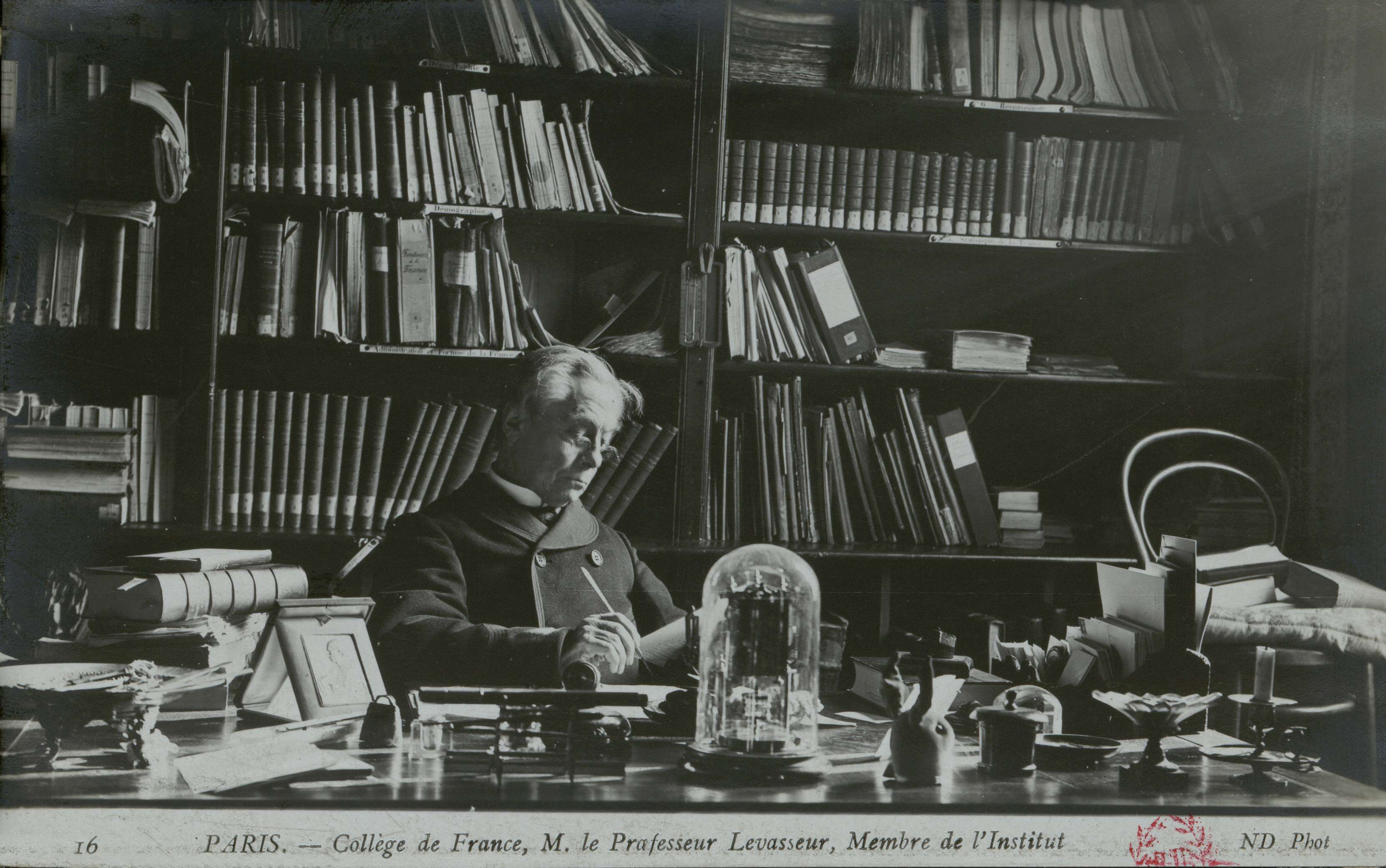
Collège de France. Professor Pierre Émile Levasseur (Bibliothèque de la Sorbonne, NuBIS)

Levasseur was born in Paris, France, as son of the jewelry manufacturer Pierre Antoine Levasseur. He was educated at the École Normale Supérieure in Paris.

Levasseur began teaching in the lycée at Alençon in 1852, and in 1857 became professor of rhetoric at Besançon. He returned to Paris to become professor at the lycée Saint Louis. In 1868 he was chosen a member of the Academy of Moral and Political Sciences. In 1872 he was appointed professor of geography, history and statistics in the College de France, and subsequently became also professor at the Conservatoire des arts et métiers and at the École libre des sciences politiques, which later became known as the Institut d'Etudes Politiques de Paris.

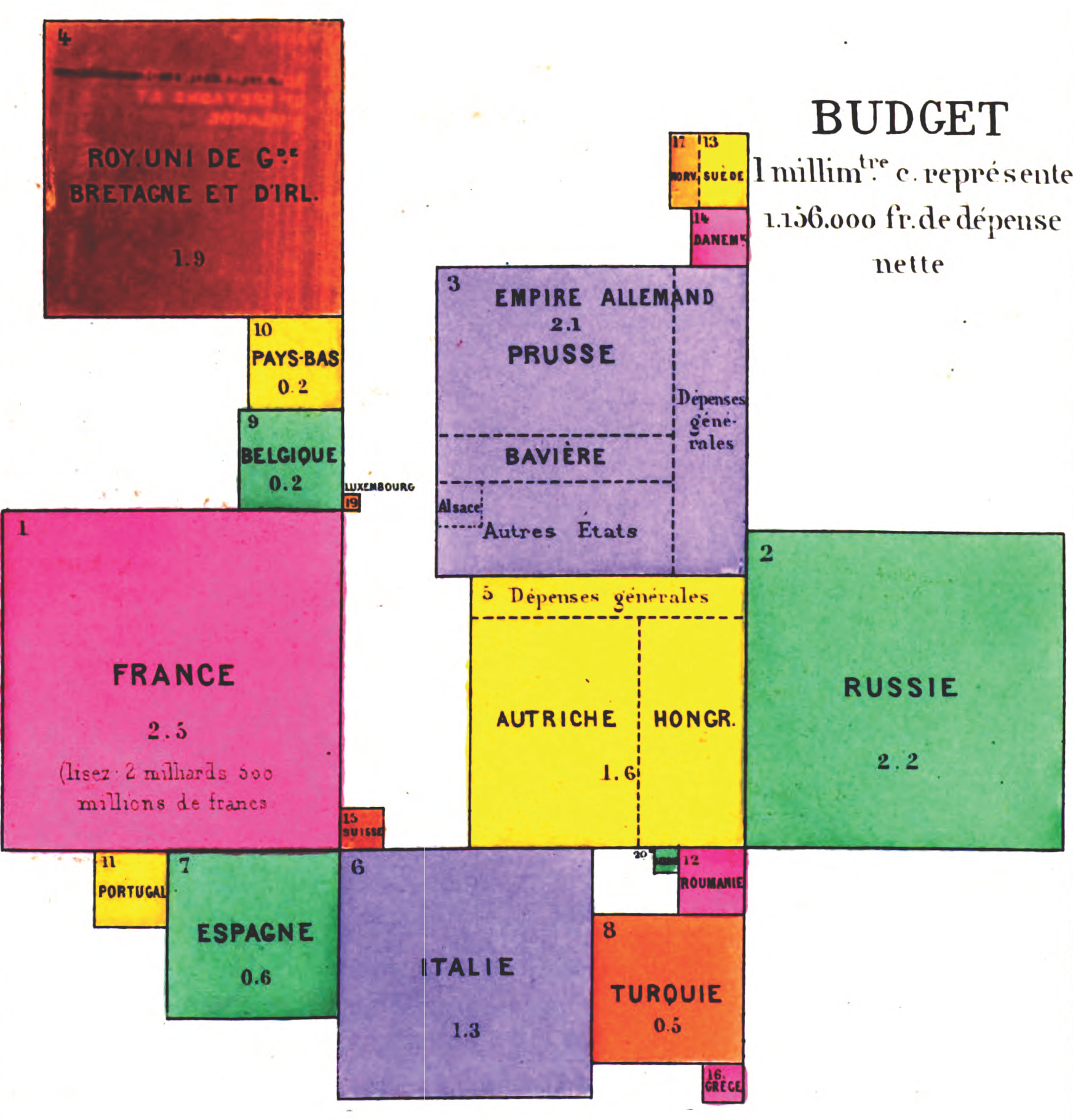
One of Levasseur's 1876 cartograms of Europe, the earliest known published example of this technique.

He strongly believed in the value of using statistics, graphics, and maps to teach the social sciences at a deeper level, and is credited with inventing the cartogram as a teaching aid.

Levasseur was president of the Société d'économie politique. Levasseur was one of the founders of the study of commercial geography, and became a member of the Council of Public Instruction and honorary president of the French geographical society.

In 1886, he was elected as a member to the American Philosophical Society. Levasseur was elected member of the Royal Swedish Academy of Sciences in 1894. He was elected a member of the American Antiquarian Society in 1905.

== Selected publications ==
His numerous writings include:

- La question de l'or (1858)
- Histoire des classes ouvrières en France depuis la conquête de Jules-César jusqu'à la Révolution (1859)
- Histoire des classes ouvrières en France depuis la Révolution jusqu'à nos jours (1867)
- L'Étude et l'enseignement de la géographie (1871)
- La Population française (1889–1892)
- L'Agriculture aux États-Unis (1894)
- L'Enseignement primaire dans les pays civilisés (1897)
- L'Ouvrier américain (1898)
- Questions ouvrières et industrielles sous la Troisième République (1907)
- Histoire des classes ouvrières et de l'industrie en France de 1789 à 1870 (1903–1904)
- Grand Atlas de géographie physique et politique (1890–1894).
