= Adolphe Blanqui =

French economist (1798–1854)

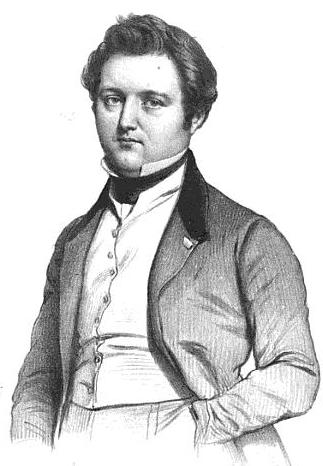
Adolphe Blanqui

Jérôme-Adolphe Blanqui (French: [ʒeʁom adɔlf blɑ̃ki]; November 21, 1798 – January 28, 1854) was a French economist. His most important contributions were made in labour economics, economic history, and especially the history of economic thought, in which field his 1837 treatise has been the first major work. He was a disciple of Jean-Baptiste Say to whom he succeeded in 1833 to the chair of political economy at the Conservatoire des Arts et Métiers, and a free trader.

== Life ==
Blanqui was born at Nice in November 1798, the son of the Girondin politician Jean-Dominique Blanqui; the revolutionary Louis-Auguste Blanqui was his younger brother. He began his career as an instructor, giving his time to chemistry and other sciences allied to medicine, acting as assistant professor of the humanities in the Institution Massin, a Paris secondary school. This job brought him into connection with Say, who procured for young Blanqui the chair of History and Industrial Economy at the School of Commerce in Paris (now ESCP Europe). In 1830, Blanqui rose to the position of director of the school, and in 1833, he succeeded Say in the professor's chair in the Conservatoire des Arts et Métiers.

Blanqui advocated principles of commercial freedom but also showed sympathy for the working class. As a writer, he was noted for research, lucidity, occasional sallies of wit, brilliant passages and eloquence. In an article published for the bicentenary of the school in 2019, Ghislain Deslandes also exhibits his central role in the development of business education in France. As he explains in this text, "combatting ugliness, knowing how to deal with difference, leading by example while keeping pace with technological developments: such are the key messages of Blanqui’s work, and his legacy to posterity. These elements represent the backbone, and reflect the decidedly European character, of Blanqui’s legacy to management teaching and research. To learn about management is to learn about the world, how to interpret and untangle it". Blanqui was an early member of the Société d'économie politique organized in 1842 by Pellegrino Rossi.

Blanqui died in Paris on January 28, 1854.

== Works ==
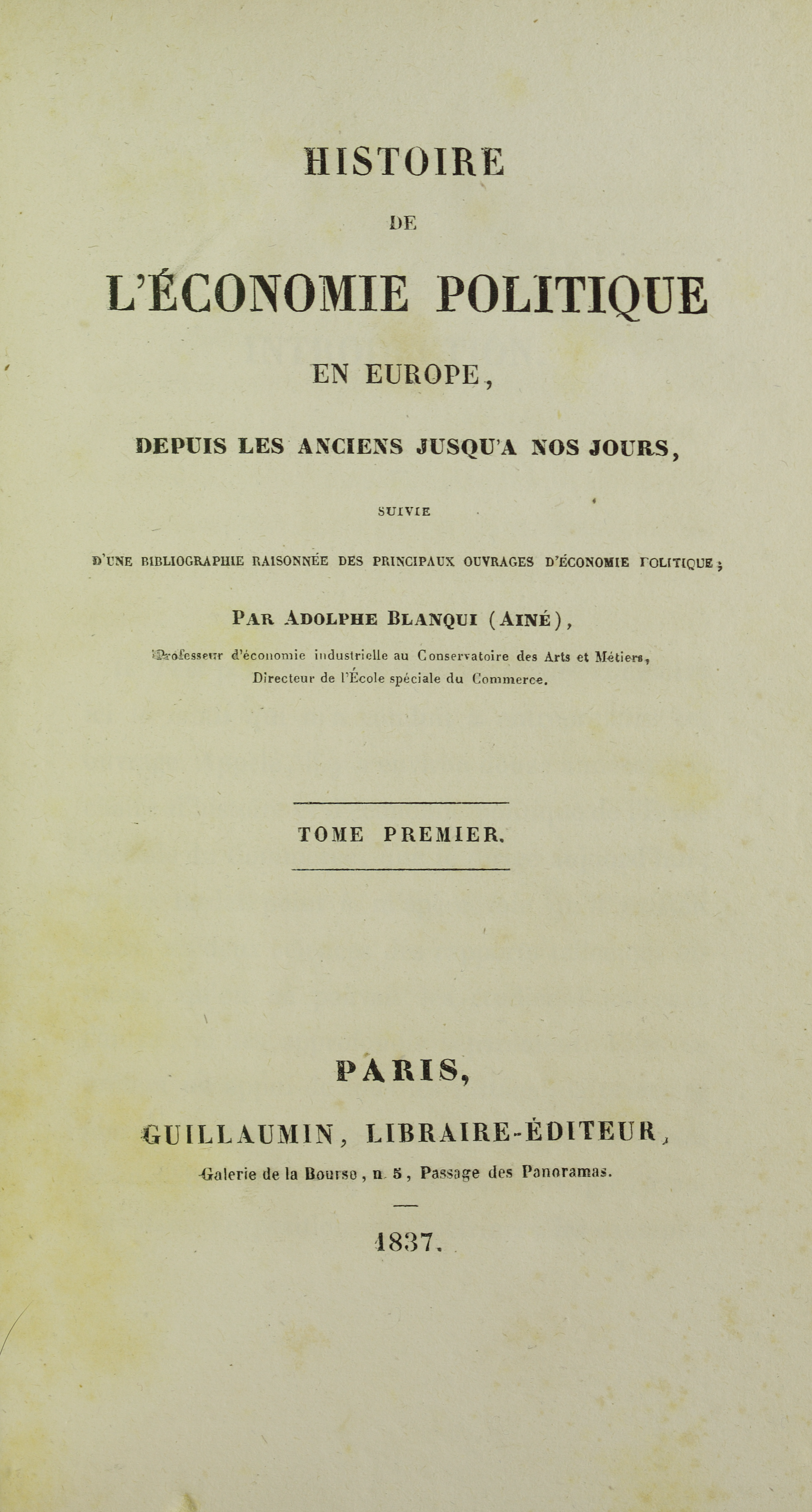
Histoire de l'économie politique en Europe, 1837

Blanqui's major work is Histoire de l'économie politique en Europe depuis les anciens jusqu'à nos jours (1837), translated in English in 1880 as History of Political Economy in Europe. His other publications include Résumé de l'histoire du commerce et de l'industrie (1826), Précis élémentaire d'économie politique(1826), De la situation économique et morale de l'Espagne (1846) and Les classes ouvrières en France (1848).

Besides journalistic articles, Blanqui published also:

- Travels in England and Scotland (1824);
- Journey to Madrid (1826);
- A series of Reports on the Products of French Industry in 1827 (1827);
- The English Minister Huskisson, and his Economic Reform;
- Report on the Economic and Moral Condition of Corsica (1838);
- Report on the Economic Condition of the French Possessions in Algeria (1840);
- Voyage en Bulgarie pendant l'année 1841 (1 ed.). Paris: W. Coquebert. 1843 – via Internet Archive.;
- Report on the World's Fair in London (1851); and
- Life and Work of Jean Baptiste Say.

A series of letters between Blanqui and Emile de Girardin, in which free trade and protection were discussed, appeared in 1846 and 1847.
