= Yves Guyot =

French politician and economist (1843–1928)

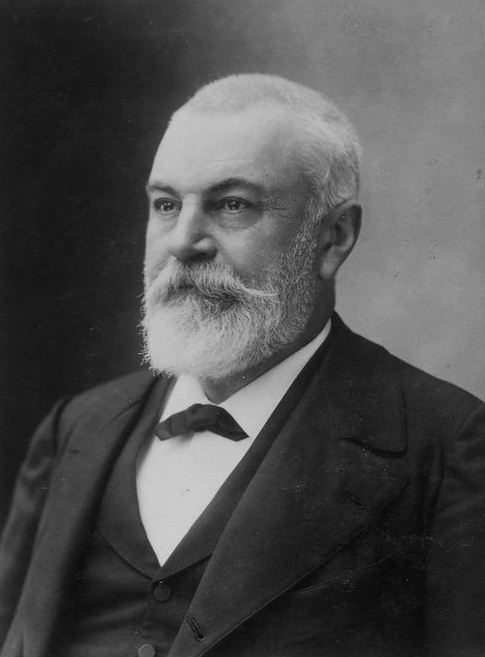
- Portrait of Yves Guyot, by Nadar.
- Born: 6 September 1843; Dinan, France
- Died: 22 February 1928 (aged 84); Paris, France

Academic background
- Influences: Gustave de Molinari
- Awards: Guy Medal (Silver, 1903)

Yves Guyot (English: /ɡiːˈjoʊ/ ghee-YOH, French: [iv gɥijo]; 6 September 1843 – 22 February 1928) was a French politician and economist.

== Biography ==
He was born at Dinan. Educated at Rennes, he took up the profession of journalism, coming to Paris in 1867. He was for a short period editor-in-chief of L'Independent du midi of Nîmes, but joined the staff of Le Rappel on its foundation, and worked subsequently on other journals.

He took an active part in municipal life, and waged a keen campaign against the prefecture of police, for which he suffered six months' imprisonment. He entered the chamber of deputies in 1885 as representative of the 1st arrondissement of Paris and was rapporteur general of the budget of 1888. He became minister of public works under the premiership of P.E. Tirard in 1889, retaining his portfolio in the cabinet of Charles de Freycinet until 1892. Of strong liberal views, he lost his seat in the election of 1893 owing to his militant attitude against socialism.

Yves Guyot was president of the Société d'économie politique from 1917 to 1921 and from 1925 to 1928.

== Works ==
An uncompromising free-trader, he published the following works:

- (1859). Trois ans au Ministère des Travaux Publics, Expériences et Conclusions.
- (1867). L'Inventeur.
- (1872). Histoire des Prolétaires depuis les Temps les plus Reculés jusqu'à nos jours [with Sigismond Lacroix].
- (1872). Nos Préjugés Politiques.
- (1874). Les Lieux Communs, Précédés de l'Histoire d'un Petit Chapitre, d'un Petit Journal et d'un Grand Général.
- (1875). Le Manuel du Parfait Bonapartiste.
- (1881). Dialogue entre John Bull et George Dandin sur le Traité de Commerce Franco-anglais.
- (1881). La Science Économique.
- (1881–1905). Études de Physiologie Sociale [6 vols.]
- (1882). La Famille Pichot: Scènes de l'Enfer Social.
- (1883). La Morale: la Morale Théologique: la Morale Métaphysique: Variations de l'Idéal Moral.
- (1883). L'Organisation Municipale de Paris et de Londres, Présent et Avenir.
- (1884). Un Fou.
- (1885). Un Drôle.
- (1885). Lettres sur la Politique Coloniale.
- (1888). Le Boulangisme.
- (1893). La Tyrannie Socialiste.
- (1894). Les Principes de 89 et le Socialisme.
- (1896). L'Économie de l'Effort.
- (1896). Les Tribulations de M. Faubert. L'Impôt sur le Revenu.
- (1897). La Comédie Socialiste.
- (1897). L'Organisation de la Liberté.
- (1897). Voyages et Découvertes de M. Faubert.
- (1897). L'Œuvre de M. Jules Cambon. La Politique Radicale-socialiste en Algérie.
- (1898). La Révision du Procès Dreyfus, Faits et Documents Juridiques.
- (1898). L'Innocent et le Traître, Dreyfus et Esterhazy, le Devoir du Garde des Sceaux.
- (1898–1901). Dictionnaire du Commerce, de l'Industrie et de la Banque [2 vols.]
- (1899). Affaire Dreyfus, Analyse de l'Enquête.
- (1899). L'Évolution Politique et Sociale de l'Espagne.
- (1899). Les Raisons de Basil.
- (1900). La Politique Boer, Faits et Documents en Réponse au Dr Kuyper.
- (1901). Le Bilan Social Et Politique De L'Eglise,
- (1901). La Question des Sucres en 1901.
- (1903). Le Repêchage des Cinq Cent Millions à l'Eau, le Programme Baudin au Sénat.
- (1903). Le Trust du Pétrole aux États-Unis.
- (1907). La Démocratie Individualiste.
- (1908). La Crise Américaine: ses Effets et ses Causes.
- (1908). La Crise des Transports: Illusions et Réalités.
- (1908). Sophismes Socialistes et Faits Économiques.
- (1909). Le Commerce et les Commerçants.
- (1911). Les Chemins de fer et la Grève.
- (1913). L'A B C du Libre-échange.
- (1913). La Gestion par l'État et les Municipalités.
- (1915). La Province Rhénane et la Westphalie, Étude Économique.
- (1916). Les Causes et les Conséquences de la Guerre.
- (1917). La Question de l'Alcool: Allégations et Réalités.
- (1918). Les Garanties de la Paix [2 vols.]
- (1923). Inflation et Déflation [with Arthur Raffalovich].
- (1923). Les Problèmes de la Déflation.
- (1924). Politique Parlementaire et Politique Atavique.

=== Works in English translation ===
- (1884). Prostitution under the Regulation System.
- (1892). Principles of Social Economy.
- (1894). The Tyranny of Socialism.
- (1900). Boer Politics.
- (1901). The Sugar Question in 1901.
- (1904). Notice on the Palais-Royal.
- (1904). The American Commercial Center in Europe.
- (1906). The Comedy of Protection.
- (1909). Socialistic Fallacies.
- (1910). Economic Prejudices.
- (1914). Where and Why Public Ownership Has Failed.
- (1916). The Causes and Consequences of the War.
