= Ludovic Vitet =

French dramatist and politician (1802–1873)

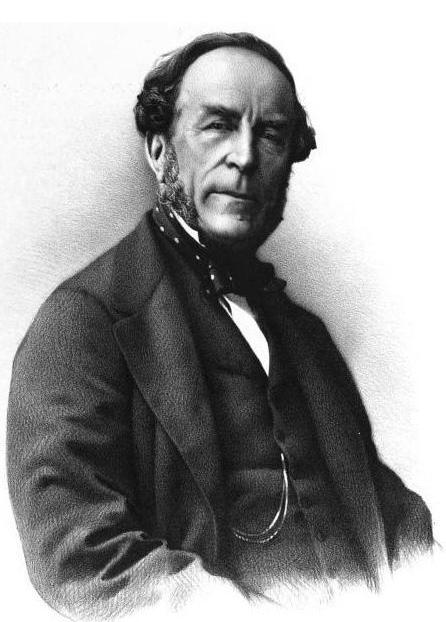
Ludovic Vitet (1865).

Ludovic Vitet (18 October 1802 – 5 June 1873) was a French dramatist and politician.

== Early life and career ==
Ludovic Vitet was born in Paris. He came from a wealthy bourgeois family, as the grandson of former member of the National Convention Louis Vitet (1736 – 1809), and son of Pierre-Jean Vitet and Amélie Arnaudtizon. He was educated at the École Normale. His politics were liberal and he was a member of the society "Aide-toi, le ciel t'aidera." At the École he took courses in philosophy and studied law, practicing and teaching until 1824, when he abandoned these professions to travel around France and to Italy, since he was interested in history, architecture, archeology and music.

In the 1820s, Vitet became one of the contributors to the Globe, a liberal-leaning journal founded by Paul-François Dubois which also featured the writing of Charles de Rémusat, Victor Cousin, and Étienne-Jean Delécluze. He also contributed to the Revue française and the Revue des deux Mondes, of which he was one of the main editors, as well as to the Journal des savants. Between 1827 and 1829 Vitet published several dramatic scenes (Les Barricades, Les Etats de Blois, and La mort de Henri III), which ensured his notoriety and which were later reunited in volume under the title La Ligue (1844).

== Orleanist Monarchy ==
One of the main advocates of liberalism, both political and economic, he was a friend of Madame de Staël, Alessandro Manzoni and Jean Charles Léonard de Sismondi. With a few friends, he founded the society "Aide-toi, le ciel t'aidera" (Help yourself, Heaven will help you) in order to support the Liberals in the elections of 1827. The society's efforts to increase voter registration for the opposition contributed to the defeat of the ultra-royalists in the election. Vitet unsuccessfully requested a prefecture from the Minister of the Interior, François Guizot; however, on 25 November Guizot created for him the new post of Inspector General of Historic Monuments, which foreshadowed the current Ministry of Culture. The report submitted by Vitet in 1831 at the end of his first tour in the north of France shows that he was in charge not only of monuments but also of museums, libraries, archives and schools of artistic education. This report was soon used by Victor Hugo for his pamphlet War on the Demolishers, published in 1832. Vitet made two other tours: one to Burgundy, Lyon and its environs, and Puy in 1831; the other to the southwest in 1833, which gave him the opportunity to save the cloister of Moissac.

During the Orleanist Monarchy of Louis-Philippe Vitet's prominence as a politician and bureaucrat emerged. He presented himself unsuccessfully to the Chamber of Deputies on 21 June 1834, as an elected representative for the 6th district of the Seine-Maritime département (Bolbec). But the Chamber declared the election null and void, so he stood for re-election and was successfully seated the following September 13. He made distinguished speeches in the House and defended the policy of the Ministry of the Interior. On 10 April 1836 Vitet was appointed Secretary General of the Ministry of Commerce and as such resigned from his duties as Inspector General of Historic Monuments, which he handed over to Prosper Mérimée, with whom he continued to closely follow questions concerning historic monuments. In 1837, he became a member of the newly created Commission des monuments historiques, which had just been created and which awarded grants for and oversaw the restoration of historic sites. He served as vice-president of the commission from 1839 onwards. Vitet was elected to the Académie des inscriptions et belles-lettres on 15 December 1839; he was then elected to the Académie Française on 8 May 1845, filling the vacated chair of the late Alexandre Soumet.

In 1836, Vitet was appointed simultaneously as Secretary General of the Ministry of Finance and to the Council of State. He also successfully stood for re-election on October 15 that year, and was successively re-elected on 4 November 1837, 2 March 1839, 9 July 1842 and 1 August 1846, serving six terms in all. In the Chamber, he voted for the endowment of the Duke of Nemours, for the census, for the Pritchard indemnity, and wrote the official report for the law on patents.

== Later career ==
After the Revolution of 1848, Vitet remained faithful to the Orléans family. He ran unsuccessfully in the Constituent Assembly elections in the Seine-Inférieure department, but was elected to the Legislative Assembly on 13 May 1849 and became one of its vice-presidents. He took his place in the monarchist majority and voted for the expedition to Rome; for the Falloux Laws on education; and for the law of 31 May 1850, restricting universal suffrage. Hostile to the policy of the prince-president, he was among the deputies who met at the town hall of the 10th arrondissement of Paris to protest against the coup d'état of 2 December 1851, that ended the Second Republic and gave Louis-Napoleon presidential powers for ten years, effectively beginning the Second Empire. As vice-president of the meeting, Vitet was arrested and imprisoned for a few days.

Under the Second Empire, he moved away from public life and dealt only with art and literature, in part because he remained a monarchist. The disasters of 1870-71 reawakened Vitet's interest in public affairs, and he published in the Revue des deux mondes his optimistic "Lettres sur le siège de Paris." He joined the Republic after its inception on 4 September 1870, and during the Siege of Paris he published a series of articles in the Revue des deux Mondes in which he advocated resistance.

Elected deputy again for Seine-Inferieure in the National Assembly on 8 February 1871, he was, from the start, one of the chamber's vice-presidents and was part of the commission headed by Adolphe Thiers to negotiate peace with the Germans. He deposited the bill of 30 August 1871, in which the Assembly recognized itself as constituting power, which passed by a vote of 434 to 225. He wrote the official report on the "Rivet law," creating the Third Republic, which he personally opposed. In June 1872, Vitet was part of the delegation sent by the right to Thiers to persuade the latter to adopt a conservative policy. He voted for peace with the Germans, for the abrogation of the laws of exile, for the petition of the bishops, against the three-year service, and in May 1873 for the resignation of Thiers. This was his last vote before his death a fortnight later.

Under the Third Republic, he had also regained his position as president of the Commission des monuments historiques and worked both for the revision of the list of historical monuments and for the verification of the accounts of the works.

== Family and personal life ==
Ludovic Vitet had married Cécile Perier (1814 – 1858), the daughter of Scipion Perier, with whom he had no children; but he adopted his niece Hélène Casimir-Perier, whom he made his heiress. He had a sister Amélie, wife of Eugène Aubry-Vitet.

Vitet was the author of some valuable works on the history of art, and his Monographie de l'Église Notre-Dame de Noyon (1845) especially did much to awaken popular interest in architecture. In the early days of the Romantic movement, he wrote some vivid dramatic sketches. They are:

- Les Barricades, scènes historiques (1826)
- Les États de Blois, scènes (1827)
- La Mort de Henri III (1829)

All three were published together in 1844 with the title of La Ligue.
