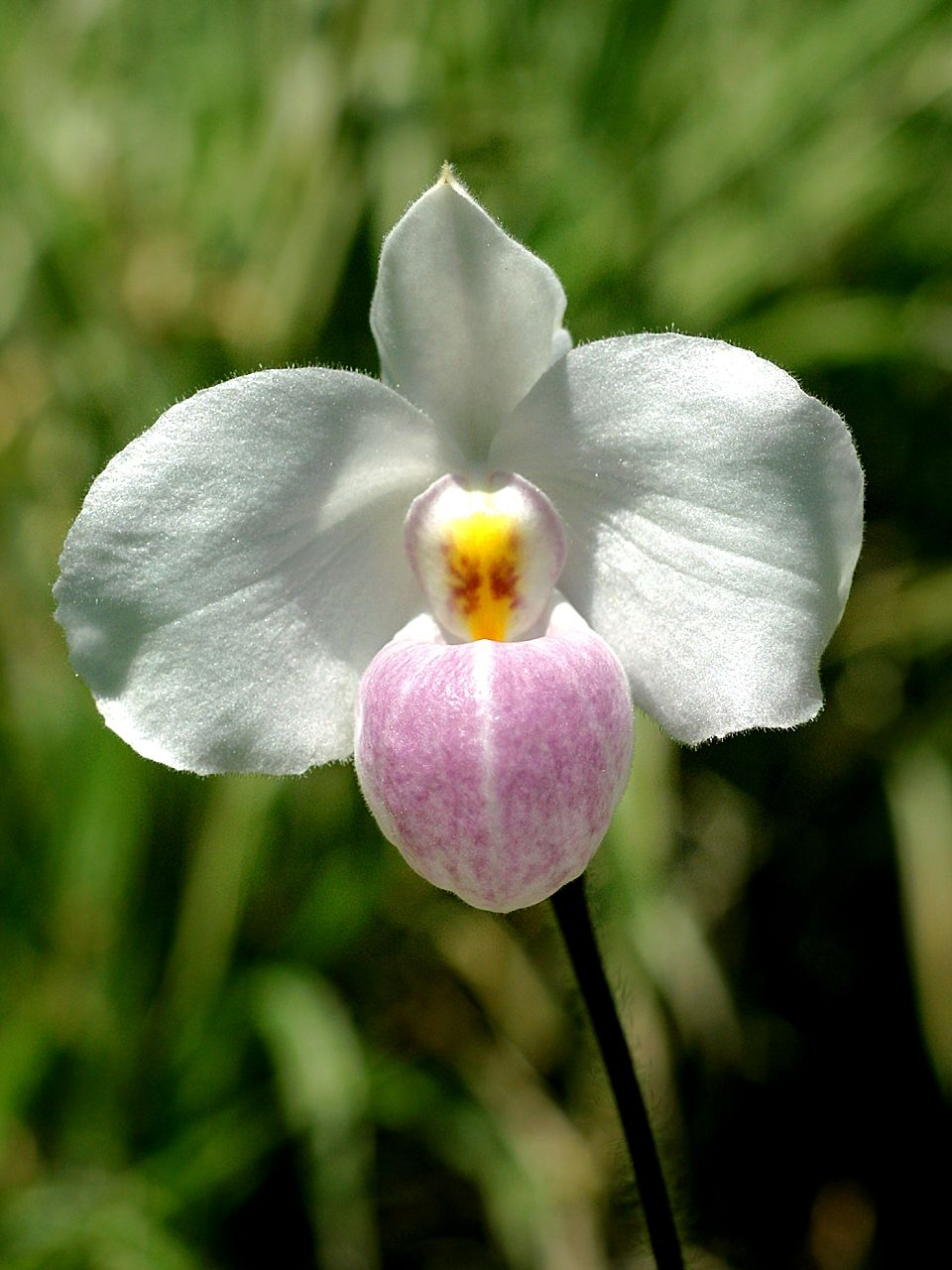

Scientific classification
- Kingdom: Plantae
- Clade: Tracheophytes
- Clade: Angiosperms
- Clade: Monocots
- Order: Asparagales
- Family: Orchidaceae
- Subfamily: Cypripedioideae
- Genus: Paphiopedilum
- Species: P. delenatii

Binomial name
- Paphiopedilum delenatii Guillaumin

Synonyms
- Cypripedium delenatii (Guillaumin) C.H.Curtis; Paphiopedilum delenatii f. albinum Braem

= Paphiopedilum delenatii =

Species of orchid

Paphiopedilum delenatii, described in 1924, is named after Delanat, a French orchid enthusiast of the 1900s. It was first discovered in 1913 when it was brought to France by returning soldiers, and was believed to be extinct and was not rediscovered in the wild until 1993. In the wild, blooming is in December, but in cultivation the plants generally bloom later, from January to March (July to September in the southern hemisphere). The flowers are fragrant.

== Distribution ==
Paphiopedilum delenatii is found in southeastern Vietnam at elevations of 800 to 1300 meters. Plants are found growing in granite pebbles and mossy tree trunks, usually near water in a shady area. The area is subjected to fog from fall to winter and heavy rain in the summer.

== Forms as synonyms ==
- Paphiopedilum delenatii f. albinum Braem (1998)
- Paphiopedilum delenatii f. vinicolor O.Gruss & Roeth (2007)
- Paphiopedilum delenatii f. lutescens Grell & Gunzenh. (2010)
