= Charles Coquelin =

French economist

Charles Coquelin (25 November 1802 in Dunkerque – 12 August 1852 in Paris) was a French economist.

He wrote on the banking sector in his "Dictionnaire de l’économie politique" and "Le crédit et les banques". He also wrote in the Revue des deux Mondes on the linen industry in Britain and France. During the 1870s Léon Walras criticised Coquelin's ideas on competition in the economy.
