= Prosper Duvergier de Hauranne =

French journalist and politician (1798–1881)

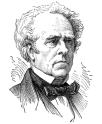
Prosper Duvergier de Hauranne.

Prosper Duvergier de Hauranne (3 August 1798, Rouen – 20 May 1881, Herry) was a French journalist and politician.

Preceded by Victor de Broglie	Seat 24 of the Académie française 1870-1881	Succeeded by Sully Prudhomme
