= Crédit Foncier de France =

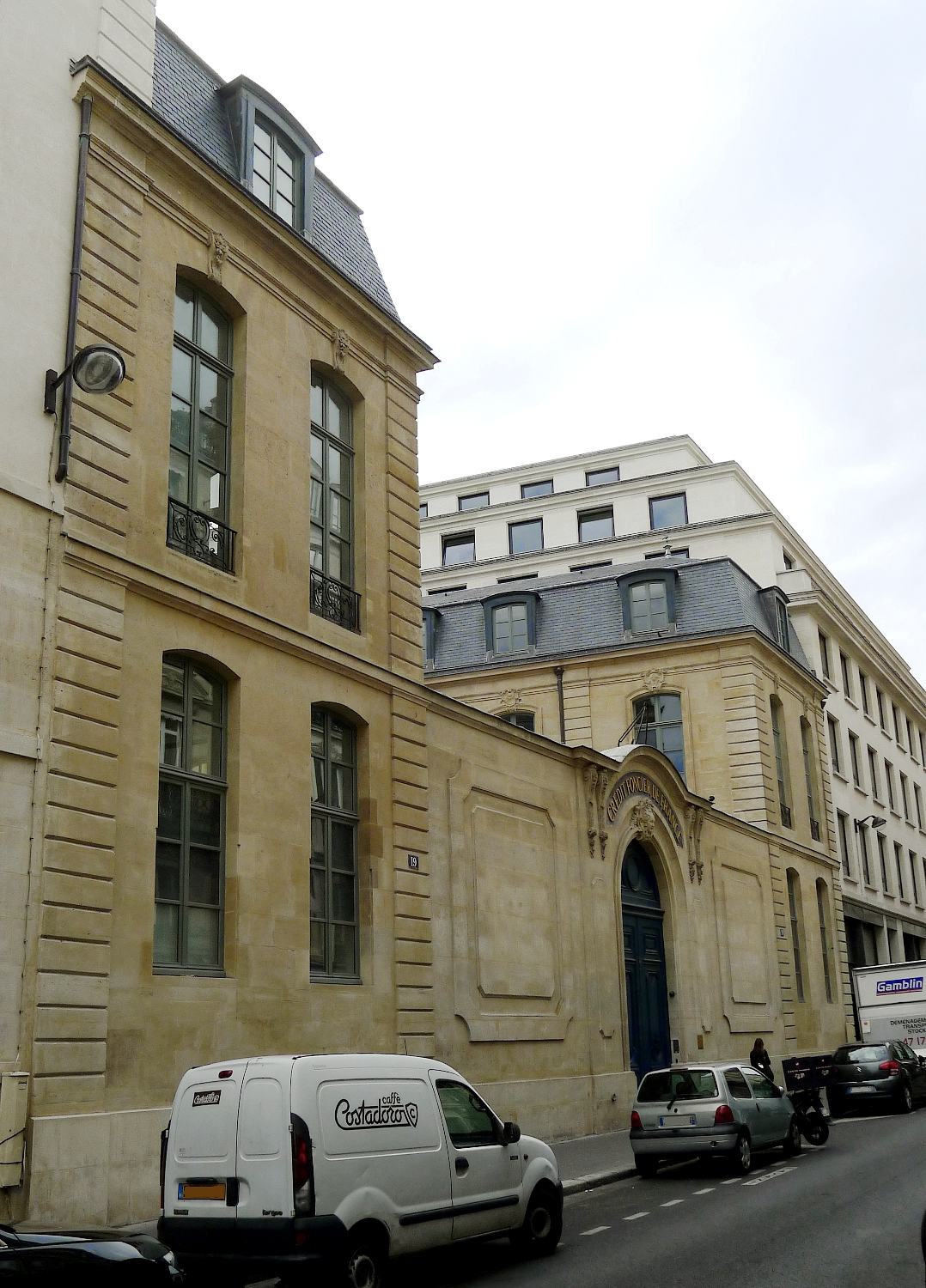
Former head office of Crédit Foncier at 19, rue des Capucines in Paris

Crédit Foncier de France (French pronunciation: [kʁedi fɔ̃sje də fʁɑ̃s], CFF) was a major French bank, active from 1852 to 2019 when its activities were entirely subsumed into Groupe BPCE, although the brand name appears to remain active.

== History ==
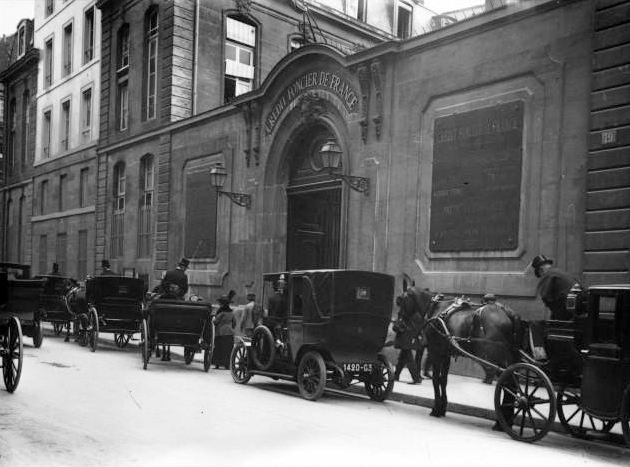
Entrance of Credit Foncier de France, c. 1913

The Crédit Foncier (English: landed credit) initially made loans to communes. The movement was initiated by Louis Wolowski and Count Xavier Branicki, and sanctioned by Emperor Napoleon III in 1852 in an attempt to modernize the medieval French banking system and expand French investment outside Europe. Its name became the "Banque Foncière of Paris". Similar institutions at Nevers and Marseille were amalgamated into one under the title of "Crédit Foncier de France". The amount of the loan could not exceed half of the value of the property pledged or hypothecated, and that the repayment of the loan was by an annuity, which included the interest and part of the principal, terminable at a certain date. The Crédit Foncier had a monopoly on mortgages.

In French banking terminology, a "credit foncier loan" typically refers to a loan for a fixed period with regular repayments where each repayment includes components of both principal and interest, such that at the end of the period the principal will have been entirely repaid. This is to be contrasted with an interest-only loan where the repayments are of interest only.

On 26 June 2018 it was announced that the organisation was to be closed, and its activities integrated into BPCE. The brand appears to remain active.

== Former headquarters ==
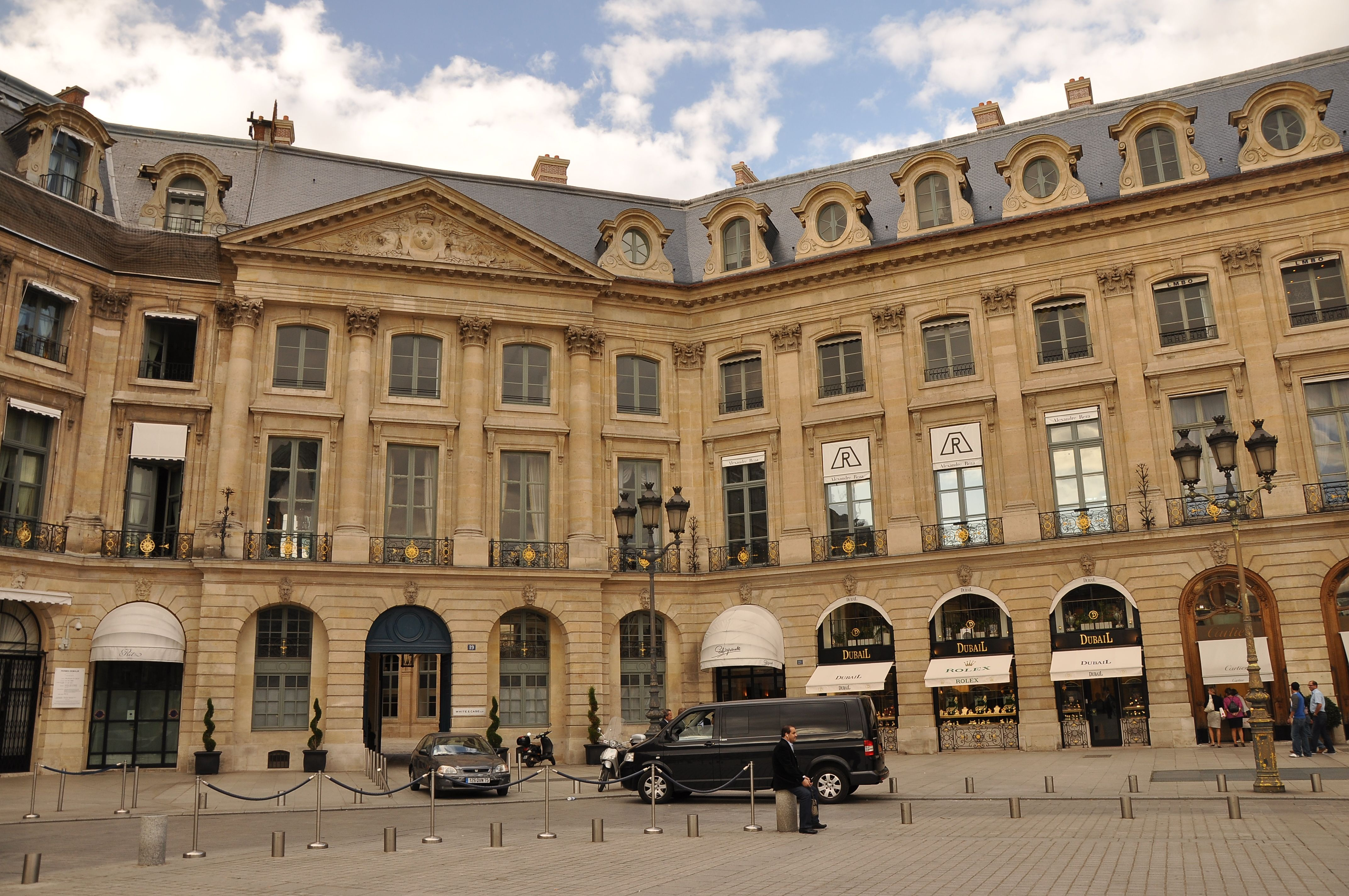
Façade of the former Crédit Foncier complex on Place Vendôme

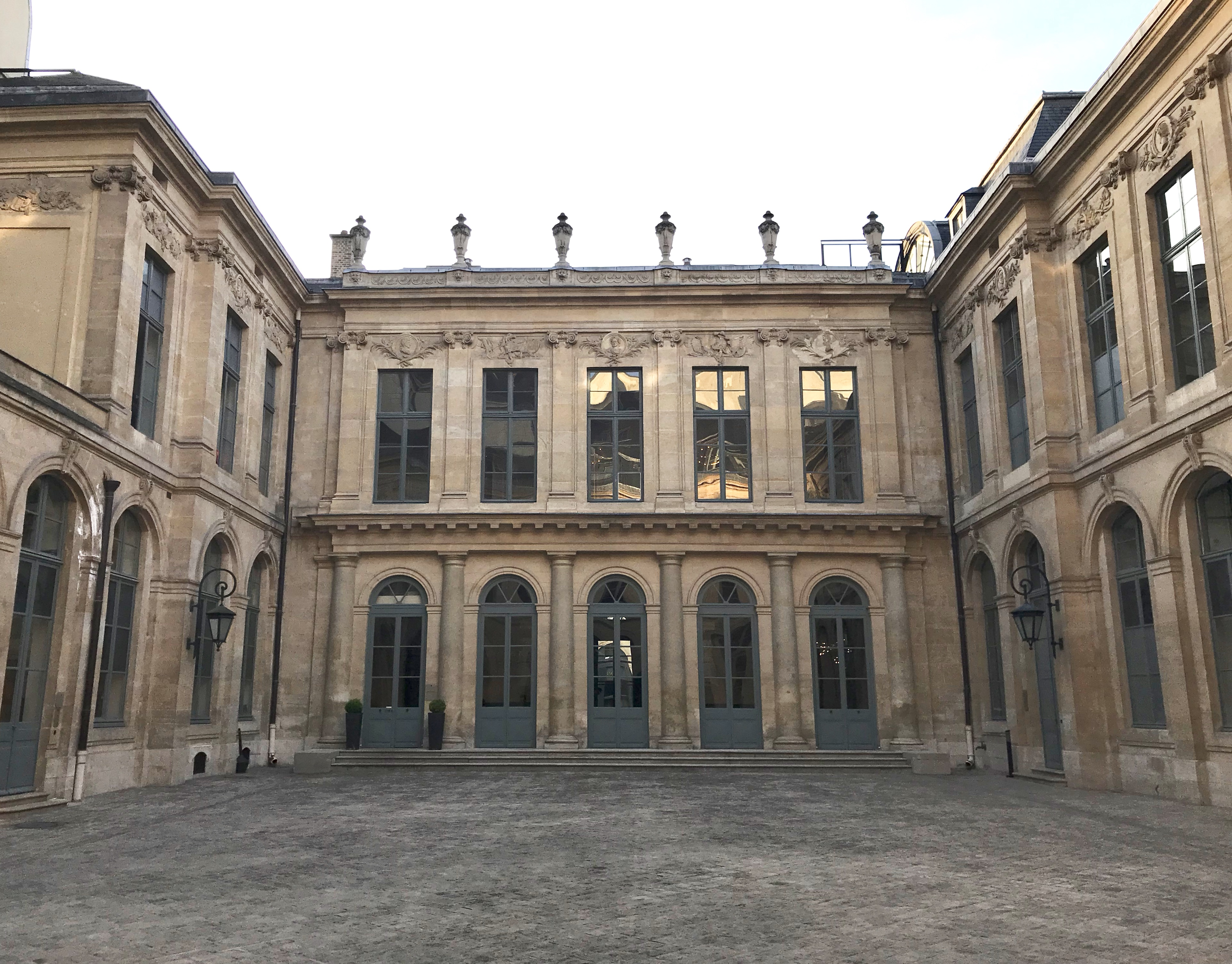
Interior court of the former Hotel d'Evreux

The Crédit Foncier used to be headquartered in a prestigious building complex that included the former Hôtel d'Évreux on Place Vendôme, and the Hôtel Castanier on rue des Capucines as well as a number of adjacent constructions. Crédit Foncier moved into the Hôtel Castanier as early as 1854, had it remodeled by architect Antoine-Nicolas Bailly, and expanded into the Hotel d'Evreux in 1896.

The property was sold by Crédit Foncier to the Thani family of Qatar in 2003 for 250 million euro, and was comprehensively renovated from 2009.
