= The Law (Bastiat book) =

1850 book by Frédéric Bastiat

- Title page for La Loi ("The Law", 1850)
- Author: Frédéric Bastiat
- Original title: La Loi
- Language: French
- Publication date: 1850
- Text: The Law at Wikisource

The Law (French: La Loi) is an 1850 book by Frédéric Bastiat. It was written at Mugron two years after the third French Revolution and a few months before his death of tuberculosis at age 49. The essay was influenced by John Locke's Second Treatise on Government and in turn influenced Henry Hazlitt's Economics in One Lesson. It is the work for which Bastiat is most famous, followed by the candlemaker's petition and the parable of the broken window.

== Overview ==
In The Law, Bastiat wrote that "each of us has a natural right – from God – to defend his person, his liberty, and his property." He described the State as a "substitution of a common force for individual forces" to defend this right. He contended that law becomes perverted when it is used to violate the rights of the individual, when it punishes one's right to defend himself against an effort of others to legislatively enact laws which plunder his wealth/property.

Bastiat asserted that whereas justice has precise limits, philanthropy is limitless and thus government can grow endlessly when that becomes its function. The resulting statism, he argued, is "based on this triple hypothesis: the total inertness of mankind, the omnipotence of the law, and the infallibility of the legislator." The relationship between the public and the legislator becomes "like the clay to the potter." Bastiat stated, "I do not dispute their right to invent social combinations, to advertise them, to advocate them, and to try them upon themselves, at their own expense and risk. But I do dispute their right to impose these plans upon us by law – by force – and to compel us to pay for them with our taxes."

== Content ==
Bastiat argues in the work that a government consists only of the people within or authorizing it, therefore it has no legitimate powers beyond those that people would individually have:

Socialism, like the ancient ideas from which it springs, confuses the distinction between government and society. As a result of this, every time we object to a thing being done by government, the socialists conclude that we object to its being done at all. We disapprove of state education. Then the socialists say that we are opposed to any education. We object to a state religion. Then the socialists say that we want no religion at all. We object to a state-enforced equality. Then they say that we are against equality. And so on, and so on. It is as if the socialists were to accuse us of not wanting persons to eat because we do not want the state to raise grain.

He goes on to describe the rights that those individuals do have, which he recognizes as natural rights, based on natural law. He summarizes these as life, liberty, and private property, explaining that government's only legitimate role is to protect them:

Life, liberty, and property do not exist because men have made laws. On the contrary, it was the fact that life, liberty, and property existed beforehand that caused men to make laws in the first place.

Therefore, government is simply an extension of these specific natural rights to a collective force, and its main purpose is the protection of these rights. Any government that oversteps beyond this role, acting in ways that an individual would not have the right to act, places itself at war with its own purpose:

But, unfortunately, law by no means confines itself to its proper functions. And when it has exceeded its proper functions, it has not done so merely in some inconsequential and debatable matters. The law has gone further than this; it has acted in direct opposition to its own purpose. The law has been used to destroy its own objective: It has been applied to annihilating the justice that it was supposed to maintain; to limiting and destroying rights which its real purpose was to respect. The law has placed the collective force at the disposal of the unscrupulous who wish, without risk, to exploit the person, liberty, and property of others. It has converted plunder into a right, in order to protect plunder. And it has converted lawful defense into a crime, in order to punish lawful defense.

Bastiat thus also points out that those who resist plunder, as is their natural right, become targets of the very law that was supposed to protect their rights in the first place. Laws are passed saying that opposing plunder is illegal, with punishments that will accumulate to death, if resisted consistently.

Though living in France, Bastiat wrote this book when slavery was still legal in the United States and was very controversial there, as it was in Europe. In the U.S. at that time, there was a dramatic struggle between the agricultural southern states and the industrialized northern. Globally famous were the two key components of this, with the northern states imposing crippling tariffs that impoverished the South while trying to ban slavery. Bastiat pointedly describes both slavery and tariffs as forms of "legal plunder".

There is no country in the world where the law is kept more within its proper domain: the protection of every person's liberty and property. As a consequence of this, there appears to be no country in the world where the social order rests on a firmer foundation. But even in the United States, there are two issues—and only two—that have always endangered the public peace.

What are these two issues? They are slavery and tariffs. These are the only two issues where, contrary to the general spirit of the republic of the United States, law has assumed the character of a plunderer.

Slavery is a violation, by law, of liberty. The protective tariff is a violation, by law, of property.

Bastiat goes on to describe other forms of plunder, both legalized by the state and banned. He then concludes that the problem of it must be settled once and for all. He says that there are three ways to do so:

1. The few plunder the many.
2. Everybody plunders everybody.
3. Nobody plunders anyone.

He points out that, given these options, what is obviously the best for society is the last one, with all plunder being ended. But, that being an ideal, he advocates for a return to the first. Bastiat argues that universal suffrage expanded the number of political blocs vying for control of the state and, therefore, expanded plunder. Because he conceptualizes the state as a force of domination necessary to counteract human nature, he says the state should be limited to only that purpose instead of trying to provide philanthropic services, as those services are liable to expand into oppressive systems.

== Influence ==
The Law has been cited by many thinkers from a broad range of ideologies. Ron Paul describes it as one of the main books that influenced him. Ronald Reagan cited it as a deep influence. The Federalist Society includes it on their pre-law reading list. Milton Friedman frequently recommended it as a reference.

== Contemporaries mentioned in The Law ==
- François-Noël Babeuf
- Jacques Nicolas Billaud-Varenne
- Louis Blanc
- Jacques-Bénigne Bossuet
- Étienne Cabet
- Étienne Bonnot de Condillac
- Victor Prosper Considérant
- Charles Dupin
- François Fénelon
- Charles Fourier
- Louis Michel le Peletier de Saint-Fargeau
- Gabriel Bonnot de Mably
- Charles de Secondat, baron de Montesquieu
- Morelly
- Robert Owen
- Pierre-Joseph Proudhon
- Guillaume Thomas François Raynal
- Maximilien Robespierre
- Jean-Jacques Rousseau
- Louis de Saint-Just
- Claude Henri de Rouvroy, comte de Saint-Simon
- Adolphe Thiers
