= Robert Leroux =

Robert Leroux may refer to:

- Robert Leroux (fencer) (born 1967), French fencer
- Robert Leroux (sociologist)
- Robert Leroux (1950–2005), Quebec singer-songwriter
