= Pierre-Joseph Proudhon =

French philosopher and anarchist (1809–1865)

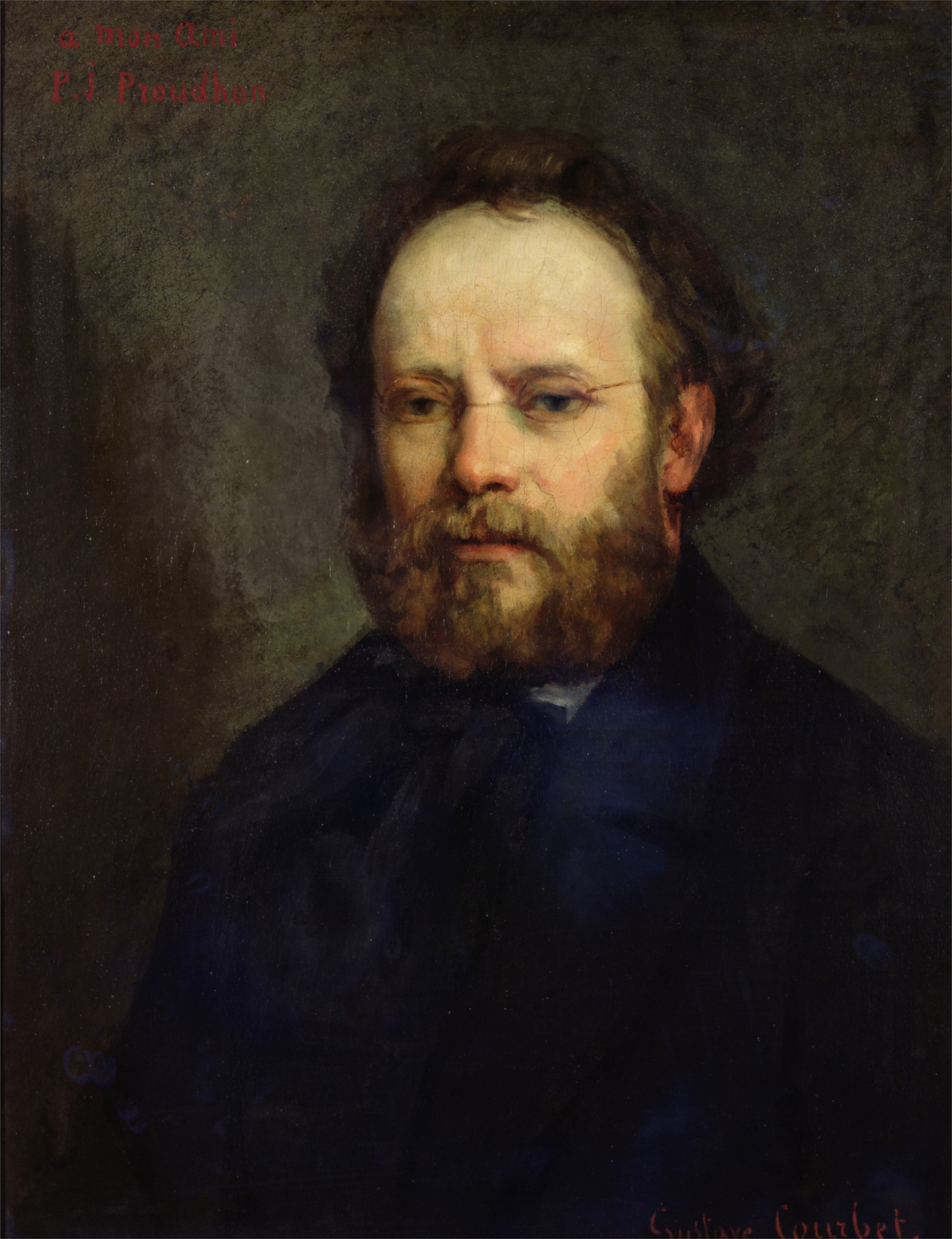
- 1865 portrait
- Born: 15 January 1809; Besançon, France
- Died: 19 January 1865 (aged 56); Passy, Paris, France

Philosophical work
- Era: 19th-century philosophy
- Region: Western philosophy
- School: Anarchism; mutualism; socialism
- Main interests: Political philosophy; property theory; atheism
- Notable ideas: Property is theft; Economic federalism; Mutualism; Dual power

Pierre-Joseph Proudhon (/ˈpruːdɒ̃/, also US: /pruːˈdoʊn/; French: [pjɛʁ ʒozɛf pʁudɔ̃]; 15 January 1809 – 19 January 1865) was a French anarchist, socialist, philosopher, and economist who founded mutualist philosophy and is considered by many to be the "father of anarchism". He was the first person known to self-identify as an anarchist, and is widely regarded as one of anarchism's most influential theorists. Proudhon became a member of the French Parliament after the Revolution of 1848, whereafter he referred to himself as a federalist. Proudhon described the liberty he pursued as the synthesis of community and individualism. Some consider his mutualism to be part of individualist anarchism while others regard it to be part of social anarchism.

Proudhon, who was born in Besançon, was a printer who taught himself Latin in order to better print books in the language. His best-known assertion is that "property is theft!", contained in his first major work, What Is Property? Or, an Inquiry into the Principle of Right and Government (Qu'est-ce que la propriété? Recherche sur le principe du droit et du gouvernement), published in 1840. The book's publication attracted the attention of the French authorities. It also attracted the scrutiny of Karl Marx, who started a correspondence with its author. The two influenced each other and they met in Paris while Marx was exiled there. Their friendship finally ended when Marx responded to Proudhon's The System of Economic Contradictions, or The Philosophy of Poverty with the provocatively titled The Poverty of Philosophy. The dispute became one of the sources of the split between the anarchist and Marxist wings of the International Working Men's Association. Some, such as Edmund Wilson, have contended that Marx's attack on Proudhon had its origin in the latter's defense of Karl Grün, whom Marx bitterly disliked, but who had been preparing translations of Proudhon's work.

Proudhon favored workers' councils and associations or cooperatives as well as individual worker/peasant possession over private ownership or the nationalization of land and workplaces. He considered social revolution to be achievable in a peaceful manner. Proudhon unsuccessfully tried to create a national bank, to be funded by what became an abortive attempt at an income tax on capitalists and shareholders. Similar in some respects to a credit union, it would have given interest-free loans. After the death of his follower Mikhail Bakunin, Proudhon's libertarian socialism diverged into individualist anarchism, collectivist anarchism, anarcho-communism and anarcho-syndicalism, with notable proponents such as Carlo Cafiero, Joseph Déjacque, Peter Kropotkin and Benjamin Tucker.

== Biography ==
=== Early life and education ===
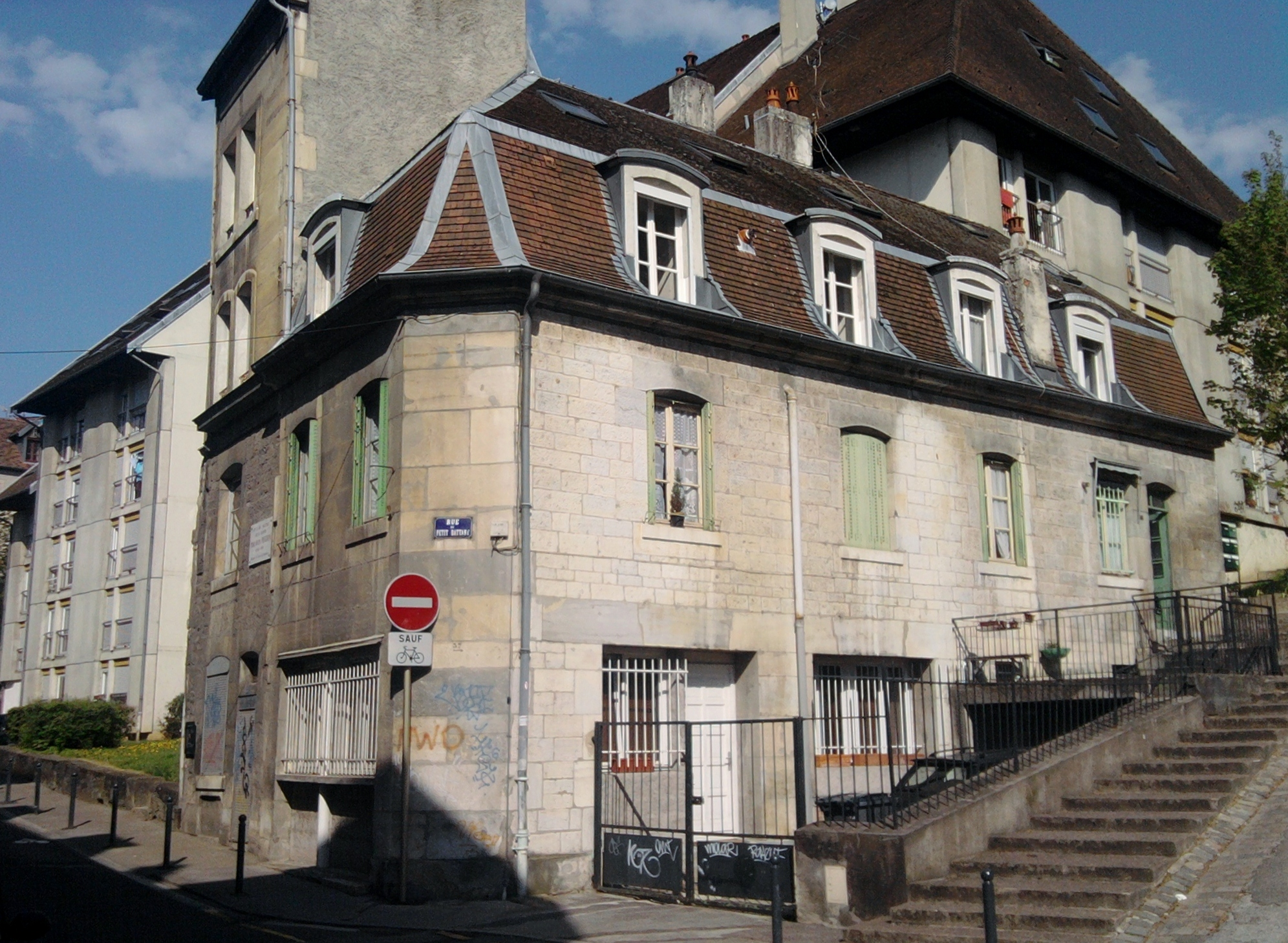
The house in Besançon in which Proudhon was born

Proudhon was born in Besançon, France, on 15 January 1809 at 23 Rue du Petit Battant in the suburb of Battant. His father Claude-François Proudhon, who worked as a brewer and a cooper, was originally from the village of Chasnans, near the border with Switzerland. His mother Catherine Simonin was from Cordiron. Claude-François and Catherine had five boys together, two of whom died at a very young age. Pierre-Joseph Proudhon's brothers Jean-Etienne and Claude were born in 1811 and 1816 respectively, and both maintained a very close relationship with him.

As a boy, he mostly worked in the family tavern, helped with basic agricultural work and spent time playing outdoors in the countryside. Although Proudhon received no formal education as a child, he was taught to read by his mother, who had him spelling words by age three. The only books that Proudhon was exposed to until he was 10 were the Gospels and the Four Aymon Brothers and some local almanacs. In 1820, Proudhon's mother began trying to get him admitted into the city college in Besançon. The family was far too poor to afford the tuition, but with the help of one of Claude-François' former employers, she managed to gain a bursary which deducted 120 francs a year from the cost. Proudhon was unable to afford basic things like books or shoes to attend school which caused him great difficulties and often made him the object of scorn by his wealthier classmates. Despite this, Proudhon showed a strong will to learn and spent much time in the school library with a pile of books, exploring a variety of subjects in his free time outside of class.

=== Entrance into the printing trade ===
In 1827, Proudhon began an apprenticeship at a printing press in the house of Bellevaux in Battant. On Easter of the following year, he transferred to a press in Besançon owned by the family of one of his schoolmates, Antoine Gauthier. Besançon was an important center of religious thought at the time and most of the works published at Gauthier were ecclesiastical works. During the course of his work, Proudhon spent hours every day reading this Christian literature and began to question many of his long-held religious beliefs which eventually led him to reject Christianity altogether. In his first book, What is Property?, he revealed that his religious journey began with Protestantism and ended with being a Neo Christian.

Over the years, Proudhon rose to be a corrector for the press, proofreading publications. By 1829, he had become more interested in social issues than in religious theory. Of particular importance during this period was his encounter with Charles Fourier, who in 1829 came to Gauthier as a customer seeking to publish his work Le Nouveau Monde Industriel et Sociétaire. Proudhon supervised the printing of the book, which gave him ample opportunity to talk with Fourier about a variety of social and philosophical issues. These discussions left a strong impression on Proudhon and influenced him throughout his life. It was also during this time that Proudhon formed one of his closest friendships with Gustave Fallot, a scholar from Montebéliard who came from a family of wealthy French industrialists. Impressed by Proudhon's corrections of one of his Latin manuscripts, Fallot sought out his friendship and the two were soon regularly spending their evenings together discussing French literature by Michel de Montaigne, François Rabelais, Jean-Jacques Rousseau, Voltaire, Denis Diderot and many other authors to whom Proudhon had not been exposed during his years of theological readings.

=== Decision to pursue philosophy and writing ===
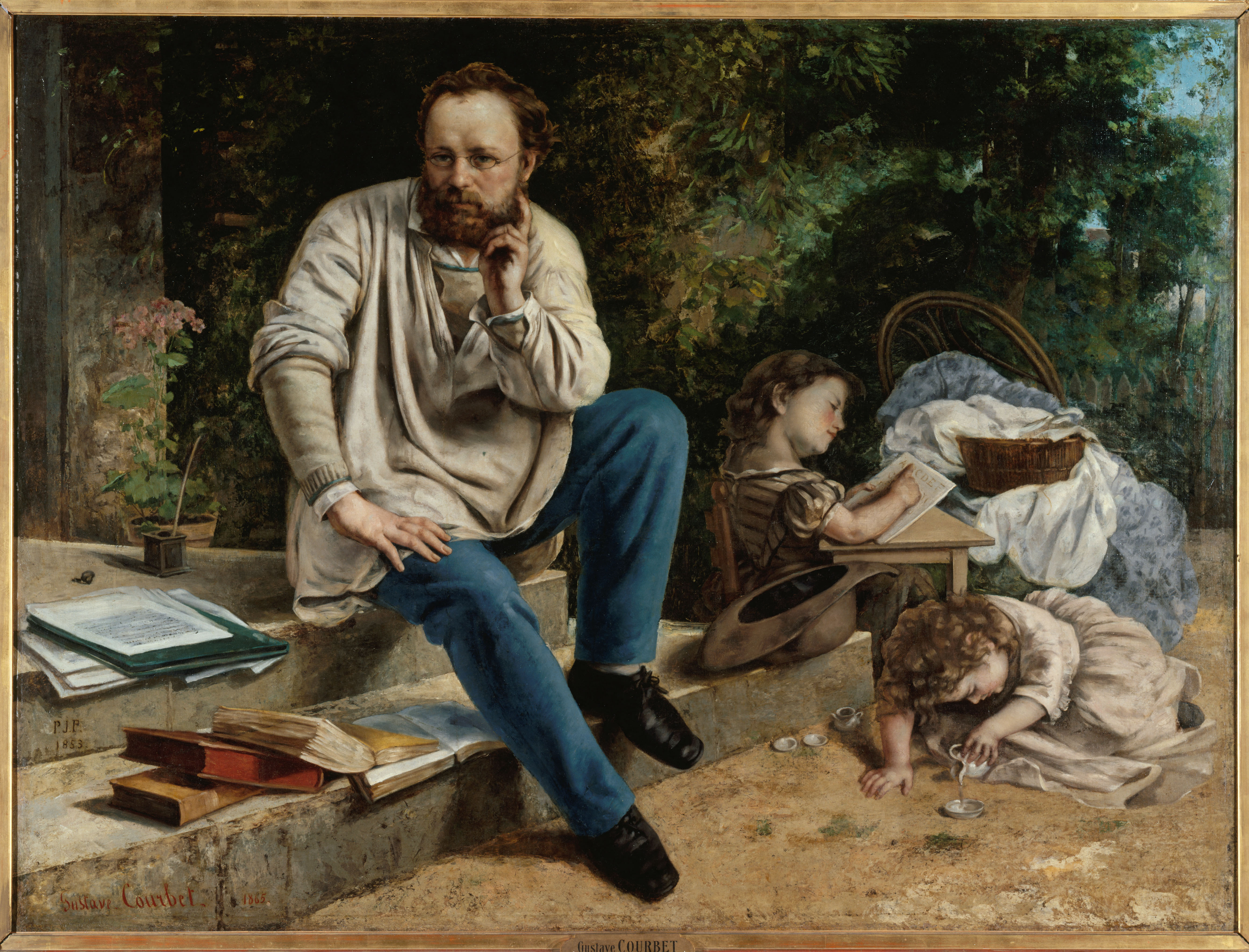
Proudhon and His Children by Gustave Courbet, 1865

In September 1830, Proudhon became certified as a journeyman compositor. The period following this was marked by unemployment and poverty, with Proudhon travelling around France (also briefly to Neuchâtel, Switzerland) where he unsuccessfully sought stable employment in printing and as a schoolteacher. During this period, Fallot offered financial assistance to Proudhon if he came to Paris to study philosophy. Proudhon accepted his offer despite concerns about how it might disrupt his career in the printing trade. He walked from Besançon to Paris, arriving in March at the Rue Mazarin in the Latin Quarter, where Fallot was living at the time. Proudhon began mingling amongst the circle of metropolitan scholars surrounding Fallot, but he felt out of place and uncomfortable amidst people who were both wealthier and more accustomed to scholarly debate. Ultimately, Proudhon found that he preferred to spend the majority of his time studying alone and was not fond of urban life, longing to return home to Besançon. The cholera outbreak in Paris granted him his wish as Fallot was struck with the illness, making him unable to financially support Proudhon any longer. After Proudhon left, he never saw Fallot (who died in 1836) again. However, this friendship was one of the most important events in Proudhon's life as it is what motivated him to leave the printing trade and pursue his studies of philosophy instead.

After an unsuccessful printing business venture in 1838, Proudhon decided to dedicate himself fully to scholarly pursuits. He applied for the Suard Pension, a bursary that would enable him to study at the Academy of Besançon. Proudhon was selected out of several candidates primarily due to the fact that his income was much lower than the others and the judges were extremely impressed by his writing and the level of education he had given himself while working as an artisan. Proudhon arrived in Paris towards the end of autumn in 1838.

=== Early writings ===
In 1839, the Academy of Besançon held an essay competition on the subject of the utility of the celebration of Sunday regarding hygiene, morality and the relationship of the family and the city. Proudhon's entry, titled De la Célébration du dimanche, essentially used the essay subject as a pretext for discussing a variety of political and philosophical ideas and in it one can find the seeds of his later revolutionary ideas. Many of his ideas on authority, morality and property disturbed the essay judges at the academy and Proudhon was only awarded the bronze medal (something in which Proudhon took pride because he felt that this was an indicator that his writing made elite academics uncomfortable).

In 1840, Proudhon published his first work Qu'est-ce que la propriété?, or What Is Property? His third memoir on property was a letter to the Fourierist writer Considérant, published in 1842 under the title Warning to Proprietors. Proudhon was tried for it at Besançon, but he was acquitted when the jury found that they could not condemn him for a philosophy that they themselves could not understand. In 1846, he published the Système des contradictions économiques ou Philosophie de la misère (The System of Economic Contradictions, or The Philosophy of Poverty) which prompted a book-length critique from Karl Marx entitled The Poverty of Philosophy, commencing a rift between anarchism and Marxism and anarchists and Marxists that would be continued by the Bakuninists and collectivist anarchists (the followers of Mikhail Bakunin) in the First International and that lasts to this day.

For some time, Proudhon ran a small printing establishment at Besançon, but without success. Afterwards, he became connected as a kind of manager with a commercial firm in Lyon, France. In 1847, he left this job and finally settled in Paris, where he was now becoming celebrated as a leader of innovation. In this year, he also became a Freemason.

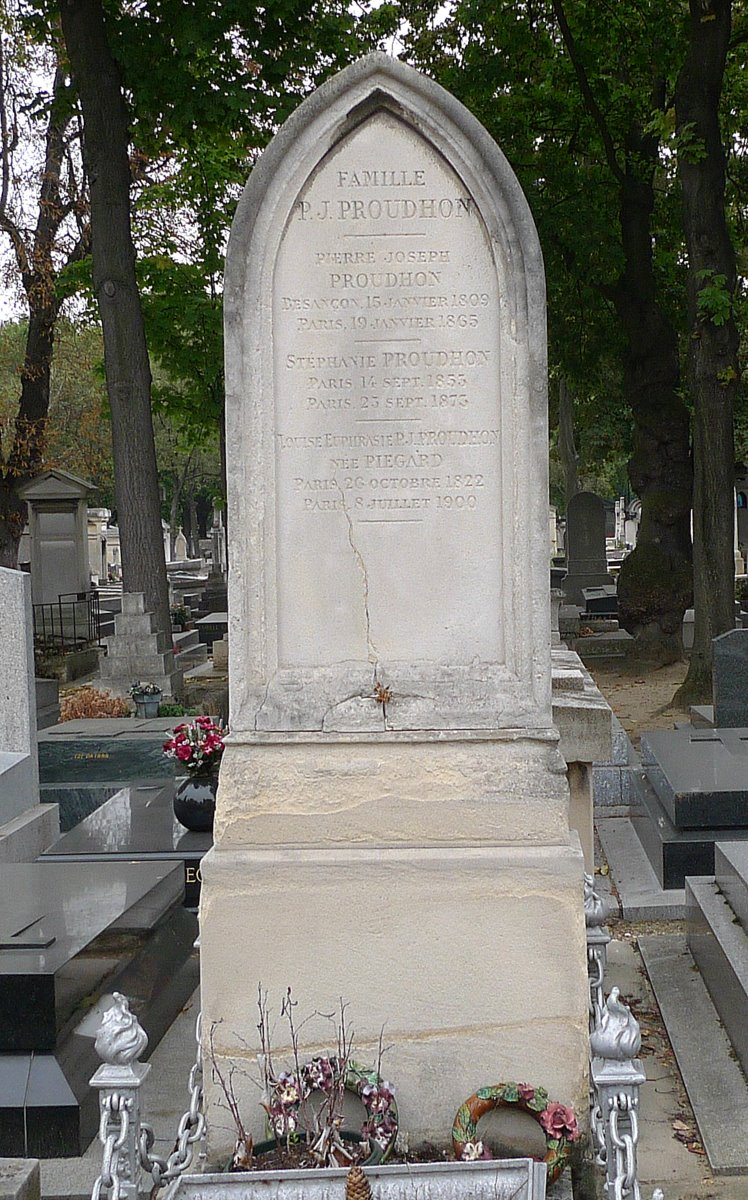
Proudhon's grave in Paris

Proudhon also engaged in an exchange of published letters between 1849 and 1850 with the French Liberal School economist Frédéric Bastiat discussing the legitimacy of interest. As Robert Leroux argued, Bastiat had the conviction that Proudhon's anti-interest doctrine "was the complete antithesis of any serious approach". Proudhon famously lost his temper and declared to Bastiat: "Your intelligence is asleep, or rather it has never been awake. You are a man for whom logic does not exist. You do not hear anything, you do not understand anything. You are without philosophy, without science, without humanity. Your ability to reason, like your ability to pay attention and make comparisons is zero. Scientifically, Mr. Bastiat, you are a dead man."

In Spain, Ramón de la Sagra established the anarchist journal El Porvenir in La Coruña in 1845 which was inspired by Proudhon's ideas. Catalan politician Francesc Pi i Margall became the principal translator of Proudhon's works into Spanish and later briefly became President of Spain in 1873 while being the leader of the Federal Democratic Republican Party. According to George Woodcock, "[t]hese translations were to have a profound and lasting effect on the development of Spanish anarchism after 1870, but before that time Proudhonian ideas, as interpreted by Pi, already provided much of the inspiration for the federalist movement which sprang up in the early 1860s". According to the Encyclopædia Britannica, "[d]uring the Spanish revolution of 1873, Pi i Margall attempted to establish a decentralized, or 'cantonalist,' political system on Proudhonian lines".

=== Later life and death ===
Proudhon died in Passy on 19 January 1865 and was buried in Paris at Montparnasse cemetery.

== Philosophy ==
=== Anarchism ===
Proudhon was the first person known to refer to himself as an "anarchist". Proudhon's anarchist mutualism is considered as a middle way or synthesis between individualist anarchism and social anarchism. According to Larry Gambone, Proudhon was a "social individualist anarchist". Both anarcho-communist Peter Kropotkin and individualist anarchist Benjamin Tucker defined anarchism as "the no-government form of socialism" and "the abolition of the State and the abolition of usury", respectively. In this, Kropotkin and Tucker were following the definition of Proudhon, who stated that "[w]e do not admit the government of man by man any more than the exploitation of man by man."

In What Is Property?, published in 1840, Proudhon defined anarchy as "the absence of a master, of a sovereign" and wrote that "[a]s man seeks justice in equality, so society seeks order in anarchy". In 1849, Proudhon declared in Confessions of a Revolutionary that "[w]hoever lays his hand on me to govern me is a usurper and tyrant, and I declare him my enemy". Proudhon was critical of state authority and supported freedom of religion, speech, and assembly. In The General Idea of the Revolution (1851), Proudhon urged a "society without authority". In a subchapter called "What is Government?", Proudhon wrote:

To be GOVERNED is to be watched, inspected, spied upon, directed, law-driven, numbered, regulated, enrolled, indoctrinated, preached at, controlled, checked, estimated, valued, censured, commanded, by creatures who have neither the right nor the wisdom nor the virtue to do so. To be GOVERNED is to be at every operation, at every transaction noted, registered, counted, taxed, stamped, measured, numbered, assessed, licensed, authorized, admonished, prevented, forbidden, reformed, corrected, punished. It is, under pretext of public utility, and in the name of the general interest, to be place[d] under contribution, drilled, fleeced, exploited, monopolized, extorted from, squeezed, hoaxed, robbed; then, at the slightest resistance, the first word of complaint, to be repressed, fined, vilified, harassed, hunted down, abused, clubbed, disarmed, bound, choked, imprisoned, judged, condemned, shot, deported, sacrificed, sold, betrayed; and to crown all, mocked, ridiculed, derided, outraged, dishonored. That is government; that is its justice; that is its morality.

Towards the end of his life, Proudhon modified some of his earlier views. In The Principle of Federation (1863), Proudhon modified his earlier anti-state position, arguing for "the balancing of authority by liberty" and put forward a decentralized "theory of federal government". Proudhon also defined anarchy differently as "the government of each by himself" which meant "that political functions have been reduced to industrial functions, and that social order arises from nothing but transactions and exchanges". This work also saw Proudhon call his economic system an "agro-industrial federation", arguing that it would provide "specific federal arrangements [...] to protect the citizens of the federated states from capitalist and financial feudalism, both within them and from the outside" and so stop the re-introduction of "wage labour". This was because "political right requires to be buttressed by economic right". In the posthumously published Theory of Property, Proudhon argued that "property is the only power that can act as a counterweight to the State". Hence, "Proudhon could retain the idea of property as theft, and at the same time offer a new definition of it as liberty. There is the constant possibility of abuse, exploitation, which spells theft. At the same time property is a spontaneous creation of society and a bulwark against the ever-encroaching power of the State."

Daniel Guérin criticized Proudhon's later life by stating that "many of these masters were not anarchists throughout their lives and their complete works include passages which have nothing to do with anarchism. To take an example: in the second part of his career Proudhon's thinking took a conservative turn. His verbose and monumental De la Justice dans la Revolution et dans l'Eglise (1858) was mainly concerned with the problem of religion and its conclusion was far from libertarian."

=== Dialectics ===
In What Is Property?, Proudhon moved on from the rejection of communism and private property in a dialectical manner, looking for a "third form of society. [...] This third form of society, the synthesis of communism and property, we will call liberty." In his System of Economic Contradiction, Proudhon described mutuality as "the synthesis of the notions of private property and collective ownership."

Proudhon's rejection of compulsory communism and privileged property led him towards a synthesis of libertarian communism and possession, just as the apparent contradiction between his theories of property represents an antithesis which still needs synthesizing. Proudhon stated that in presenting the "property is liberty" theory, he is not changing his mind about the earlier "property is theft" definition. Proudhon did not only rely on "synthesis", but also emphasized "balance" between approaches such as communism and property that apparently cannot be fully reconciled. American mutualist William Batchelder Greene took a similar approach in his 1849–1850 works.

=== Free association ===
For Proudhon, mutualism involved free association by creating industrial democracy, a system where workplaces would be "handed over to democratically organised workers' associations. [...] We want these associations to be models for agriculture, industry and trade, the pioneering core of that vast federation of companies and societies woven into the common cloth of the democratic social Republic." Under mutualism, workers would no longer sell their labour to a capitalist but rather work for themselves in co-operatives. Proudhon urged "workers to form themselves into democratic societies, with equal conditions for all members, on pain of a relapse into feudalism". This would result in "[c]apitalistic and proprietary exploitation, stopped everywhere, the wage system abolished, equal and just exchange guaranteed".

As Robert Graham notes, "Proudhon's market socialism is indissolubly linked to his notions of industrial democracy and workers' self-management". K. Steven Vincent notes in his in-depth analysis of this aspect of Proudhon's ideas that "Proudhon consistently advanced a program of industrial democracy which would return control and direction of the economy to the workers". For Proudhon, "strong workers' associations [...] would enable the workers to determine jointly by election how the enterprise was to be directed and operated on a day-to-day basis".

=== Mutualism ===
Proudhon adopted the term mutualism for his brand of anarchism and socialism which involved control of the means of production by the workers. In his vision, self-employed artisans, peasants and cooperatives would trade their products on the market. For Proudhon, factories and other large workplaces would be run by "labor associations" operating on directly democratic principles. The state would be abolished and instead society would be organized by a federation of "free communes" (a commune is a local municipality in French). In 1863, Proudhon wrote: "All my economic ideas as developed over twenty-five years can be summed up in the words: agricultural-industrial federation. All my political ideas boil down to a similar formula: political federation or decentralization".

Proudhon called this use-ownership possession (possession) and this economic system mutualism (mutualisme), having many arguments against entitlement to land and capital, including reasons based on morality, economics, politics and individual liberty. One such argument was that it enabled profit which in turn led to social instability and war by creating cycles of debt that eventually overcame the capacity of labor to pay them off. Another was that it produced despotism and turned workers into wage workers subject to the authority of a boss. In What Is Property?, Proudhon described the liberty he pursued as "the synthesis of communism and property", further writing:

Property, acting by exclusion and encroachment, while population was increasing, has been the life-principle and definitive cause of all revolutions. Religious wars, and wars of conquest, when they have stopped short of the extermination of races, have been only accidental disturbances, soon repaired by the mathematical progression of the life of nations. The downfall and death of societies are due to the power of accumulation possessed by property.

Proudhon continued to oppose both capitalist and state property. In Theory of Property, Proudhon maintained that "[n]ow in 1840, I categorically rejected the notion of property for both the group and the individual", but then he also states his new theory of property that "property is the greatest revolutionary force which exists, with an unequaled capacity for setting itself against authority" and the "principal function of private property within the political system will be to act as a counterweight to the power of the State, and by so doing to insure the liberty of the individual". However, the authors of An Anarchist FAQ write that "this is a common anarchist position. Anarchists are well aware that possession is a source of independence within capitalism and so should be supported". At the same time, Proudhon continued to oppose concentrations of wealth and property, arguing for small-scale property ownership associated with peasants and artisans. Proudhon also still opposed private property in land, writing: "What I cannot accept, regarding land, is that the work put in gives a right to ownership of what has been worked on." In addition, Proudhon still believed that property should be more equally distributed and limited in size to that actually used by individuals, families and workers associations. Proudhon supported the right of inheritance and defended it "as one of the foundations of the family and society", but he refused to extend this beyond personal possessions, arguing that "[u]nder the law of association, transmission of wealth does not apply to the instruments of labour".

As a consequence of his opposition to profit, wage labour, worker exploitation, ownership of land and capital as well as to state property, Proudhon rejected both capitalism and state socialism, including authoritarian socialism and other authoritarian and compulsory forms of communism which advocated state property. The authors of An Anarchist FAQ argue that his opposition to "communism" was because "libertarian communism", while having some forerunners such as François-Noël Babeuf, would not be as widespread until after his death and so, like Max Stirner, "he was directing his critique against the various forms of state communism which did [exist]". While opposed to the charging of interest and rent, Proudhon did not seek to abolish them by law, writing: "I protest that when I criticized the complex of institutions of which property is the foundation stone, I never meant to forbid or suppress, by sovereign decree, ground rent and interest on capital. I think that all these manifestations of human activity should remain free and voluntary for all: I ask for them no modifications, restrictions or suppressions, other than those which result naturally and of necessity from the universalization of the principle of reciprocity which I propose."

=== Nationalism ===
Proudhon opposed dictatorship, militarism, nationalism and war, arguing that the "end of militarism is the mission of the nineteenth century, under pain of indefinite decadence" and that the "workers alone are capable of putting an end to war by creating economic equilibrium. This presupposes a radical revolution in ideas and morals." As Robert L. Hoffman notes, War and Peace "ends by condemning war without reservation" and its "conclusion [is] that war is obsolete". Marxist philosopher John Ehrenberg summarized Proudhon's position that "[i]f injustice was the cause of war, it followed that conflict could not be eliminated until society was reorganised along egalitarian lines. Proudhon had wanted to prove that the reign of political economy would be the reign of peace, finding it difficult to believe that people really thought he was defending militarism."

Proudhon argued that under mutualism "[t]here will no longer be nationality, no longer fatherland, in the political sense of the words: they will mean only places of birth. Man, of whatever race or colour he may be, is an inhabitant of the universe; citizenship is everywhere an acquired right." Proudhon also rejected dictatorship, stating in the 1860s that "what I will always be [...] a republican, a democrat even, and a socialist into the bargain". Henri-Marie de Lubac argued that in terms of Proudhon's critique of democracy "we must not allow all this to hoodwink us. His invectives against democracy were not those of a counter-revolutionary. They were aimed at what he himself called 'the false democracy'. [...] They attacked an apparently liberal 'pseudo-democracy' which 'was not economic and social', [...] 'a Jacobinical democracy.'" Proudhon "did not want to destroy, but complete, the work of 1789" and while "he had a grudge against the 'old democracy', the democracy of Robespierre and Marat", he repeatedly contrasted it "with a 'young democracy', which was a 'social democracy.'"

According to historian of anarchism George Woodcock, some positions Proudhon took "sorted oddly with his avowed anarchism". Woodcock cited as an example Proudhon's proposition that each citizen perform one or two years militia service. The proposal appeared in the Programme Revolutionaire, an electoral manifesto issued by Proudhon after he was asked to run for a position in the provisional government. The text reads: "7° 'L'armée. – Abolition immédiate de la conscription et des remplacements; obligation pour tout citoyen de faire, pendant un ou deux ans, le service militaire; application de l'armée aux services administratifs et travaux d'utilité publique" ("Military service by all citizens is proposed as an alternative to conscription and the practice of 'replacement', by which those who could avoided such service"). In the same document, Proudhon also described the "form of government" he was proposing as "a centralization analogous with that of the State, but in which no one obeys, no one is dependent, and everyone is free and sovereign".

=== Private property and the state ===
Proudhon advocated the destruction of the centralized state, thus enunciating a central tenet of anarchism. He wrote: "When the mass of the People becomes the State, the State has no longer any reason to exist [...]."

Proudhon saw the privileged property as a form of government that was necessarily backed by and interlinked with the state, writing that "[t]he private property of privilege called forth and commanded the State" and arguing that "since the first related to the landowner and capitalist whose ownership derived from conquest or exploitation and was only maintained through the state, its property laws, police and army". Hence, Proudhon distinguished between personal property, possessions (possession) and private property (propriété), i.e. productive property while the former having direct use-value to the individual possessing it. Unlike capitalist property supporters, Proudhon stressed equality and thought that all workers should own property and have access to capital, stressing that in every cooperative "every worker employed in the association [must have] an undivided share in the property of the company". In his later works, Proudhon used property to mean possession. This resulted in some individualist anarchists such as Benjamin Tucker calling possession as property or private property, causing confusion within the anarchist movement and among other socialists.

In his earliest works, Proudhon analyzed the nature and problems of the capitalist economy. While deeply critical of capitalism, Proudhon also objected to those contemporary in the socialist movement who advocated centralized hierarchical forms of association or state control of the economy. In a sequence of commentaries from What Is Property? (1840), posthumously published in the Théorie de la propriété (Theory of Property, 1863–1864), Proudhon declared in turn that "property is theft", "property is impossible", "property is despotism" and "property is freedom". When saying that "property is theft", Proudhon was referring to the landowner or capitalist who he believed "stole" the profits from laborers. For Proudhon, as he wrote in the sixth study of his General Idea of the Revolution in the Nineteenth Century, the capitalist's employee was "subordinated, exploited: his permanent condition is one of obedience". In What Is Property?, Proudhon also wrote:

Property is physically and mathematically impossible.

Property is impossible, because it demands something for nothing.
Property is impossible because wherever it exists production costs more than it is worth.
Property is impossible, because, with a given capital, production is proportional to labor, not to property.
Property is impossible, because it is homicide.
Yes, I have attacked property, and shall attack it again.
Property is robbery.

The people finally legalized property. God forgive them, for they knew not what they did!

Proudhon believed that illegitimate property was based on dominion (i.e. entitlement) and that this was backed by force. While this force can take the form of police in the employ of a state, it is the fact of its enforcement, not its form, that makes it what it is. Proudhon rejected entitlement regardless of the source and accepted possession based on occupancy. According to Proudhon, "[t]here are different kinds of property: 1. Property pure and simple, the dominant and seigniorial power over a thing; or, as they term it, naked property. 2. Possession. 'Possession,' says Duranton, 'is a matter of fact, not of right.' Toullier: 'Property is a right, a legal power; possession is a fact.' The tenant, the farmer, the commandité, the usufructuary, are possessors; the owner who lets and lends for use, the heir who is to come into possession on the death of a usufructuary, are proprietors."

The underlying cause of this oppression, Proudhon argues, is the existence of state-backed property rights. Property, in his view, is both theft and freedom. It is theft when one person owns the property that others need to survive. Property is theft when the person who owns it can own it without occupying it and can derive rent, income, and profit simply because they hold legal title. It is this form of property that allows a minority of property owners to control a majority of citizens, who are forever in debt simply because they don't hold "title." In this sense, property enabled a form of enslavement of the propertyless by the propertied minority. It is this enslavement that Proudhon's anarchism seeks to challenge. [...] What is needed is a property regime that enables freedom for all. The best way of guaranteeing freedom for all, Proudhon argues, is for each person or small group to own their own means of production. Property is legitimate when it is co-extensive with possession. Proudhon objects not to property per se, but to large accumulations.

Therefore, Proudhon acknowledged the forms of ownership that individuals directly use (e.g. the house they live in, the tools they use, etc.), but he viewed negatively productive ownership (propriété) that is formed in a way that subordinates others. What Proudhon was criticizing was that if a few people have exclusive ownership of these resources, the owners can exert power over the non-owners and exercise control over what they own over the many simply by virtue of their ownership, and the many must pay their own costs (rent, interest, wage labor, etc.) in order to use the resources according to the rules set by the owners.

That is, it points out the structure of unearned income such as rent, interest, and capitalist profit, which allows the owner to make money by having power simply because he or she has legal ownership without directly working and without occupying the property.

In Confessions of a Revolutionary, Proudhon also wrote:

"Capital" [...] in the political field is analogous to "government". [...] The economic idea of capitalism, the politics of government or of authority, and the theological idea of the Church are three identical ideas, linked in various ways. To attack one of them is equivalent to attacking all of them. [...] What capital does to labour, and the State to liberty, the Church does to the spirit. This trinity of absolutism is as baneful in practice as it is in philosophy. The most effective means for oppressing the people would be simultaneously to enslave its body, its will and its reason.

In asserting that property is freedom, Proudhon was referring not only to the product of an individual's labor, but also to the peasant or artisan's home and tools of his trade and the income he received by selling his goods. For Proudhon, the only legitimate source of property is labor. What one produces is one's property and anything beyond that is not. Proudhon advocated workers' self-management and was opposed to the private ownership of the means of production. In 1848, Proudhon wrote:

Under the law of association, transmission of wealth does not apply to the instruments of labour, so cannot become a cause of inequality. [...] We are socialists [...] under universal association, ownership of the land and of the instruments of labour is social ownership. [...] We want the mines, canals, railways handed over to democratically organised workers' associations. [...] We want these associations to be models for agriculture, industry and trade, the pioneering core of that vast federation of companies and societies, joined together in the common bond of the democratic and social Republic.

Proudhon also warned that a society with private property would lead to statist relations between people, arguing:

The purchaser draws boundaries, fences himself in, and says, 'This is mine; each one by himself, each one for himself.' Here, then, is a piece of land upon which, henceforth, no one has right to step, save the proprietor and his friends; which can benefit nobody, save the proprietor and his servants. Let these multiply, and soon the people [...] will have nowhere to rest, no place of shelter, no ground to till. They will die of hunger at the proprietor's door, on the edge of that property which was their birth-right; and the proprietor, watching them die, will exclaim, 'So perish idlers and vagrants.'

According to Proudhon, "[t]he proprietor, the robber, the hero, the sovereign—for all these titles are synonymous—imposes his will as law, and suffers neither contradiction nor control; that is, he pretends to be the legislative and the executive power at once [...] [and so] property engenders despotism. [...] That is so clearly the essence of property that, to be convinced of it, one need but remember what it is, and observe what happens around him. Property is the right to use and abuse. [...] [I]f goods are property, why should not the proprietors be kings, and despotic kings—kings in proportion to their facultes bonitaires? And if each proprietor is sovereign lord within the sphere of his property, absolute king throughout his own domain, how could a government of proprietors be any thing but chaos and confusion?"

=== Property ===
George Crowder writes that the property anarchists including Proudhon oppose "is basically that which is unearned", i.e. "such things as interest on loans and income from rent. This is contrasted with ownership rights in those goods either produced by the work of the owner or necessary for that work, for example his dwelling-house, land and tools. Proudhon initially refers to legitimate rights of ownership of these goods as 'possession,' and although in his latter work he calls this 'property,' the conceptual distinction remains the same."

Late in his life, Proudhon argued for increasing the powers of government while also strengthening property, by making it more egalitarian and widespread, in order to counter-balance it. Iain McKay points out that "Proudhon's 'emphasis on the genuine antagonism between state power and property rights' came from his later writings, in which he argued that property rights were required to control state power. In other words, this 'heterodoxy' came from a period in which Proudhon did not think that state could be abolished and so 'property is the only power that can act as a counterweight to the State.' Of course, this 'later' Proudhon also acknowledged that property was 'an absolutism within an absolutism,' 'by nature autocratic' and that its 'politics could be summed up in a single word,' namely 'exploitation.'" McKay further writes how "Proudhon argues that 'spread[ing] it more equally and establish[ing] it more firmly in society' is the means by which 'property' 'becomes a guarantee of liberty and keeps the State on an even keel.' In other words, rather than 'property' as such limiting the state, it is 'property' divided equally through society which is the key, without concentrations of economic power and inequality which would result in exploitation and oppression. Therefore, '[s]imple justice... requires that equal division of land shall not only operate at the outset. If there is to be no abuse, it must be maintained from generation to generation.'"

David Hargreaves writes that "[i]ronically, Proudhon did not mean literally what he said. His boldness of expression was intended for emphasis, and by 'property' he wished to be understood what he later called 'the sum of its abuses'. He was denouncing the property of the man who uses it to exploit the labour of others without any effort on his own part, property distinguished by interest and rent, by the impositions of the non-producer on the producer. Towards property regarded as 'possession' the right of a man to control his dwelling and the land and tools he needs to live, Proudhon had no hostility; indeed, he regarded it as the cornerstone of liberty, and his main criticism of the communists was that they wished to destroy it."

=== Revolution ===
While Proudhon identified as a revolutionary, his idea of revolution did not entail civil war or violent upheaval, but rather the transformation of society. This transformation was essentially moral in nature and demanded the highest ethics from those who sought change. It was monetary reform, combined with organizing a credit bank and workers associations, that Proudhon proposed to use as a lever to bring about the organization of society along new lines. This ethical socialism has been described as part of the liberal socialist tradition which is for egalitarianism and free markets, with Proudhon, among other anarchists, taking "a commitment to narrow down the sphere of activity of the state". James Boyle quotes Proudhon as stating that socialism is "every aspiration towards the amelioration of society" and then admitting that "we are all socialists" under this definition.

On the 1848 French Revolution and the Second French Republic, Proudhon took a radical stance regarding the National Workshops, criticized for being charity whilst criticizing the June Days Uprising for using violence. Proudhon's criticism of the February Revolution was that it was "without an idea" and considered some parts of the revolution too moderate and others too radical. According to Shawn Wilbur, those contradictions were caused by his dialectical phase with the System of Economic Contradictions and was prone to viewing nearly all his key concepts as being worked out in terms of irreducible contradictions.

Although the revolutionary concept of dual power was first used by Vladimir Lenin, it was conceptually first outlined by Proudhon. According to Murray Bookchin, "Proudhon made the bright suggestion, in his periodical Le Représentant du peuple (28 April 1848), that the mass democracy of the clubs could become a popular forum where the social agenda of the revolution could be prepared for use by the Constituent Assembly—a proposal that would essentially have defused the potency of the clubs as a potentially rebellious dual power."

=== Socialism ===
Proudhon self-identified as a socialist, and remains widely recognized as such. As one of the first theorists of libertarian socialism, Proudhon opposed state ownership of capital goods in favour of ownership by workers themselves in associations. Proudhon was one of the main influences on the theory of workers' self-management (autogestion) in the late 19th and 20th century. Proudhon strenuously rejected the ownership of the products of labor by capitalists or the state, arguing in What Is Property? that while "property in product [...] does not carry with it property in the means of production", "[t]he right to product is exclusive" and "the right to means is common". Proudhon applied this to the land ("the land is [...] a common thing") and workplaces ("all accumulated capital being social property, no one can be its exclusive proprietor"). Proudhon argued that while society owned the means of production or land, users would control and run them (under supervision from society) with the "organising of regulating societies" in order to "regulate the market".

By the 1840s and 1850s, socialism came to cover a broad range. Proudhon's writings from the years following the French Revolution of 1848 are full of passages in which he associated himself with socialism, but he distanced from any particular system of socialist economics or type of socialism. As a broad concept, socialism is one or more of various theories aimed at solving the labor problem through radical changes in the capitalist economy. Descriptions of the problem, explanations of its causes and proposed solutions such as abolition of private property and support of either cooperatives, collective property, common property, public property or social property varied among socialist philosophies.

Proudhon made no public criticism of Karl Marx or Marxism because in Proudhon's lifetime Marx was relatively unknown. It was only after Proudhon's death that Marxism became a large movement. However, he criticized authoritarian and state socialists of his period. This included the French socialist Louis Blanc, of whom Proudhon said that "you desire neither Catholicism nor monarchy nor nobility, but you must have a God, a religion, a dictatorship, a censorship, a hierarchy, distinctions, and ranks. For my part, I deny your God, your authority, your sovereignty, your judicial State, and all your representative mystifications." It was Proudhon's book What Is Property? that convinced the young Marx that private property should be abolished. In The Holy Family, one of his first works, Marx stated: "Not only does Proudhon write in the interest of the proletarians, he is himself a proletarian, an ouvrier. His work is a scientific manifesto of the French proletariat." However, Marx disagreed with Proudhon's anarchism and later published a vicious criticism of Proudhon. Marx wrote The Poverty of Philosophy as a refutation of Proudhon's The Philosophy of Poverty. In their letters, Proudhon expressed disagreement with Marx's views on revolution, stating: "I believe we have no need of it in order to succeed; and that consequently we should not put forward revolutionary action as a means of social reform, because that pretended means would simply be an appeal to force, to arbitrariness, in brief, a contradiction."

More than Proudhon's anarchism, Marx did take issue with what he saw as Proudhon's misunderstanding of the relationship between labor, value and price as well as believing that Proudhon's attack on bourgeois property was framed in terms of bourgeois ethics rather than transcending these ethics altogether. Anarchists, among others, have since criticized Marx and Marxists for having distorted Proudhon's views. Iain McKay argues that Marx took many concepts such as his criticism of private property, scientific socialism and surplus value from Proudhon. Similarly, Rudolf Rocker argued that "we find 'the theory of surplus value, that grand 'scientific discovery' of which our Marxists are so proud of, in the writings of Proudhon.'" Edward Hyams summarized that "since [The Poverty of Philosophy] no good Marxists have had to think about Proudhon. They have what is mother's milk to them, an ex cathedra judgement." In spite of their personal diatribes, Marx always maintained a certain respect for Proudhon, although this did not stop Marx from expelling Proudhon's follower Mikhail Bakunin (in spite of his criticism of Proudhon) and his supporters from the First International. In his obituary of Proudhon which was written on 24 January 1865, almost two decades after The Poverty of Philosophy, Marx called What Is Property? "epoch-making".

=== Social ownership ===
While favoring individual ownership for small-property holdings, Proudhon advocated social ownership and worker cooperatives or similar workers' associations and workers' councils. Proudhon advocated industrial democracy and repeatedly argued for the socialization of the means of production and of land. In What Is Property?, Proudhon wrote that "land is indispensable to our existence, consequently a common thing, consequently insusceptible of appropriation". In a letter to Louis Blanqui in 1841, Proudhon wrote that "all capital, whether material or mental, being the result of collective labour, is, in consequence, collective property".

In his election manifesto for the 1848 French Constituent Assembly election, Proudhon wrote:

For this value or wealth, produced by the activity of all, is by the very fact of its creation collective wealth, the use of which, like that of the land, may be divided, but which as property remains undivided. [...] In short, property in capital is indivisible, and consequently inalienable, not necessarily when the capital is uncreated, but when it is common or collective. [...] [T]his non-appropriation of the instruments of production [...] I, in accordance with all precedent, call [...] a destruction of property. In fact, without the appropriation of instruments, property is nothing.

In a letter to Pierre Leroux in 1849, Proudhon wrote:

Under the law of association, transmission of wealth does not apply to the instruments of labour, so cannot become a cause of inequality. [...] We are socialists [...] under universal association, ownership of the land and of the instruments of labour is social ownership. [...] You have me saying, and I really do not know where you could have found this, that ownership of the instruments of labour must forever stay vested in the individual and remain unorganised. These words are set in italics, as if you had lifted them from somewhere in my books. [...] But it does not follow at all [...] that I want to see individual ownership and non-organisation of the instruments of labour endure for all eternity. I have never penned nor uttered any such thing: and have argued the opposite a hundred times over. [...] I deny all kinds of proprietary domain. I deny it, precisely because I believe in an order wherein the instruments of labour will cease to be appropriated and instead become shared; where the whole earth will be depersonalised.

== Controversial positions ==
=== Proto-fascism ===
Although long considered a founding father of anarchism and part of the French Left, some have tried to link him to the extreme right. He was first used as a reference in the Cercle Proudhon, a right-wing association formed in 1911 by Georges Valois and Edouard Berth. Both had been brought together by the syndicalist Georges Sorel, but they would tend toward a synthesis of socialism and nationalism, mixing Proudhon's mutualism with Charles Maurras' integralist nationalism. In 1925, Georges Valois founded the Faisceau, the first fascist league, which took its name from Benito Mussolini's fasci. Zeev Sternhell, historian of fascism and in particular of French fascists, noted this use of Proudhon by the far right:

[T]he Action Française [...] from its inception regarded the author of La philosophie de la misère as one of its masters. He was given a place of honour in the weekly section of the journal of the movement entitled, precisely, 'Our Masters.' Proudhon owed this place in L'Action française to what the Maurrassians saw as his antirepublicanism, his anti-Semitism, his loathing of Rousseau, his disdain for the French Revolution, democracy, and parliamentarianism: and his championship of the nation, the family, tradition, and the monarchy.

In response, K. Steven Vincent states that "to argue that Proudhon was a proto-fascist suggests that one has never looked seriously at Proudhon's writings". Proudhon had great influence on the anarchist and non-anarchist socialist movement. In the United States, Proudhon was influential within radical progressive sectors and labour leaders, among them individualist anarchists such as Joseph Labadie, Dyer Lum and Benjamin Tucker. In France, Proudhon's influence on French socialism, including the Paris Commune, was surpassed by Marxist socialism only at the beginning of the 20th century. Proudhonists made up an important French faction in the First International and Proudhon's thought strongly influenced debate in French and Belgian socialist circles long before the Cercle Proudhon. George Woodcock stated that "Sorel, whose ideas were most fully developed in his Reflections on Violence, had no direct connection with the syndicalist movement, and he was repudiated."

Anarchist Albert Meltzer has argued that although Proudhon used the term anarchist, he was not one and that he never engaged in "anarchist activity or struggle", but rather in "parliamentary activity".

In 1945, J. Salwyn Schapiro wrote an article titled Pierre Joseph Proudhon, Harbinger of Fascism with the goal of showing that Proudhon "was a harbinger of fascist ideas". A rebuttal to Schapiro's article, written by the Italian anti-fascist Nicola Chiaromonte, was published in January 1946. In 2021 the anarchist and Proudhon scholar Iain McKay published a detailed critique of Schapiro's claims. In his study on the relationship between Proudhon's thought and the ideology of the Third Reich, historian Frédéric Krier came to the conclusions that, despite some similarities, major elements of his thinking, such as his advocacy for federalism and his critique of nationalism and caesarism, also put him clearly at odds with it.

A number of other Proudhon scholars have explicitly rejected the idea that Proudhon could reasonably be considered a fascist.

=== Antisemitism ===
Stewart Edwards, the editor of the Selected Writings of Pierre-Joseph Proudhon, remarks that "Proudhon's diaries (Carnets, ed. P. Haubtmann, Marcel Rivière, Paris 1960 to date) reveal that he had almost paranoid feelings of hatred against the Jews. In 1847, he considered publishing an article against the Jewish race, which he said he 'hated'. The proposed article would have "called for the expulsion of the Jews from France". It would have stated: "The Jew is the enemy of the human race. This race must be sent back to Asia, or exterminated. H. Heine, A. Weil, and others are simply secret spies; Rothschild, Crémieux, Marx, Fould, evil choleric, envious, bitter men who hate us." Proudhon differentiated his antisemitism from that of the Middle Ages, presenting it as quasi-scientific: "What the peoples of the Middle Ages hated by instinct, I hate upon reflection and irrevocably."

In 1945, J. Salwyn Schapiro argued that Proudhon was a racist, "a glorifier of war for its own sake" and that his "advocacy of personal dictatorship and his laudation of militarism can hardly be equalled in the reactionary writings of his or of our day". Other scholars have rejected Schapiro's claims. Robert Graham states that while Proudhon was personally racist, "anti-semitism formed no part of Proudhon's revolutionary programme".

In an introduction to Proudhon's works titled Property Is Theft! A Pierre-Joseph Proudhon Anthology, Iain McKay, author of An Anarchist FAQ, cautions readers by saying that "[t]his is not to say that Proudhon was without flaws, for he had many" and adding the following note:

He was not consistently libertarian in his ideas, tactics and language. His personal bigotries are disgusting and few modern anarchists would tolerate them—namely, racism and sexism. He made some bad decisions and occasionally ranted in his private notebooks (where the worst of his anti-Semitism was expressed). While he did place his defence of the patriarchal family at the core of his ideas, they are in direct contradiction to his own libertarian and egalitarian ideas. In terms of racism, he sometimes reflected the less-than-enlightened assumptions and prejudices of the nineteenth century. While this does appear in his public work, such outbursts are both rare and asides (usually an extremely infrequent passing anti-Semitic remark or caricature). In short, "racism was never the basis of Proudhon's political thinking" (Gemie, 200–201) and "anti-Semitism formed no part of Proudhon's revolutionary programme." (Robert Graham, "Introduction", General Idea of the Revolution, xxxvi) To quote Proudhon: "There will no longer be nationality, no longer fatherland, in the political sense of the words: they will mean only places of birth. Man, of whatever race or colour he may be, is an inhabitant of the universe; citizenship is everywhere an acquired right." (General Idea of the Revolution, 283)

=== Anti-feminism ===
Proudhon expressed strongly patriarchal views on women's nature and their proper role in the family and society at large. In his Carnets (Notebooks), unpublished until the 1960s, Proudhon maintained that a woman's choice was to be "courtesan or housekeeper". To a woman, a man is "a father, a chief, a master: above all, a master". His justification for patriarchy was men's assumed greater physical strength, and he recommended that men use this strength to subordinate women, saying that "[a] woman does not at all hate being used with violence, indeed even being violated". In her study of Gustave Courbet, who painted the portrait of Proudhon and His Children (1865), art historian Linda Nochlin points out that alongside his early articulations of anarchism Proudhon also wrote La Pornocratie ou les femmes dans les temps modernes, described as "the most consistent anti-feminist tract of its time, or perhaps, any other" and which "raises all the main issues about woman's position in society and her sexuality with a paranoid intensity unmatched in any other text".

Proudhon's defense of patriarchy did not go unchallenged in his lifetime; libertarian communist Joseph Déjacque attacked Proudhon's anti-feminism as a contradiction of anarchist principles. Déjacque directed Proudhon "either to 'speak out against man's exploitation of woman' or 'do not describe yourself as an anarchist'".

== Works ==
- Qu'est ce que la propriété? (What Is Property?, 1840)
- Avertissement aux Propriétaires (Warning to Proprietors, 1842)
- De la création de l'ordre dans l'humanité ou principes d'organisation politique (Of the creation of order in humanity or principles of political organization, 1843)
- Système des contradictions économiques ou Philosophie de la misère (The System of Economic Contradictions, or The Philosophy of Poverty, 1846)
- Solution du problème social (Solution of the Social Problem, 1849)
- Idée générale de la révolution au XIXe siècle (General Idea of the Revolution in the Nineteenth Century, 1851)
- Le manuel du spéculateur à la bourse (The Manual of the Stock Exchange Speculator, 1853)
- Philosophie du progrès (Philosophy of Progress, 1853)
- De la justice dans la révolution et dans l'Eglise (Of Justice in the Revolution and the Church, 1858)
- La Guerre et la Paix (War and Peace, 1861)
- Du principe Fédératif (Principle of Federation, 1863)
- De la capacité politique des classes ouvrières (Of the Political Capacity of the Working Class, 1865)
- Théorie de la propriété (Theory of Property, 1866)
- Théorie du mouvement constitutionnel (Theory of the Constitutionalist Movement, 1870)
- Du principe de l'art (The Principle of Art, 1875)
- Correspondence (Correspondences, 1875)
- La Pornocratie ou les femmes dans les temps modernes (The Pornocracy or the women in modern times, 1875, posthumously)

== See also ==
- Cost the limit of price
- Market anarchism
- Market socialism
- Socialist economics
- Workers' self-management

== Bibliography ==
- Ehrenberg, John (1996). Proudhon and His Age. Humanities Press. ISBN 978-0391038912.
- Hoffman, Robert Louis (1972). Revolutionary Justice: The Social and Political Theory of P.-J. Proudhon. University of Illinois Press. ISBN 978-0252002403.
- de Lubac, Henri (1978) [1948]. The Un-Marxian Socialist: A Study of Proudhon. Octagon Books.
- Schapiro, Jacob Salwyn (July 1945). "Pierre Joseph Proudhon, Harbinger of Fascism". The American Historical Review. 50 (4). Oxford University Press: 714–737. doi:10.2307/1842699. ISSN 0002-8762. JSTOR 1842699. OCLC 5545163007.
- Vincent, K. Stephen (1984). Pierre-Joseph Proudhon and the Rise of French Republican Socialism. Oxford University Press. ISBN 978-0195034134.
- Woodcock, George (1972). Pierre-Joseph Proudhon: His Life and Work. Schocken Books. ISBN 0805203729.
