= Journal des économistes =

The Journal des Économistes was a nineteenth-century French academic journal on political economy. It was founded in 1841 and published by Gilbert Guillaumin (1801–1864). Among its editors were Gustave de Molinari and Yves Guyot. It featured contributions of Léon Walras, Frédéric Bastiat, Charles Renouard and Vilfredo Pareto, among many other eminent economists. The publication of the journal was halted just after the start of the Second World War, in March/April 1940.

== See also ==
- French Liberal School
