= J. Salwyn Schapiro =

Jacob Salwyn Schapiro (December 19, 1879 – December 30, 1973) was a professor emeritus of History at the City College of New York.

== Work ==
In his book, Liberalism and the Challenge of Fascism, Schapiro set out to discuss the changes in both England and France. Schapiro contrasted the smooth evolution of liberalism in England to the violent swings back and forth between reaction and liberal forces in France. This historical violent dialectic in France, in Schapiro's argument, was what created the basic ideas of Nazism.

Schapiro's Definition of Fascism

"It would be a great error to regard fascism as a counterrevolutionary movement directed against the communists, as was that of the reactionaries against the liberals during the first half of the nineteenth century. Fascism is something unique in modern history, in that it is a revolutionary movement of the middle class directed, on the one hand, against the great banks and big business and, on the other hand, against the revolutionary demands of the working class. It repudiates democracy as a political system in which the bankers, capitalists, and socialists find free scope for their activities, and it favors a dictatorship that will eliminate these elements from the life of the nation. Fascism proclaims a body of doctrines that are not entirely new; there are no "revelations" in history."

One thinker whose views Schapiro felt were proto-fascist was French anarchist Pierre-Joseph Proudhon (1809–1865). This interpretation of Proudhon's philosophy was strongly challenged by Italian activist and author Nicola Chiaromonte, however.

== Quotes ==
- "As nature abhors a vacuum, history abhors changes without origins, whether immediate or remote. Fascism did not spring fully grown from the chin of Mussolini".
  —Liberalism and the Challenge of Fascism, pg 322

== Writings ==
- Modern and Contemporary European History, (1815–1928), publisher: Houghton Mifflin Co., The Riverside Press, Cambridge, MA, 1929.
- Liberalism and the Challenge of Fascism, Social Forces in England and France, (1815–1870), publisher: McGraw-Hill Book Company, Inc., NY, 1949.
- "Condorcet and the Rise of Liberalism", publisher:Harcourt, Brace and Company, inc, 1934.
- "Anticlericalism: Conflict Between Church and State in France, Italy, and Spain", publisher: D. Van Nostrand Company, Inc., Princeton, NJ, 1967.
