= Gustave de Molinari =

Belgian political economist and classical liberal theorist (1819–1912)

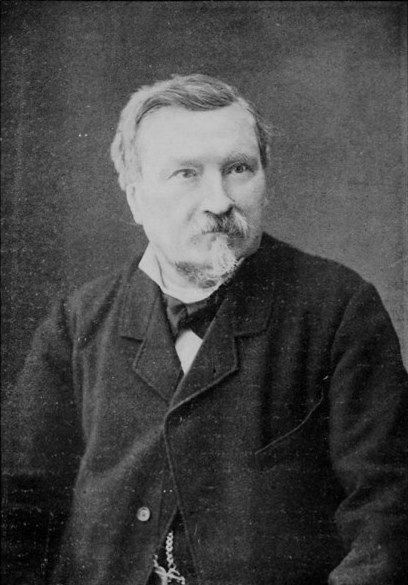
- Gustave de Molinari, c. 1849 or 1860s
- Born: 3 March 1819; Liège, United Kingdom of the Netherlands
- Died: 28 January 1912 (aged 92); Adinkerke, Belgium

Academic background
- Influences: Frédéric Bastiat · Hippolyte Castille

Academic work
- School or tradition: French Liberal School
- Notable ideas: Private defence agency

Gustave de Molinari (French: [də mɔlinari]; 3 March 1819 – 28 January 1912) was a Belgian political economist and French Liberal School theorist associated with French laissez-faire economists such as Frédéric Bastiat and Hippolyte Castille.

== Biography ==
Born in Liège, Wallonia, Molinari's critique of the state sometimes resulted in his opposing causes and events which might seemingly be aligned with his overall critique of power and privilege. An example of this was the American Civil War, which Molinari believed to be far more about the trade interests of Northern industrialists than about slavery, although he did not deny that abolitionism was a part of the picture. According to Ralph Raico, Molinari never relented in his last work, published a year before his death in 1912, writing:

The American Civil War had not been simply a humanitarian crusade to free the slaves. The war "ruined the conquered provinces," but the Northern plutocrats pulling the strings achieved their aim: the imposition of a vicious protectionism that led ultimately "to the regime of trusts and produced the billionaires."

Molinari supported his liberal views by citing evolutionary concepts, claiming that the "economic state" (an international commercial system) would have a complete laissez-faire. He argued this was the ultimate stage of social evolution, caused by a struggle for existence between competing commercial actors. War has been the driver of early social systems, he felt, which encouraged invention as a result. After the industry developed, however, wars grew detrimental rather than beneficial, replaced by economic competition. Molinari felt this would be better, since it applied to all classes in society. As the less fit were eliminated by competition, the entire society would be raised over time. He argued that competition like this would never end, but would continue forever. Molinari opposed both monarchy and socialism as a result of being detrimental to this process. Acknowledging that great poverty had risen in tandem with wealth, he argued it would be eliminated through moral evolution occurring alongside economic progress, which was necessary for it.

== Influence ==
Some anarcho-capitalists consider Molinari to be the first proponent of anarcho-capitalism. In the preface to the 1977 English translation by Murray Rothbard called The Production of Security the "first presentation anywhere in human history of what is now called anarcho-capitalism", although admitting that "Molinari did not use the terminology, and probably would have balked at the name". Austrian School economist Hans-Hermann Hoppe said that "the 1849 article 'The Production of Security' is probably the single most important contribution to the modern theory of anarcho-capitalism". In the past, Molinari influenced some of the political thoughts of individualist anarchist Benjamin Tucker and the Liberty circle. The Molinari Institute, directed by philosopher Roderick T. Long, is named after him, whom it terms the "originator of the theory of Market Anarchism".
