= Hippolyte Castille =

French writer (1820–1886)

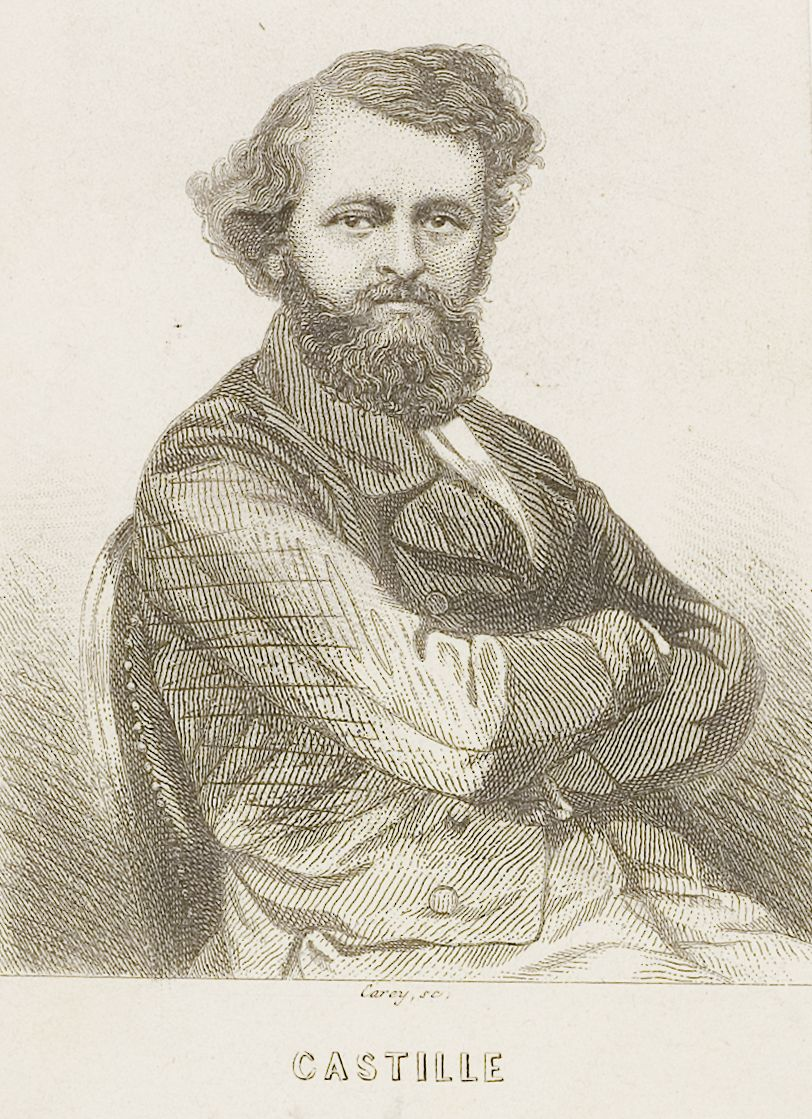
Hippolyte Castille

Hippolyte Castille (8 November 1820, Montreuil-sur-Mer – 26 September 1886, Luc-sur-Mer) was a French writer and polemicist.

Castille wrote in collaboration with Frédéric Bastiat and Gustave de Molinari. Among his works are the Portraits historiques du dix-neuvième siècle, with portraits of the likes of Chateaubriand, Baroche and Lamartine, among many others. He also wrote about Napoleon III.

== Publications ==
- Le Dernier Banquet de la bourgeoisie, 1849
- La Place publique, 1849
- Les Ambitieux, 1851
- Les Oiseaux de proie, 1851
- L'Ascalante, 1852
- Les Hommes et les Mœurs en France sous le règne de Louis-Philippe, 1853
- La Chasse aux chimères. Le Dernier des Starle, 1854
- Histoire de la seconde République française, 4 vol., 1854–1856
- Histoires de ménage, scènes de la vie réelle, 1856
- Portraits politiques au dix-neuvième siècle, 80 fasc., 1857–1862
- Première série:

1. Napoléon III. 2. Alexandre II. 3. Le Général Cavaignac. 4. La Duchesse d'Orléans. 5. Le Marquis Delcanetto. 6. Drouyn de Lhuys. 7. Ledru-Rollin. 8. Lord Palmerston. 9. Le Comte de Montalembert. 10. Louis Blanc. 11. Louis Blanc. 12. Saint-Arnauld et Canrobert. 13. Michelet. 14. Espartero et O'Donnel. 15. Victor Hugo. 16. Le prince de Talleyrand. 17. L.-A. Blanqui. 18. Le Prince de Metternich. 19. Louis Philippe. 20. Le Comte de Persigny. 20 bis. Frédéric Guillaume IV. 21. Lamennais. 22. Le Comte de Chambord. 23. M. Guizot. 24. Mme de Stael. 25. Le Général Changarnier. 26. Benjamin Constant. 27. Le Prince Alexandre Ghika IX, caïmacan de Valachie, et Nicolas Conaki Vogoridès, caïmacan de Moldavie. 28. Chateaubriand. 29. Béranger. 30. M. Thiers. 31. Armand Carrel. – 1857. 32. M. de Lamartine. 33. Réchid-Pacha. 34. Paul-Louis Courier. 35. La Duchesse de Berry. 37. Napoléon Ier. 38. Le Général de Lamoricière. 39. Jules Favre. 40. Pie IX. 41. E. de Girardin. 42. P.-J. Proudhon. 43. Lafayette. 44. Victoria. 45. Edgard Quinet. 46. Casimir Perier. 47. Oscar Ier, roi de Suède. 48. Les Journaux et les journalistes sous l'Empire et sous la Restauration. 49. Les Journaux et les journalistes sous le règne de Louis Philippe. 50. Les Journaux et les journalistes depuis 1848 jusqu'à aujourd'hui.

- Deuxième série:

1. Le Maréchal Pélissier, duc de Malakoff. 2. Le Père Enfantin. 3. Le Prince Napoléon-Bonaparte. 4. Les Princes de la famille d'Orléans, le prince de Joinville et le duc d'Aumale. 5. M. Berryer. 6. M. de Morny. 7. M. Villemain. 8. Le Maréchal Bosquet. 9. Ferdinand II, roi de Naples. 10. Le Comte de Cavour. 11. Les chefs de corps de l'armée d'Italie. 12. Garibaldi. 13. Louis Kossuth. 14. Victor Emmanuel II. 15. L'Impératrice Eugénie. 16. Jérôme Bonaparte. 17. M. Baroche. 18. M. Mocquard. 19. Mazzini. 20. François-Joseph, empereur d'Autriche. 21. Léopold, roi des Belges. 22. Mgr Dupanloup, évêque d'Orléans. 23. Le Vicomte de la Guéronnière. 24. M. Achille Fould. 25. M. Rouland. 26. Le Cardinal Antonelli. 27. Le Général de Pimodan. 28. Les Frères Pereire. 29. Le Père Félix. 30. M. Ratazzi.

- Parallèle entre César, Charlemagne et Napoléon : L'Empire et la démocratie, philosophie de la légende impériale, 1858
- Aventures imaginaires, 1858
- Blanche d'Orbe, précédé d'un essai sur Clarisse Harlowe et La Nouvelle Héloïse, 2 vol., 1859
- L'Excommunication, 1860
- Le Pape et l'Encyclique, 1860
- Napoléon III et le clergé, 1860
- La Quatrième Dynastie, 1861
- Histoire de la Révolution française, 4 vol., 1863
- 1. États Généraux. 2. Constituante. 3. Convention. 4. Directoire 1788–1800.
- Les Massacres de juin 1848, 1869
- Lettres de Paris, 2 vol., 1873
- Les Compagnons de la mort. Espérance, s. d.
- Le Contrebandier, s. d.
- Le Markgrave. Le Secret d'une jeune fille, s. d.
