= French liberal school =

19th-century laissez-faire advocates

The French liberal school, also called the optimist school or the orthodox school, is a 19th-century school of economic thought that was centered on the Collège de France and the Institut de France. The Journal des Économistes was instrumental in promulgating the ideas of the school. Key thinkers include Frédéric Bastiat, Jean-Baptiste Say, Antoine Destutt de Tracy, Julien Freund, Pierre Manent and Gustave de Molinari.

The school vigorously defended free trade and laissez-faire. They were primary opponents of interventionist and protectionist ideas. This made the French school a forerunner of the modern Austrian school.

== See also ==
- Austrian School
- Parable of the broken window
- Physiocrats
