= Proudhon and His Children =

Painting by Gustave Courbet

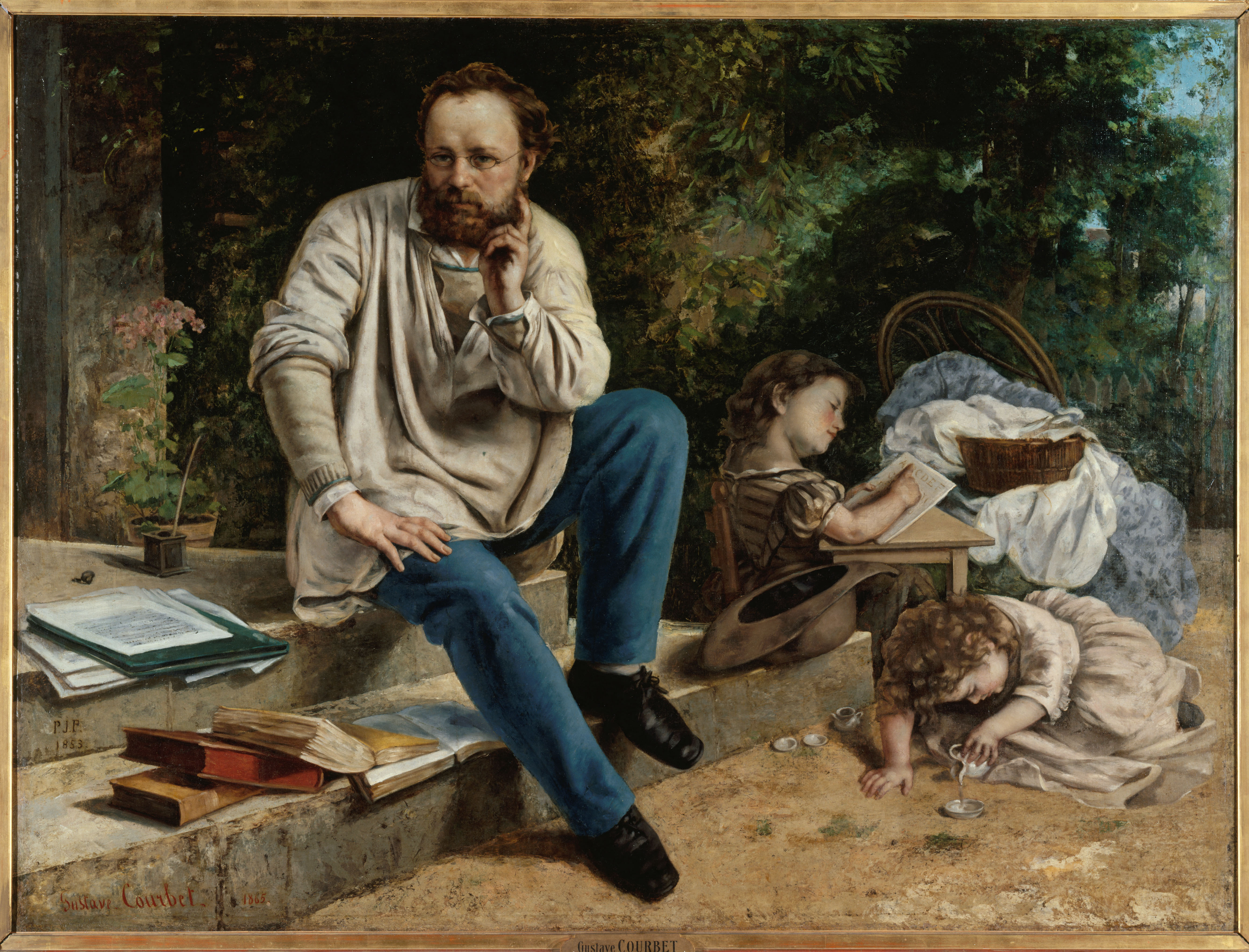
- Artist: Gustave Courbet
- Year: 1865
- Medium: oil on canvas
- Dimensions: 147 cm × 198 cm (58 in × 78 in)
- Location: Petit Palais, Paris

Proudhon and His Children is an oil-on-canvas group portrait by the French painter Gustave Courbet, created in 1865, now held in the Petit Palais in Paris. The main figure is a posthumously produced image of French philosopher Pierre-Joseph Proudhon, who appears with his two children reading and playing.

== History ==
Two other titles were given by Courbet to this painting, namely Proudhon and His Family and Pierre Joseph Proudhon and his children in 1853. A letter from the painter to Jules-Antoine Castagnary, from July 14, 1867, suggests that Euphrasia, the philosopher's wife, appeared instead of the basket and the wicker armchair covered with fabrics. The canvas was therefore repainted, shortly before the artist's major personal exhibition in 1867. The painting seems a priori to be a posthumous tribute to Pierre-Joseph Proudhon, who died on January 20, 1865, but in reality, the painter, knowing that his friend was sick, had the idea, shortly before his death, to execute a series of portraits depicting him. He also created two bust portraits, one showing Proudhon, and the other his wife.

Seized with other paintings by Courbet at Durand-Ruel in June 1873, it was sold on November 26, 1877, to Jean-Hubert Debrousse, who acquired it for 1,500 francs, when the asking price was 5,000 francs. After Debrousse's death, his collection was auctioned at April 1900. The painting was then bought for 6,150 francs by the city of Paris, and is now exhibited at the Petit Palais.

== Description ==
The philosopher, dressed in a blouse and trousers in toile de Nîmes, is shown seated, posing with his left hand on his face and the right hand on his leg, with his two daughters, one who reads, while the other engage in playful activity, to his left. Proudhon is seated on the steps in front of the entrance of the Parisian apartment where he lived at the intersection of the old Rue d'Hell and 146, Rue Notre-Dame-des-Champs. There are four books, a pencil case, and a manuscript, under which, traced in the stone of the last step, one can read "PJP 1853".

== Related Works ==
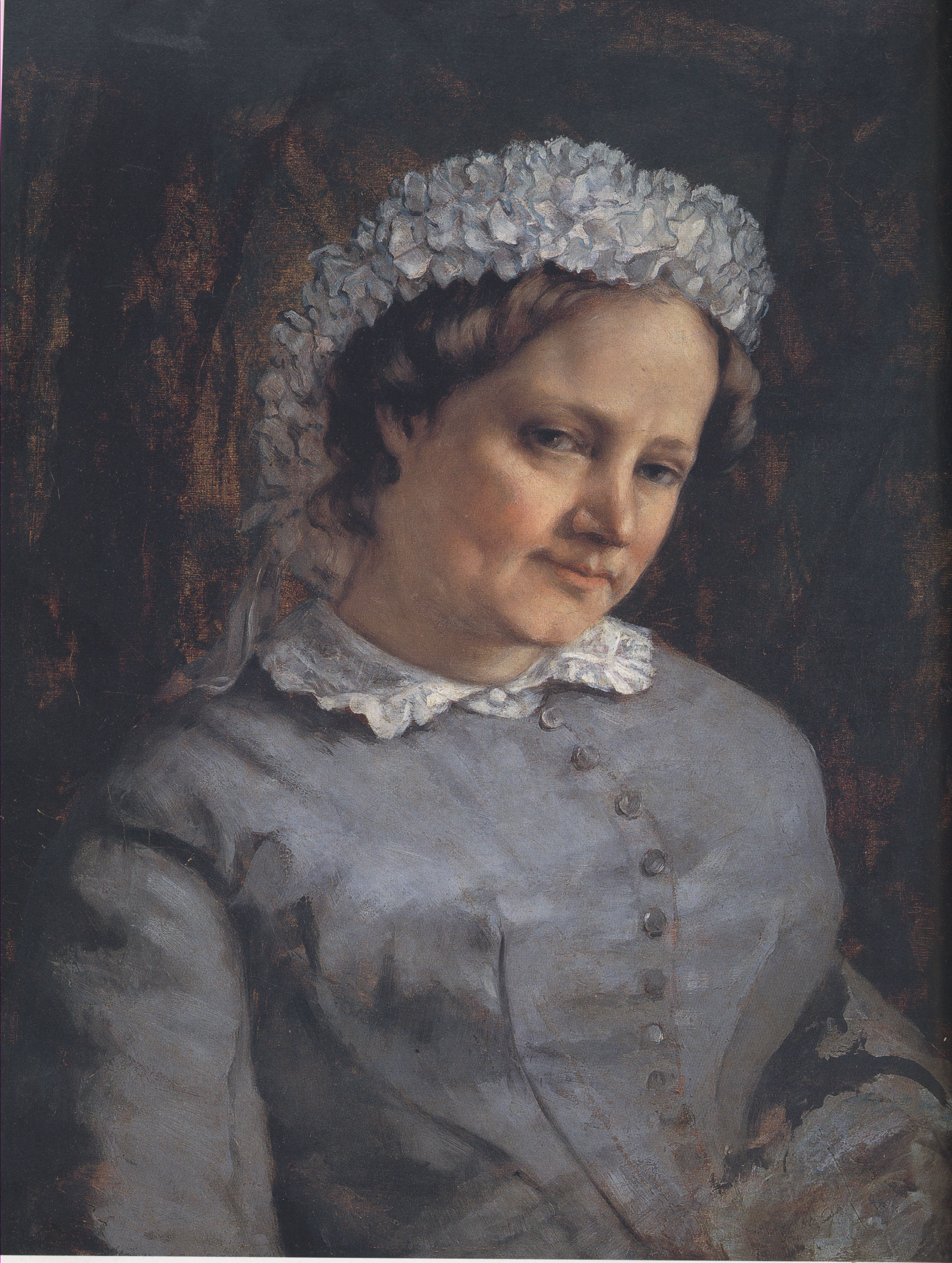
Portrait of Madame Proudhon, 1865, Musée d'Orsay

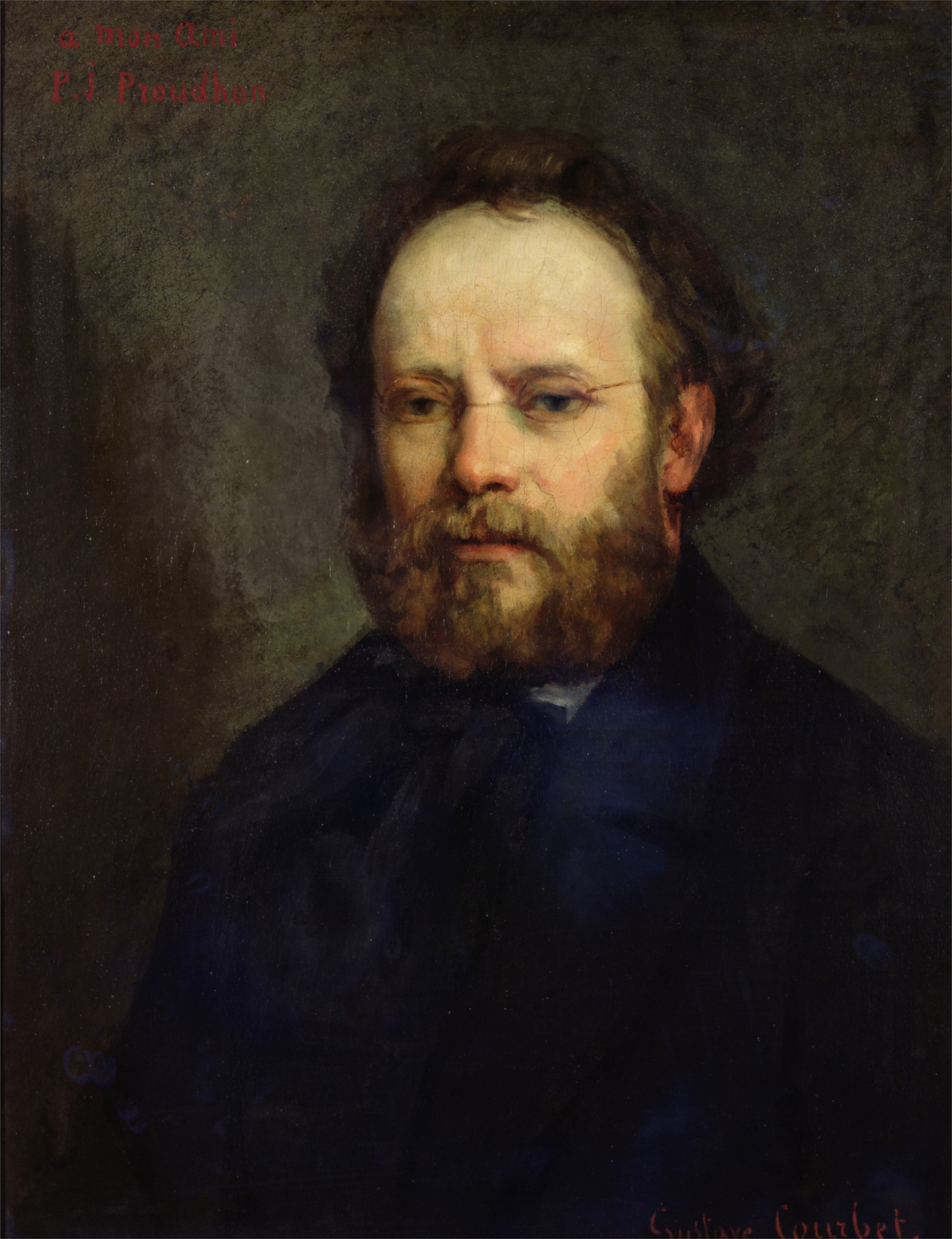
Pierre-Joseph Proudhon, 1865, Musée d'Orsay
