= Frédéric Bastiat =

French economist (1801–1850)

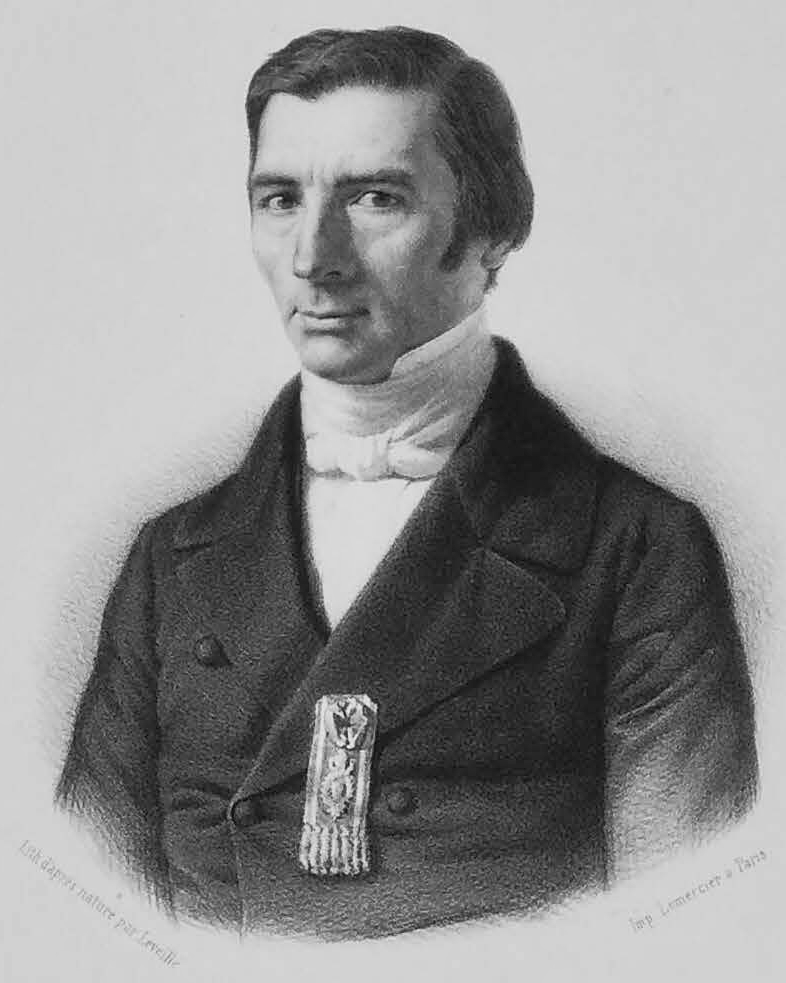

Member of the National Assembly for Landes
- In office 23 April 1848 – 24 December 1850

Personal details
- Born: Claude-Frédéric Bastiat; 30 June 1801 Bayonne, France
- Died: 24 December 1850 (aged 49) Rome, Papal States
- Resting place: San Luigi dei Francesi, Rome

Academic background
- Influences: Cobden, Machiavelli, Montaigne, Descartes, Moliere, Spinoza, Hobbes, Locke, Hume, Gibbon, Diderot, Montesquieu, Voltaire, Rousseau, Hugo, Jefferson, Paine, Franklin, Smith, Turgot

Academic work
- School or tradition: French liberal school
- Notable ideas: Legal plunder Parable of the broken window The Law

Claude-Frédéric Bastiat (/bɑːstiˈɑː/; French: [klod fʁedeʁik bastja]; 30 June 1801 – 24 December 1850) was a French economist, writer, and prominent member of the French liberal school.

A member of the French National Assembly, Bastiat developed the economic concept of opportunity cost and introduced the parable of the broken window. He was described as "the most brilliant economic journalist who ever lived" by economic theorist Joseph Schumpeter.

As an advocate of classical economics and the economics of Adam Smith, his views favored a free market and influenced the Austrian School. He is best known for his book The Law, where he argued that law must protect rights such as private property, not "plunder" others' property.

== Biography ==
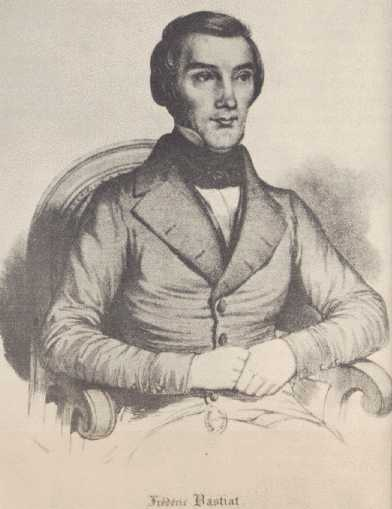
Drawing of Bastiat

Bastiat was born on 29 June 1801 in Bayonne, Gascony (Aquitaine), a port town in the south of France on the Bay of Biscay. His grandfather Pierre Bastiat (1742–1825) had come to trade in Bayonne from the inland town of Mugron in the wine-growing region of Chalosse and the Landes department, married Bastiat's grandmother Catherine Laulhé (also from the Chalosse) in 1770. Having armed a frigate at his own expense for the War of the Pyrenees in 1793 to improve his standing with the Republic, Pierre Bastiat acquired the estate of Sengresse (just north of Mugron), confiscated during the French Revolution from the house of Béthune-Chârost, at an auction on 9 June 1795, in the closing stages of the war, and made it his family's residence. The bourgeois prosperity launched by Bayonne's new status as a free port from 1784 was cut short by the dissolution of the town's chamber of commerce in 1791, the ensuing wars with Spain (1793–1795, 1807–1814), and the Continental Blockade (1806–1814); the Bastiat family then shifted its interests to privateering and trading with the American colonies. Bastiat's father, Pierre (1771–1810), the eldest of seven children and also a businessman, married Bastiat's mother Julie Fréchou (1773–1808) in 1800; they both died in the epidemics of tuberculosis that hit Bayonne during the Peninsular War. Frédéric, orphaned at the age of nine, was raised by his grandfather and unmarried aunt Justine Bastiat between Sengresse and Bayonne. He started his education with abbé Meilhan in Bayonne and attended the college in Saint-Sever, before in 1815 he was enrolled by his family at the Sorèze Abbey Benedictine boarding school near Castres (a royal military college, granted lycée status in 1813 and admitting Protestants), where he studied philosophy along with English, Spanish and Italian.

In 1818, Bastiat left the college and was sent by his grandfather to work as a junior clerk (commis) for his uncle, the lawyer Henry Monclar (1766–1831), in the Bayonne branch of the Monclar and Bastiat international trading firm, where his father had previously been a partner. Monclar, a theoretician of trade, acted as a mentor to young Bastiat. In a September 1819 letter to his friend Victor Calmètes, Bastiat acknowledged his disinterest in routine commercial affairs, his dedication to philosophy and politics, and his resolution to leave business soon, but also his realisation that "the good merchant … must study the laws and delve into political economy, which goes beyond the realm of routine and requires constant study". By early 1820, he had read Jean-Baptiste Say's Treatise on Political Economy; over the following five years, he continued to study the subject through the works of Say, Adam Smith, and Antoine Destutt de Tracy, and articles in Charles Comte and Charles Dunoyer's discontinued liberal journal Le Censeur européen.

In 1821, Bastiat was admitted to the Masonic lodge La Zélée, whose ranks included his grandfather (since 1790), his deceased father (from at least 1792), and his uncles. He became the keeper of the seals for La Zélée in 1822 and acted as its orator in 1823. Through a fellow member of the lodge, printer Bernard Lamaignère (1776–1842), Bastiat joined the circle of young liberal intelligentsia surrounding the influential banker Jacques Laffitte, who was a native of Bayonne and Lamaignère's in-law.

Although Bastiat's plans to pursue university studies in Paris were not realised for family reasons, the estate of Sengresse he inherited at his grandfather's death in 1825 provided him with a means to further his theoretical inquiries. He withdrew from maritime commerce to lead the life of a gentleman farmer and dedicated much intellectual effort to agronomy, with frequent study visits to the Agricultural Academy of Landes (Académie agricole des Landes) at the river port of Mont-de-Marsan. In 1827, he embarked on a study of the works of Charles Dunoyer and Benjamin Franklin, while declaring the "virtues" of the latter to be unreachable for himself. A neighbour of Bastiat's estate, Félix Coudroy, a lawyer by profession and a devotee of Joseph de Maistre and Félicité de La Mennais's ultramontanism, became the main confidant of his mature years and a key influence on his intellectual development during the 1830s (their correspondence dated back to at least 1824), later credited in the 1850 Harmonies of Political Economy and designated by Bastiat to complete his unfinished works.

After the middle-class July Revolution of 1830, Bastiat became politically active and circulated a pamphlet addressed to the Landes constituents on the occasion of the legislative election of that year, in which he criticised government taxation and appealed to the individual rationality of voters on behalf of the general interest. He was elected justice of the peace of Mugron in 1831 and to the Council General (county-level assembly) of Landes in 1832. He was elected to the national legislative assembly after the French Revolution of 1848.

Bastiat, who had credited England with "marching as always at the head of European civilization" in 1825, developed an enthusiasm for Richard Cobden's antiprotectionist Anti-Corn Law League by 1842, and welcomed the opening of the English Club of Pau in the same year. Having achieved national recognition as an economist with the publication of his article in defence of Cobden's Manchester Liberalism in the Journal des économistes in October 1844, Bastiat began a correspondence with Cobden that resulted in a political alliance against protectionism and socialism between them. Bastiat visited England in 1845 and 1848, and by 1846, moved to Paris, where he witnessed the June Days uprising of 1848. In early 1846, he set up an association in Bordeaux to launch the free trade movement in France.

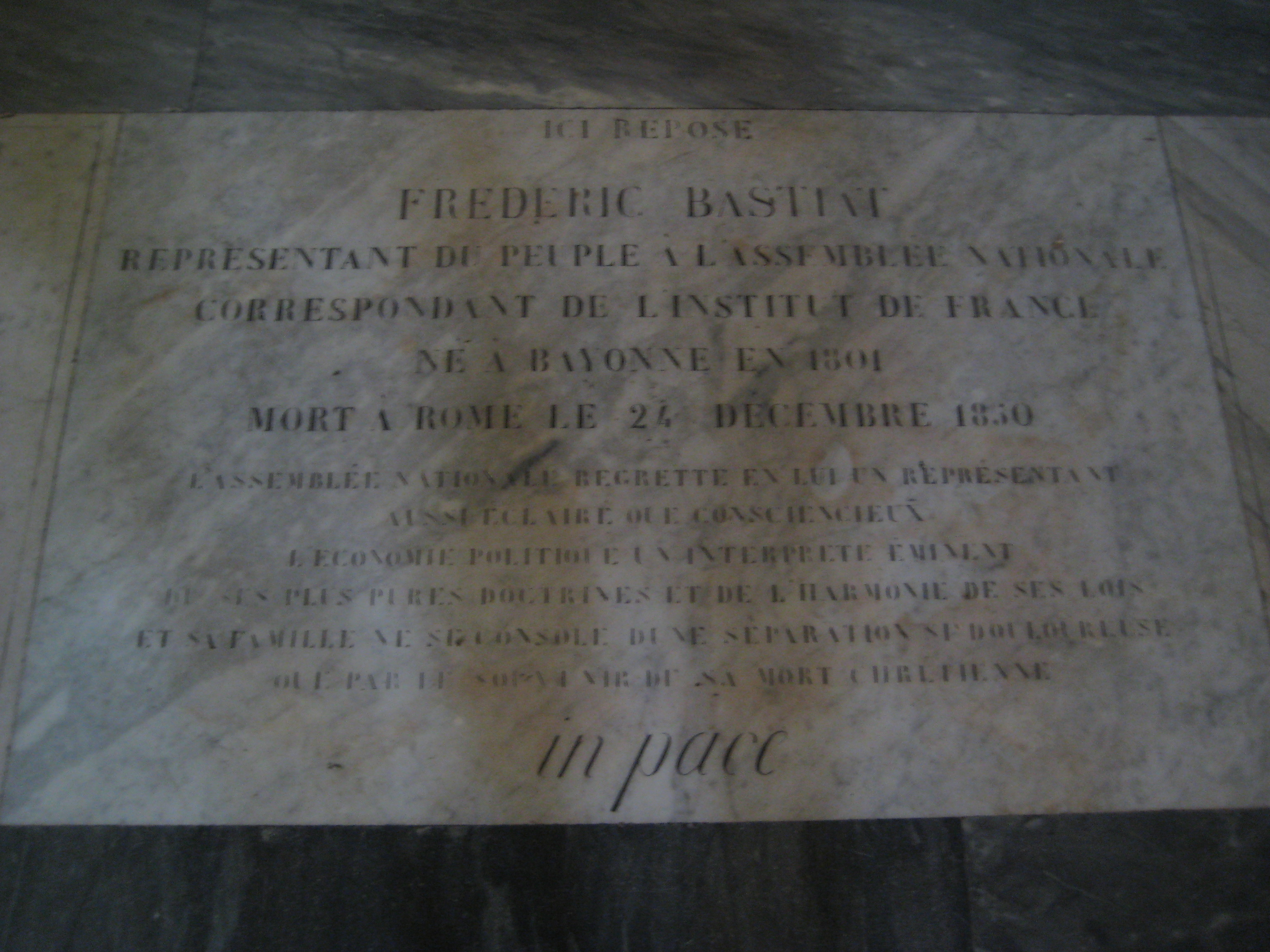
Bastiat's tomb in San Luigi dei Francesi, a Catholic church in Rome

Bastiat contracted tuberculosis, probably during his tours throughout France to promote his ideas, and the illness eventually prevented him from making further speeches (particularly at the legislative assembly to which he was elected in 1848 and 1849) and cut his life short. In The Law, he wrote: "Until the day of my death, I shall proclaim this principle with all the force of my lungs (which alas! is all too inadequate)".

During the autumn of 1850, he was sent to Italy by his doctors. He first traveled to Pisa in the Grand Duchy of Tuscany, then to Rome. Before dying on 24 December 1850, Bastiat is alleged to have called those with him to approach his bed and murmured "the truth, the truth". He is buried at the church of San Luigi dei Francesi in Rome.

== Works ==
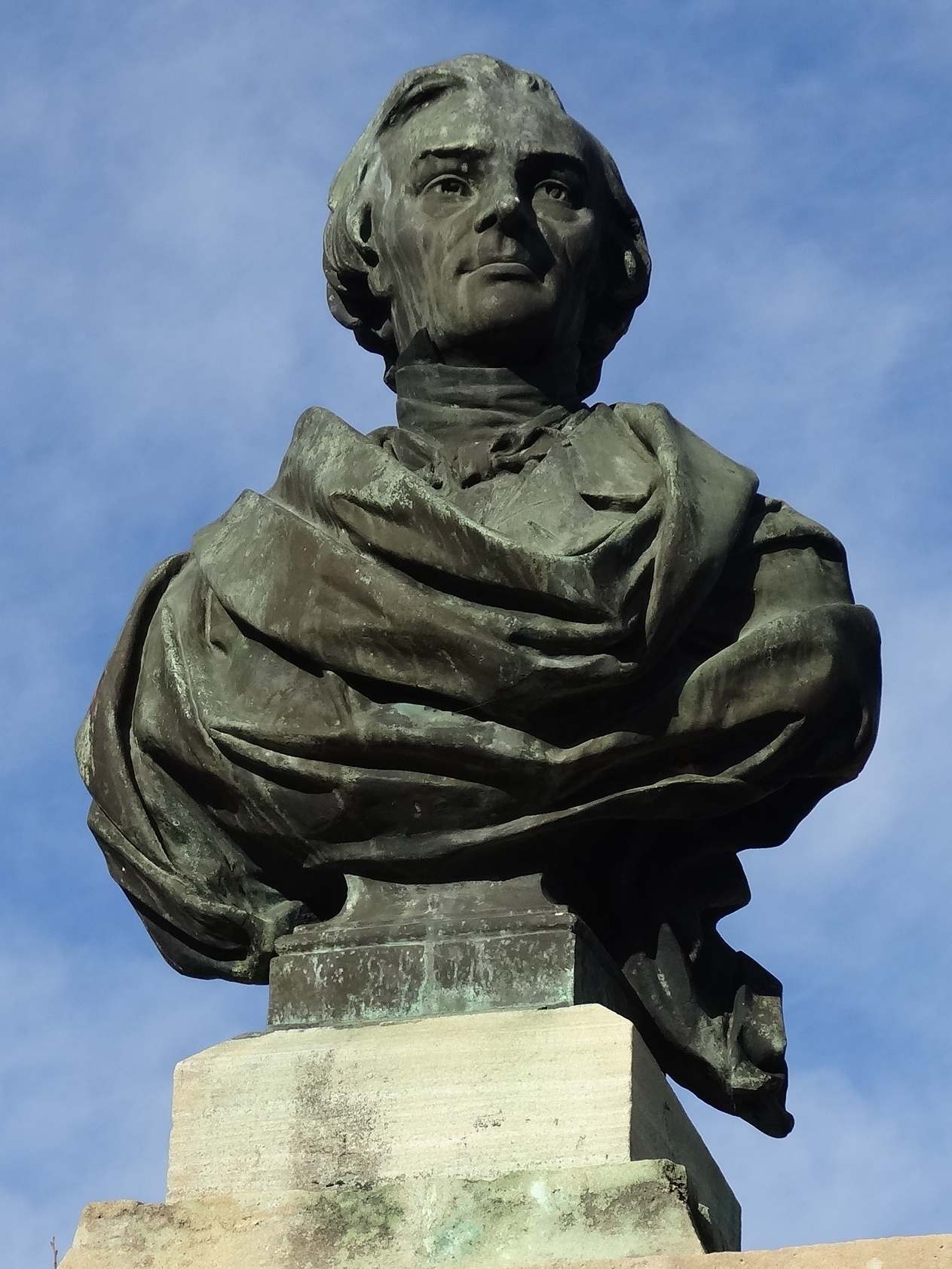
Bust of Bastiat in Mugron

Bastiat was the author of many works on economics and political economy, generally characterized by their clear organization, forceful argumentation, and acerbic wit. Economist Murray Rothbard wrote, "Bastiat was indeed a lucid and superb writer, whose brilliant and witty essays and fables to this day are remarkable and devastating demolitions of protectionism and of all forms of government subsidy and control. He was a truly scintillating advocate of an unrestricted free market". However, Bastiat himself declared that subsidy should be available, albeit limited under extraordinary circumstances, saying:

"Under extraordinary circumstances, for urgent cases, the State should set aside some resources to assist certain unfortunate people, to help them adjust to changing conditions".

His first published works were two short treatises on the winemaking industry of the Landes, Le fisc et la vigne (1841) and Mémoire sur la question vinicole (1843), in which he blamed excessive taxation for the regional industry's crisis.

Among his better-known works is Economic Sophisms, a series of essays (originally published in the Journal des économistes), which contain a defence of free trade. Bastiat wrote the work while living in England to advise the shapers of the French Republic on perils to avoid. Economic Sophisms was translated and adapted for an American readership in 1867 by economist and historian of money Alexander del Mar, writing under the pseudonym Emile Walter.

=== Economic Sophisms and the candlemakers' petition ===
The work, addressed to "the Good People" as an argument for free trade, has been characterised as an "equivalent of Economics 101 for freshmen". Contained within Economic Sophisms is the satirical parable known as the candlemakers' petition in which candlemakers and tallow producers lobby the Chamber of Deputies of the French July Monarchy (1830–1848) to block out the Sun to prevent its unfair competition with their products. Also included in the Sophisms is a facetious petition to the king asking for a law forbidding the usage of everyone's right hand, based on a presumption by some of his contemporaries that more difficulty means more work and more work means more wealth.

=== The Law (1850) ===
Bastiat's most famous work is his book The Law (La Loi), originally published as a pamphlet in 1850. It defines a just system of laws and then demonstrates how such law facilitates a free society. In The Law, Bastiat wrote that everyone has a right to protect "his person, his liberty, and his property". The state should be only a "substitution of a common force for individual forces" to defend this right. According to Bastiat, justice (meaning defense of one's life, liberty, and property) has precise limits, but if government power extends further into philanthropic endeavors, then government becomes so limitless that it can grow endlessly. The resulting statism is "based on this triple hypothesis: the total inertness of mankind, the omnipotence of the law, and the infallibility of the legislator". The public then becomes socially engineered by the legislator and must bend to the legislators' will "like the clay to the potter", saying:

Socialism, like the ancient ideas from which it springs, confuses the distinction between government and society. As a result of this, every time we object to a thing being done by government, the socialists conclude that we object to its being done at all. We disapprove of state education. Then, the socialists say that we are opposed to any education. We object to a state religion. Then, the socialists say that we want no religion at all. We object to a state-enforced equality. Then, they say that we are against equality. And so on, and so on. It is as if the socialists were to accuse us of not wanting persons to eat because we do not want the state to raise grain. I do not dispute their right to invent social combinations, to advertise them, to advocate them, and to try them upon themselves, at their own expense and risk. But I do dispute their right to impose these plans upon us by law – by force – and to compel us to pay for them with our taxes.

Bastiat posits that the law becomes perverted when it punishes one's right to self-defense (of his life, liberty, and property) in favor of another's right to legalized plunder, which he defines as "if the law takes from some persons what belongs to them and gives it to other persons to whom it does not belong. See if the law benefits one citizen at the expense of another by doing what the citizen himself cannot do without committing a crime" in which he includes the tax support of "protective tariffs, subsidies, guaranteed profits, guaranteed jobs, relief and welfare schemes, public education, progressive taxation, free credit, and public works". According to Bastiat, legal plunder can be committed in "an infinite number of ways. Thus, we have an infinite number of plans for organizing it: tariffs, protection, benefits, subsidies, encouragements, progressive taxation, public schools, guaranteed jobs, guaranteed profits, minimum wages, a right to relief, a right to the tools of labor, free credit, and so on, and so on. All these plans as a whole — with their common aim of legal plunder — constitute socialism". Bastiat also made the following humorous point: "If the natural tendencies of mankind are so bad that it is not safe to permit people to be free, how is it that the tendencies of these organizers are always good? Do not the legislators and their appointed agents also belong to the human race? Or do they believe that they themselves are made of a finer clay than the rest of mankind?"

=== "What is Seen and What is not Seen" ===
In his 1850 essay "Ce qu'on voit et ce qu'on ne voit pas" ("What is seen and what is not seen"), Bastiat introduced through the parable of the broken window the concept of opportunity cost in all but name. This term was not coined until over 60 years after his death by Friedrich von Wieser in 1914.

=== Debate with Pierre-Joseph Proudhon ===
Bastiat famously engaged in a debate between 1849 and 1850 with Pierre-Joseph Proudhon about the legitimacy of interest. As Robert Leroux argued, Bastiat had the conviction that Proudhon's anti-interest doctrine "was the complete antithesis of any serious approach". Proudhon famously lost his temper and resorted to personal attacks: "Your intelligence is asleep, or rather it has never been awake. You are a man for whom logic does not exist. You do not hear anything, you do not understand anything. You are without philosophy, without science, without humanity. Your ability to reason, like your ability to pay attention and make comparisons, is zero. Scientifically, Mr. Bastiat, you are a dead man."

== Views ==
Bastiat's support for free trade and denunciation of protectionism, which he associated with the Continental Blockade, was shaped by the vicissitudes of his family's international trading firm, in which he took an active role from 1818 to 1825. His participation in the intellectual networks of Freemasonry and in Jacques Laffitte's circle from 1821 introduced him to liberalism as a set of ideas. In 1845, he acknowledged a profound influence of the writings of Charles Dunoyer on his own thought in a letter to their author.

Bastiat asserted that the sole purpose of government is to protect the right of an individual to life, liberty, and property and that government interference with an individual's other personal matters is dangerous and morally wrong. From this, Bastiat concluded that the law cannot defend life, liberty, and property if it promotes legal or legalized plunder, which he defined as using government force and laws to take something from one individual and give it to others (as opposed to a transfer of property via mutually agreed contracts without using fraud or violent threats against the other party, which Bastiat considered a legitimate transfer of property).

In The Law, Bastiat explains that if the privileged classes or socialists use the government for legalized plunder, this will encourage the other socioeconomic class to also use legal plunder and that the correct response to the socialists is to cease all legal plunder. Bastiat also explains why his opinion is that the law cannot defend life, liberty, and property if it promotes socialist policies. When used to obtain legalized plunder for any group, he says that the law is perverted against the only things (life, liberty, and property) it is supposed to defend.

Bastiat was a strong supporter of free trade who was inspired by and routinely corresponded with Richard Cobden and the English Anti-Corn Law League and worked with free-trade associations in France. He backed the July Revolution of 1830, describing the middle-class revolutionaries as "enlightened, wealthy, and prudent men who are sacrificing their interests and their lives to achieve order and its inseparable companion, liberty", but opposed the revolutions of 1848 as antiliberal and elevating the role of the state.

Because of his emphasis on the mutual gains to be had from free exchange, on subjective value, and on the importance of deductive reasoning (as opposed to mathematical models) in deriving economic conclusions, Bastiat has been described by Mark Thornton, Thomas DiLorenzo, and other economists as a forerunner of the Austrian School, with Thornton positing that through taking this position on the motivations of human action he demonstrates a pronounced "Austrian flavor".

Bastiat reiterated his commitment to Christianity in his letters to Victor Calmètes of 1820–1821, where he described religion as a comforting source of morality beyond all error, and in his 1850 Harmonies of Political Economy, which he wrote was "pervaded" by his belief in God. His notion of a natural harmony between "true" socio-economic interests of individuals received praise from Cardinal Gioacchino Pecci in 1877, a year before Pecci's election to papacy as Leo XIII. He was also cited as a key influence by the US president Ronald Reagan on the latter's accession in 1981.

== Books ==
- — (1848). Propriété et loi. Justice et fraternité. Paris: Guillaumin et C^{ie}.
- — (1849). L'État. Maudit argent. Paris: Guillaumin et C^{ie}.
- — (1849). Incomptabilités parlementaires. Paris: Guillaumin et C^{ie}.
- — (1849). Paix et liberté ou le budget républicain. Paris: Guillaumin et C^{ie}.
- — (1849). Protectionisme et communisme. Paris: Guillaumin et C^{ie}.
- — (1983). Oeuvres économiques. Libre échange. Textes présentés par Florin Aftalion. Paris: PUF. ISBN 978-2130378617.
- — (2005). Sophismes économiques. Bibliothèque classique de la liberté (in French). Préface de Michel Leter. Paris: Les Belles Lettres. ISBN 978-2251390383.
- — (2009). Pamphlets. Bibliothèque classique de la liberté (in French). Préface de Michel Leter. Paris: Les Belles Lettres. ISBN 978-2251390499.

== See also ==
- Age of Enlightenment
- Anne Robert Jacques Turgot, Baron de Laune
- Bastiat Prize
- Harmonies of Political Economy
- Hippolyte Castille
- List of liberal theorists
- Physiocrats
