= Mugron =

- Commune
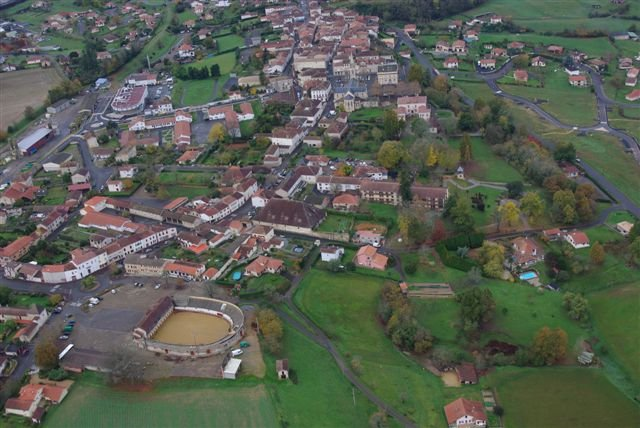

- Coat of arms
- Location of Mugron
- Location within France Location within Nouvelle-Aquitaine
- Coordinates: 43°45′03″N 0°44′53″W
- Country: France
- Region: Nouvelle-Aquitaine
- Department: Landes
- Arrondissement: Dax
- Canton: Coteau de Chalosse
- Intercommunality: Terres de Chalosse

Government
  - Mayor (2020–2026): Marie-Christine Brettes
- Area^{1}: 16.53 km^{2} (6.38 sq mi)
- Highest elevation: 111 m (364 ft)
- Lowest elevation: 14 m (46 ft)
- Population (2023): 1,348
  - Density: 81.55/km^{2} (211.2/sq mi)
- Time zone: UTC+01:00 (CET)
  - Summer (DST): UTC+02:00 (CEST)
- INSEE/Postal code: 40201 /40250
- ^{1} French Land Register data, which excludes lakes, ponds, glaciers > 1 km^{2} (0.386 sq mi or 247 acres) and river estuaries.

Mugron (French pronunciation: [myɡʁɔ̃]) is a commune in the Landes department in Nouvelle-Aquitaine in southwestern France.

== Population ==
Historical population
Year	Pop.	±% p.a.
1968	1,568	—
1975	1,470	−0.92%
1982	1,464	−0.06%
1990	1,327	−1.22%
1999	1,324	−0.03%
2007	1,390	+0.61%
2012	1,418	+0.40%
2017	1,382	−0.51%
2023	1,348	−0.41%
Source: INSEE

== Personalities ==
- Frédéric Bastiat lived most of his life at Mugron.

== See also ==
- Communes of the Landes department
