= Parable of the broken window =

Parable by French economist Frédéric Bastiat

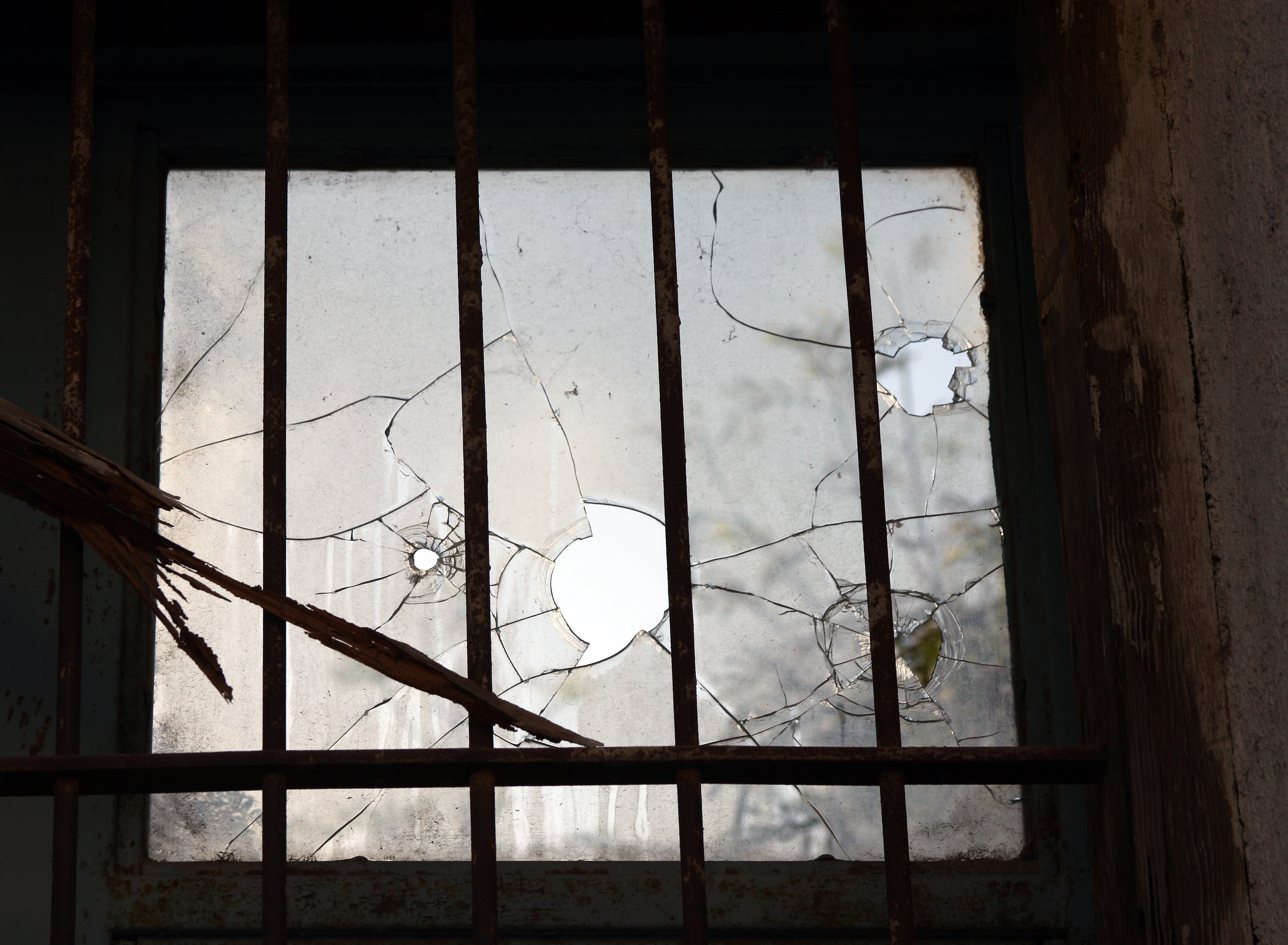
When a child accidentally smashes a window, and then it has to be replaced, does this accident constitute a benefit to society, due to the economic activity of repairing and replacing the window?

The parable of the broken window was introduced by French economist Frédéric Bastiat in his 1850 essay "That Which Is Seen, and That Which Is Not Seen" ("Ce qu'on voit et ce qu'on ne voit pas") to illustrate why destruction, and the money spent to recover from destruction, is not actually a net benefit to society.

The parable seeks to show how opportunity costs, as well as the law of unintended consequences, affect economic activity in ways that are unseen or ignored. The belief that destruction is good for the economy is consequently known as the broken window fallacy or glazier's fallacy.

== Parable ==
Bastiat's original parable of the broken window from "Ce qu'on voit et ce qu'on ne voit pas" (1850):

Have you ever witnessed the anger of the good shopkeeper, James Goodfellow, when his careless son has happened to break a pane of glass? If you have been present at such a scene, you will most assuredly bear witness to the fact that every one of the spectators, were there even thirty of them, by common consent apparently, offered the unfortunate owner this invariable consolation – "It is an ill wind that blows nobody good. Everybody must live, and what would become of the glaziers if panes of glass were never broken?"

Now, this form of condolence contains an entire theory, which it will be well to show up in this simple case, seeing that it is precisely the same as that which, unhappily, regulates the greater part of our economical institutions.

Suppose it cost six francs to repair the damage, and you say that the accident brings six francs to the glazier's trade – that it encourages that trade to the amount of six francs – I grant it; I have not a word to say against it; you reason justly. The glazier comes, performs his task, receives his six francs, rubs his hands, and, in his heart, blesses the careless child. All this is that which is seen.

But if, on the other hand, you come to the conclusion, as is too often the case, that it is a good thing to break windows, that it causes money to circulate, and that the encouragement of industry in general will be the result of it, you will oblige me to call out, "Stop there! Your theory is confined to that which is seen; it takes no account of that which is not seen."

It is not seen that as our shopkeeper has spent six francs upon one thing, he cannot spend them upon another. It is not seen that if he had not had a window to replace, he would, perhaps, have replaced his old shoes, or added another book to his library. In short, he would have employed his six francs in some way, which this accident has prevented.

== Interpretations and evidence ==
=== Bastiat's argument ===
Suppose it were discovered that the little boy was actually hired by the glazier and was paid a franc for every window he broke. Suddenly the same act would be regarded as theft: the glazier was breaking windows to force people to hire his services. Yet the facts observed by the onlookers remain true: the glazier benefits from the business at the expense of the baker, the tailor, and so on.

Bastiat argues that society endorses activities that are morally equivalent to the glazier hiring a boy to break windows for him:

Whence we arrive at this unexpected conclusion: "Society loses the value of things which are uselessly destroyed;" and we must assent to a maxim which will make the hair of protectionists stand on end – To break, to spoil, to waste, is not to encourage national labour; or, more briefly, "destruction is not profit."

What will you say, Moniteur Industriel – what will you say, disciples of good M. F. Chamans, who has calculated with so much precision how much trade would gain by the burning of Paris, from the number of houses it would be necessary to rebuild?

Bastiat is not addressing production – he is addressing the stock of wealth. In other words, Bastiat does not merely look at the immediate but at the longer effects of breaking the window. Bastiat takes into account the consequences of breaking the window for society as a whole, rather than for just one group.

Austrian theorists have cited this as a fallacy, saying it is a common element of popular thinking. The 20th century American economist Henry Hazlitt († 1993) devoted a chapter to the fallacy in his book Economics in One Lesson.

On 6 May 2025, the Independent Institute started a series on "teaching economics through today's ongoing trade war". They quote Bastiat's parable and summarize: "The moral of the story is simple: destruction doesn't create wealth. Destruction only destroys wealth."

=== Cost of disasters ===
The broken-window scenario is used as an analogy for destruction by natural disasters. Disasters disrupt economic activity. The economic effects of natural disasters are varied.

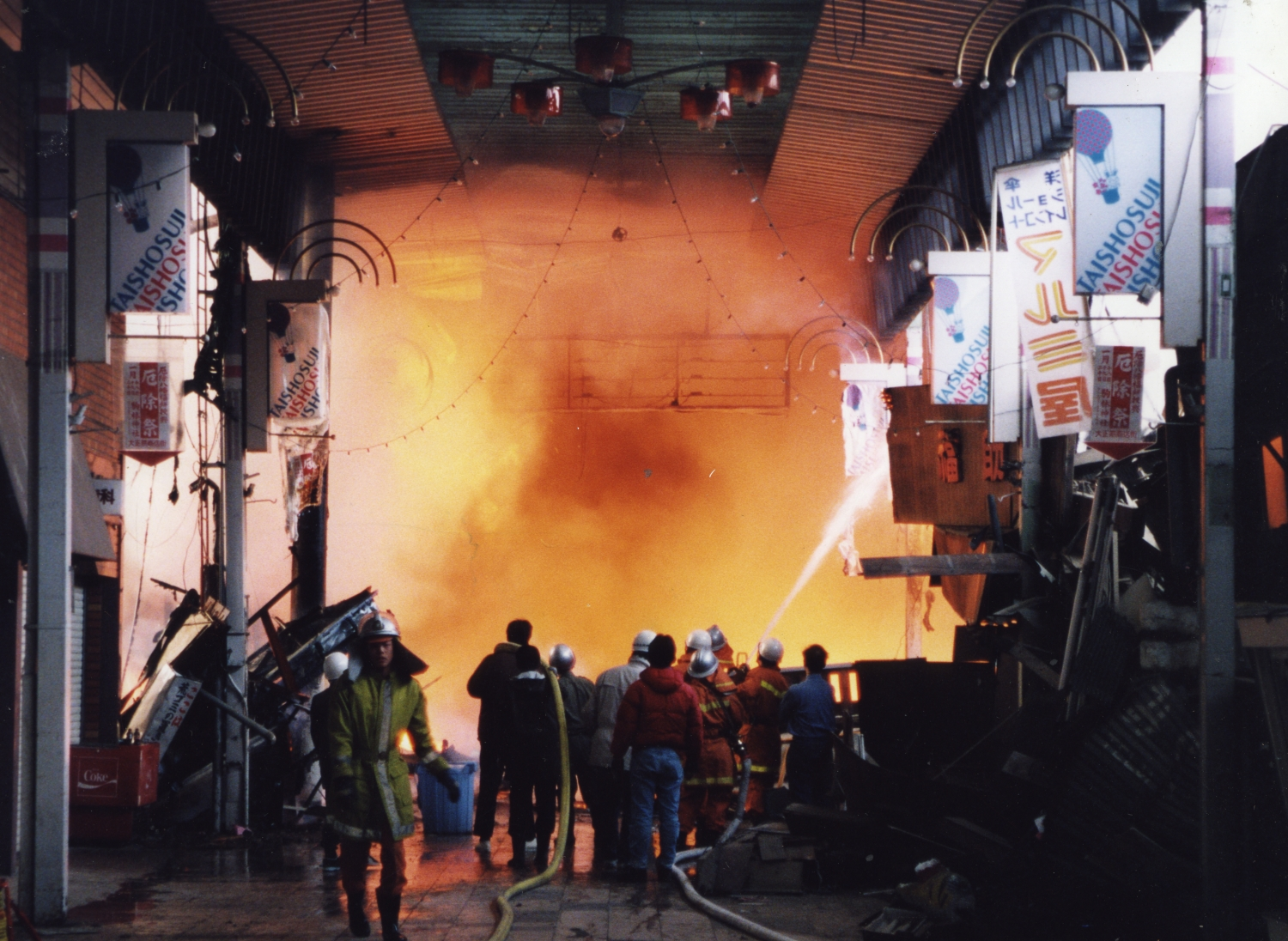
Firefighters at work in the Taisho-suji Market in Kobe, Japan after a 1995 earthquake.

Countries are more likely to have GDP fall after a disaster if they have more unemployment, more poverty, less effective local and national governments and institutions, and weaker economic and diplomatic connections. Countries are more likely to have a GDP boost and recover quickly from a disaster if they retain a skilled workforce and the ability to mobilize resources for reconstruction, including resources from outside the disaster area. On the one hand, prompt recovery has been attributed to prompt insurance and aid payments, with the contrast between Hurricane Andrew and Hurricane Katrina as an anecdotal example. On the other hand, slow recovery has been blamed on predatory behaviour, with those unharmed or less-harmed by the disaster taking advantage of those more harmed.

Areas that have had repeated disasters tend to invest more in skills and education (possibly because this is preferred to riskier investment in infrastructure, which might be destroyed again), and they tend to have a higher total factor productivity (possibly also because infrastructure destroyed in disasters is replaced with better infrastructure, as, for instance, in the Great Fire of London). These tendencies could in theory lead to longer-term economic benefits (which may cause GDP growth).

There is some evidence that geological disasters do more economic harm than climate-related disasters, in the long term. Geological disasters, such as landslides and earthquakes, happen with little immediate warning and kill many people. Climate-related disasters, such as hurricanes, are more predictable on a scale of days to hours, and kill fewer people. Such warning saves people, but not immovable property. This suggests that killing people does long-lasting economic harm, while destroying capital is not as harmful to GDP growth.

"Destroy any amount of physical capital, but leave behind a critical number of knowledgeable human beings whose brains still house the culture and technology of a dynamic economy, and the physical capital will tend to reemerge almost spontaneously" — George Horwich, Purdue University

Even in disasters with few physical injuries, a large portion of the economic cost may be public health effects (approximately a tenth, in the case of the summer 2007 floods in the UK). The economic costs of disruption to children's education are significant. Mental health issues may be triggered or exacerbated by the distress suffered during the disaster. Health advice on minimizing psychosocial distress has been given for disasters. While public health costs may contribute to economic activity and GDP growth, growth in demand for medical or educational assistance is unlikely to be seen as beneficial.

=== Opportunity cost of war ===
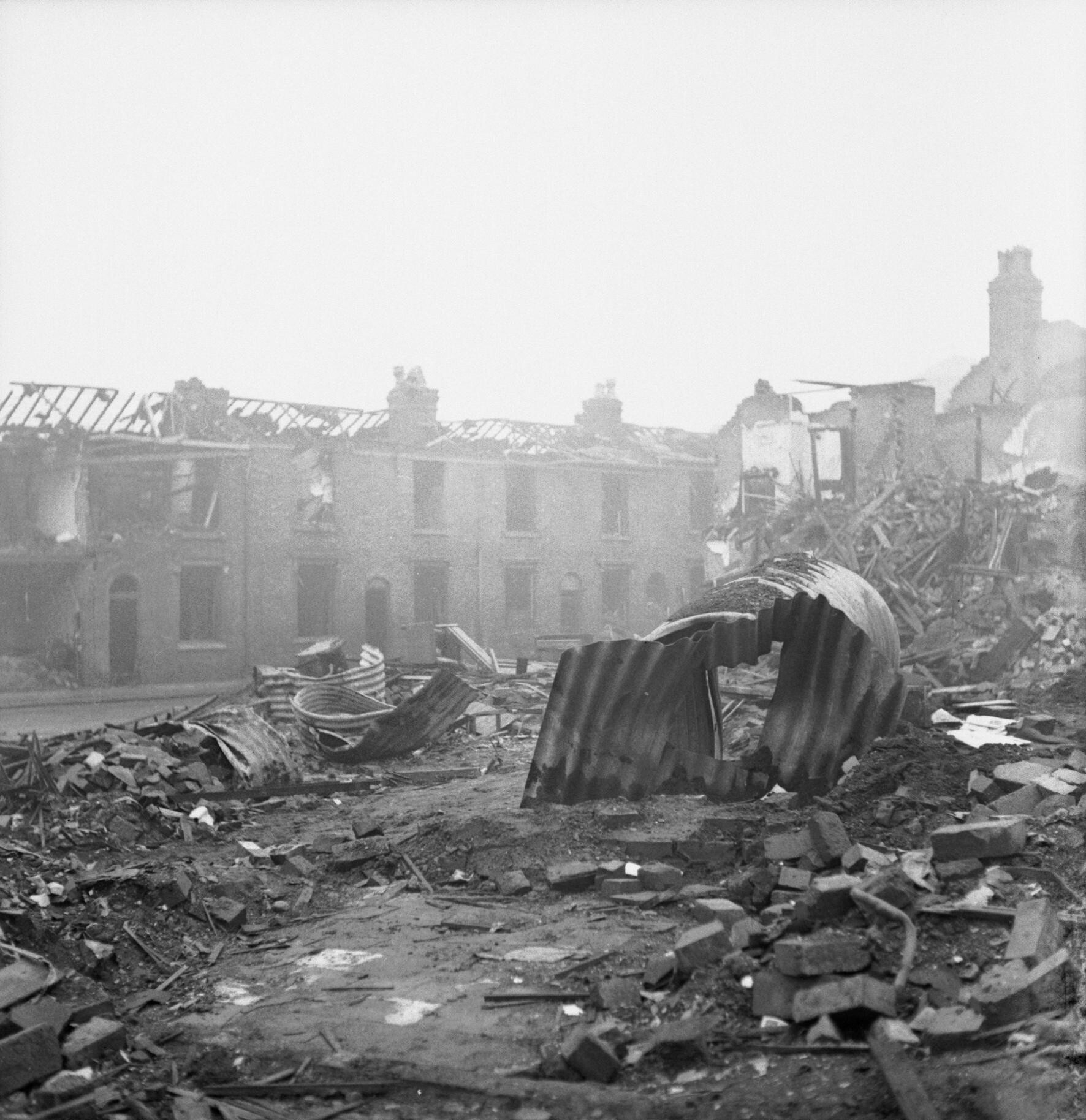
Damage from German aerial bombardment after the 1940 Birmingham Blitz

Occasionally the argument has been made that war is a benefactor to society and that "war is good for the economy." A variant of this argument suggests that, while war cannot be fairly called a benefactor, it can and sometimes does confer some economic benefits. However, this belief is often given as an example of the broken window fallacy. The money spent on the war effort (or peacetime defense spending), for example, is money that cannot be spent on food, clothing, health care, or other sectors of the economy. The stimulus felt in one sector of the economy comes at a direct – but hidden – cost (via foreclosed production possibilities) to other sectors.

Bastiat himself argued against the claim that hiring men to be soldiers was inherently beneficial to the economy in the second chapter of That Which is Seen, and That Which is Not Seen, "The Disbanding of Troops".

According to Hazlitt:

It is never an advantage to have one's plants destroyed by shells or bombs unless those plants have already become valueless or acquired a negative value by depreciation and obsolescence. ... Plants and equipment cannot be replaced by an individual (or a socialist government) unless he or it has acquired or can acquire the savings, the capital accumulation, to make the replacement. But war destroys accumulated capital. ... Complications should not divert us from recognizing the basic truth that the wanton destruction of anything of real value is always a net loss, a misfortune, or a disaster, and whatever the offsetting considerations in a particular instance, can never be, on net balance, a boon or a blessing.

== See also ==
- Cobra effect
- Creative destruction
- Disaster capitalism
- Dutch disease (economics)
- Jevons paradox
- Luddite fallacy
- Lump of labor fallacy
- Opportunity cost
- Rent-seeking
- Robot tax
- Spending multiplier
- Tax choice
- Technological unemployment
- Uneconomic growth
- Zero-sum game
- Zero-sum thinking
