= Robert Leroux (sociologist) =

Robert Leroux is a sociology professor at the University of Ottawa. He holds a B.A. in History and a master's degree in Sociology from the Université de Montréal, and attained a Ph.D. in Sociology from Université Laval in 1996. He completed a post-doctorate at the C.N.R.S. (Centre national de la recherche scientifique) in 1999. He works on the history of social sciences and liberal thought. The French version of his book Political Economy and Liberalism: The Economic Contribution of Frédéric Bastiat was rewarded with the "Prix Charles Dupin" by the Académie des Sciences Morales et Politiques of Paris, Economics Section, in 2008. The English translation was published in 2011 at Routledge. He published the first book in French entirely devoted to the Austrian economist Ludwig von Mises in 2009. He died in 2022.

== Published books ==
- (ed.) The Anthem Companion to Maurice Halbwachs, London, Anthem Press, London, 2020.
- (ed.) The Anthem Companion to Gabriel Tarde, Anthem Press, London, 2018.
- Aux fondements de l'industrialisme: Comte, Dunoyer et la pensée libérale en France, (Paris, Hermann, 2015).
- (With David M. Hart), L'Âge d'or du libéralisme français, (Paris, Ellipses, 2014).
- (With David M. Hart), French Liberalism in the 19th Century: An Anthology, (London and New York, Routledge. 2012).
- Gabriel Tarde, vie, oeuvres, concepts (Paris: Ellipses, 2011).
- Ludwig von Mises, vie, œuvres, concepts (Paris: Ellipses, 2009)
- Lire Bastiat, Science sociale et libéralisme (Paris: Hermann, 2008).
- Political Economy and Liberalism: The Economic Contribution of Frédéric Bastiat (Routledge, Series: Routledge Studies in the History of Economics, pp. 256
- Édouard Montpetit : Réflexions sur la question nationale (Montréal: Bibliothèque québécoise, 2005).
- Cournot sociologue (Paris: Presses Universitaires de France, pp. 200, 2004)
- Y a-t-il encore une sociologie ? Raymond Boudon with Robert Leroux, (Paris: Odile Jacob, pp. 250, 2003)
- Histoire et sociologie en France (Paris: Presses Universitaires de France, pp. 269, 1998)
