= The Revolt of Mamie Stover =

Book by William Bradford Huie

- First edition
- Author: William Bradford Huie
- Language: English
- Release number: 1
- Genre: Fiction
- Publisher: Duell, Sloan & Pearce
- Publication date: 1951
- Publication place: United States
- Media type: Print
- Pages: 248
- OCLC: 1896792
- Followed by: The Americanization of Emily

The Revolt of Mamie Stover is a 1951 novel by William Bradford Huie about a young woman from Mississippi who goes to Hollywood to work as an actress. Driven into prostitution, she moves to Honolulu, works at a brothel and takes it over, challenges restrictions against prostitutes after the US armed forces are built up on the island, buys real estate, and becomes a wealthy war profiteer.

== Plot ==
The Revolt of Mamie Stover is an allegory for the decline of American society because of the country-wide democratization that conflict made possible. Using a Honolulu prostitute to state his case, Huie shows her rise economically, socially, and politically with the aid, in part, of the federal government as she flouts local regulation (prostitution itself being legal at the time). As the war progresses, Stover becomes a war profiteer, coming to control property, accumulating vast wealth in cash, and visiting proscribed beaches in the company of U.S. military officers.

The Revolt of Mamie Stover is the first volume in a trilogy, including The Americanization of Emily (1959), and Hotel Mamie Stover (1963), all of which have the same narrator. In the first and third books, he is primarily present in order to observe and report, and in the second he relates his experiences in the late stages of World War II.

== Adaptation ==
A movie version directed by Raoul Walsh was released in 1956 with Jane Russell in the title role. The screenplay essentially dropped the Hollywood critique.
