= The Execution of Private Slovik =

1974 television film directed by Lamont Johnson

- Genre: Biography; Drama
- Written by: William Bradford Huie; Lamont Johnson; Richard Levinson; William Link
- Directed by: Lamont Johnson
- Starring: Martin Sheen; Ned Beatty; Gary Busey; Mariclare Costello
- Music by: Hal Mooney
- Country of origin: United States
- Original language: English

Production
- Executive producers: Richard Levinson; William Link
- Producer: Richard Dubelman
- Production locations: Montréal, Canada; RMS Queen Mary; 1126 Queens Highway; Long Beach, California
- Cinematography: Bill Butler
- Editor: Frank Morriss
- Running time: 120 minutes
- Production company: Universal Television
- Budget: $180,000

Original release
- Network: NBC
- Release: March 13, 1974

The Execution of Private Slovik is a nonfiction book by William Bradford Huie, published in 1954, and an American television movie that aired on NBC on March 13, 1974. The film was written for the screen by Richard Levinson, William Link, and director Lamont Johnson; the film stars Martin Sheen, and also features Charlie Sheen in his second film in a small role.

== Plot ==
The book and the film tell the story of Private Eddie Slovik, the only American military serviceman executed for desertion (during World War II) since the American Civil War.

== Background ==
The film starred Martin Sheen as Private Slovik, a performance for which he received an Emmy Award nomination for Best Lead Actor in a Drama. Sheen said he did not think actors should be compared, and made it clear he would refuse the award. Many critics and viewers consider this to be one of Sheen's finest performances. The film was nominated for five Emmy Awards, including "Outstanding Special - Comedy or Drama", and was one of the bases of a Peabody Award given that year to NBC for dramatic programs.

== Cast ==
- Martin Sheen as Private Eddie Slovik
- Mariclare Costello as Antoinette Slovik
- Ned Beatty as Father Stafford
- Gary Busey as Jimmy Feedek
- Matt Clark as Dunn
- Charles Haid as Brockmeyer
- Kathryn Grody as Margaret
- Paul Lambert as Joe Sirelli
- Jon Cedar as Holloway
- Laurence Haddon as Piper
- Paul Shenar as Crawford
- Charlie Sheen as kid at wedding (uncredited)

== Development ==
In 1949, a Pentagon source revealed to Huie a European graveyard containing the remains of unidentified American soldiers. Huie's investigation identified Slovik's name and grave. Huie's account of Slovik is an example of his style of reporting and his tendency to anger Dwight D. Eisenhower, who had authorized the execution as commander of the Allied Forces, and who tried to stop publication of the book.

Frank Sinatra announced in 1960 that he would produce a film adaptation of The Execution of Private Slovik, with the screenplay to be written by Albert Maltz, who was one of the Hollywood 10 blacklisted after they refused to testify to the House Un-American Activities Committee (HUAC) in the McCarthy era. This announcement evoked tremendous outrage, with Sinatra accused of being a Communist sympathizer. As he was campaigning for John F. Kennedy for president of the United States, the Kennedy campaign became concerned and prevailed upon Sinatra to cancel the project. Sinatra sold its film rights to Richard Dubelman in 1969 for “close to $100,000” or approximately 2 1/2 times its original price. It was Dubelman's debut as a feature film producer despite Universal Pictures acquiring the project for both Richard Levinson and William Link three years later in 1972.

== Reception ==
John J. O'Connor of The New York Times praised NBC, Levinson and Link for their participation in the project, but added that it was also part of the problem with the film when he explained, "The production is striving for provocative drama. The book is brilliant journalism. The one form doesn't necessarily have anything to do with the other." He was appreciative of Sheen's "intensely sincere portrayal" of Slovik but noted that the actor was "given no secure 'handle' on the character. Eddie is always seen through the eyes of others. His letters are reduced to voiceover narration delivered in child‐like monotony." He also wrote about Johnson having "overcompensated in attempting to create dramatic tension" and that the two sequences pertaining to the execution were "drawn out to self-defeating lengths."

Television critic Matt Zoller Seitz in his 2016 book co-written with Alan Sepinwall titled TV (The Book) named The Execution of Private Slovik as the third greatest American TV-movie of all time, behind Duel (1971) and The Positively True Adventures of the Alleged Texas Cheerleader-Murdering Mom (1993). Seitz praised Martin Sheen's performance as "one of his finest" and stated that the film is "as close to a perfect character study as network TV has produced, quietly outraged yet somehow resolutely unsentimental".

== Historical accuracy ==
The military service record of Slovik, which is now a public archival record available from the Military Personnel Records Center, provides a detailed account of his actual execution. It was upon this that most of the film was based.

== In popular culture ==
- The 1963 World War II film The Victors includes a scene depicting the Christmas Eve execution of a GI deserter modeled after Slovik, accompanied by a Sinatra Christmas recording.
- In Kurt Vonnegut's 1969 novel Slaughterhouse-Five, Billy Pilgrim finds an abandoned copy of Huie's book about Slovik and reads through it while in a waiting room.
- The Canadian novel Execution and its adaptations tell a similar tale, based on the execution of Canadian soldier Harold Pringle for desertion in World War II.

== See also ==
- List of American films of 1974
