= Economics in One Lesson =

Book by Henry Hazlitt

- First edition
- Author: Henry Hazlitt
- Language: English
- Subject: Economics
- Publisher: Harper & Brothers
- Publication date: 1946
- Publication place: United States
- Pages: 218
- ISBN: 0517548232
- OCLC: 167574

Economics in One Lesson is an introduction to economics written by Henry Hazlitt and first published in 1946. It is based on Frédéric Bastiat's essay Ce qu'on voit et ce qu'on ne voit pas (English: "What is Seen and What is Not Seen").

The "One Lesson" is stated in Part One of the book: "The art of economics consists in looking not merely at the immediate but at the longer effects of any act or policy; it consists in tracing the consequences of that policy not merely for one group but for all groups." Part Two consists of twenty-four chapters, each demonstrating the lesson by tracing the effects of one common economic belief, and exposing common economic belief as a series of fallacies.

Among its policy recommendations are the advocacy of free trade, an opposition to price controls, an opposition to monetary inflation, and an opposition to fiscal policy, such as stimulative governmental expenditures, arguing:

There are men regarded today as brilliant economists, who deprecate saving and recommend squandering on a national scale as the way of economic salvation; and when anyone points to what the consequences of these policies will be in the long run, they reply flippantly, as might the prodigal son of a warning father: 'In the long run we are all dead.' And such shallow wisecracks pass as devastating epigrams and the ripest wisdom.

== Summary ==
In the preface to "Economics in One Lesson," Henry Hazlitt explains that the book is a critical analysis of economic fallacies that are prevalent and have become a new orthodoxy. The book seeks to dissect and expose these errors, particularly the central error from which they stem. Hazlitt argues that the shortest and surest way to understand economics is through a dissection of such errors. He states that this book is primarily one of exposition and makes no claim to originality with regard to any of the chief ideas that it expounds. Hazlitt acknowledges his indebtedness to Frédéric Bastiat, Philip Wicksteed, and Ludwig von Mises, whose ideas have influenced the present work. He also mentions that when analyzing fallacies, he has thought it less advisable to mention particular names than in giving credit. The object of this book is not to expose the special errors of particular writers, but economic errors in their most frequent, widespread, or influential form. Hazlitt concludes by saying that he hopes that the book will be forgiven for making rare reference to statistics as he believes that those who are interested in specific economic problems are advised to read current "realistic" discussions of them, with statistical documentation.

Chapter 1, "The Lesson", explains that economics is a field filled with fallacies because of the difficulties inherent in the subject and the special pleading of selfish interests. Every group has economic interests antagonistic to other groups. Another factor is the tendency of people to overlook the secondary consequences of a policy, focusing only on the immediate effects on a specific group. The difference between good and bad economics lies in the ability to look beyond the immediate effects and consider the longer-term and indirect consequences for all groups. Nine-tenths of economic fallacies arise from ignoring this lesson. Finally, the art of economics consists of looking not just at the immediate effects of a policy but at its longer-term effects for all groups.

Chapter 2, "The Broken Window", uses the example of a broken window to demonstrate what Hazlitt considers the fallacy that destruction can be good for the economy. He argues that while the broken window may create work for the glazier, the money the shopkeeper has to spend on replacing the window means that he cannot spend it elsewhere in the economy, such as on a new suit from a tailor. The potential business for the tailor is lost, and the community is worse off overall. Hazlitt stresses the importance of considering all parties involved in an economic transaction, not just those immediately visible.

Chapter 3, "The Blessings of Destruction", discusses what Hazlitt considers the persistent fallacy of the broken window, which is often used to justify the benefits of destruction, particularly in times of war. He points out that although destruction may lead to a need for rebuilding, it does not necessarily lead to effective demand or increased purchasing power, as it diverts demand from one area to another. Additionally, wartime inflation, which people may perceive as good economic results, can be produced just as well by peacetime inflation. Finally, the supply of goods is what constitutes demand in an exchange economy, and wartime destruction inevitably leads to a shrinking in total demand.

Chapter 4, "Public Works Mean Taxes", examines what Hazlitt considers the fallacy of government spending as a solution to economic problems. Hazlitt argues that every dollar of government spending must be raised through a dollar of taxation. Public works, such as streets and roads, armories, and buildings for essential government services are necessary, but public works built primarily "to provide employment" are problematic. When employment becomes the end, need becomes a subordinate consideration, and "projects" have to be invented. Hazlitt concludes that for every public job created by a government project, a private job has been destroyed somewhere else. He argues that government spending is not a panacea and must be viewed in the larger context of secondary consequences, including jobs destroyed by taking money from taxpayers.

Chapter 5, "Taxes Discourage Production", argues that taxes discourage production and have a negative impact on the economy. The government cannot simply take money from one person and give it to another without consequences. Taxes affect the actions and incentives of those from whom they are taken, and high taxes discourage risk-taking and entrepreneurship, resulting in fewer new jobs and less economic growth. While some taxes are necessary for essential government functions, excessive taxes are counterproductive and discourage private production and employment. The government cannot solve the problem of unemployment by creating it through excessive taxation.

Chapter 6, "Credit Diverts Production", discusses the dangers of government "encouragement" to businesses in the form of direct grants of government credit or guarantees of private loans. He focuses on government loans to farmers, explaining that proposals for more credit are really proposals for increased debt. Hazlitt argues that loans made by private lenders differ from those made by government agencies because private lenders risk their own funds and are careful to investigate the assets and business acumen of the borrower, whereas government lenders take risks with taxpayers' money that private lenders will not take. Hazlitt concludes that the faith in government lending policies springs from two acts of shortsightedness: looking at the matter only from the standpoint of the borrowers and thinking only of the first half of the transaction.

Hazlitt argues against the idea of government assuming risks that are "too great for private industry." This would lead to favoritism, scandals, and an increase in demand for socialism. Hazlitt states that government loans and subsidies to businesses would waste capital and reduce production. Private lenders are cautious with their money and investigate proposals before investing in them, while government lenders are likely to make mistakes and invest in inefficient projects. Government loans and subsidies would tax successful private businesses to support unsuccessful ones, which is not a paying proposition in the long run.

Chapter 7, "The Curse of Machinery", discusses what Hazlitt considers the myth that machines create unemployment. Hazlitt notes that the belief that machines cause unemployment leads to preposterous conclusions, and cites Adam Smith's "Wealth of Nations," which shows how machinery revolutionized pin-making and increased productivity. Hazlitt also highlights that the Industrial Revolution was met with resistance, particularly in the stocking industry, where machines were destroyed, and the inventors were threatened. Nevertheless, the number of people employed in the cotton industry increased by 4,400%, and technological advances in the maritime and steel industries were met with pessimism, but ultimately led to more efficient production methods.

Hazlitt discusses what he considers the fallacy that labor-saving machinery and technical progress lead to unemployment and misery. The author argues that the introduction of such machinery can increase employment and benefit society. The author uses the example of a clothing manufacturer who adopts a machine that reduces the labor required to make overcoats. Although half of the labor force may be dropped, the manufacturer would have only adopted the machine if it would have saved labor in the long run. After the machine has produced economies sufficient to offset its cost, the manufacturer has more profits than before, which can be used to expand operations, invest in other industries, or increase personal consumption. In any case, these extra profits indirectly provide jobs, and competition among manufacturers can lead to further employment opportunities.

Hazlitt argues that the fear of machines taking jobs is unfounded. He explains that machines do not necessarily replace workers, but they increase production and, thus, raise the standard of living. He gives examples of newly created trades in the past that have created more jobs as the product was improved and the cost reduced. Hazlitt also notes that machines have significantly increased the population of the world as they made it possible to support it. Hazlitt warns, however, that we should not only focus on the long-run and broad view but also consider the immediate effects on certain groups of people. While some may lose jobs, others may gain them or benefit from the increased production and lower prices. Finally, Hazlitt emphasizes that the primary function of machines is to increase production and economic welfare, not necessarily to create jobs.

Chapter 8, "Spread-The-Work Schemes", discusses what Hazlitt considers the economic fallacy that creating jobs is an end in itself. He argues that this belief is often used to justify inefficient and uneconomical practices, such as the arbitrary subdivision of labor in unions. The author also examines various schemes to "spread the work," such as shortening the working week, which are proposed to create more jobs. However, he argues that such schemes often lead to a reduction in productivity, and may not necessarily create more jobs. Ultimately, the author contends that the focus should be on increasing productivity, which leads to increased wealth and a higher standard of living for everyone.

Chapter 9, "Disbanding Troops and Bureaucrats", discusses the fear of unemployment that arises when millions of soldiers are released into the labor market after a war. Hazlitt argues that the fear is misplaced because the soldiers will become self-supporting civilians, and their release from the army will free up funds for taxpayers to buy additional goods, increasing civilian demand and employment. Similarly, he argues that the same reasoning applies to civilian government officials who are not performing services for the community reasonably equivalent to the remuneration they receive. Removing unnecessary officeholders will not cut down on the national income, but instead, will free up funds for taxpayers and encourage officeholders to take up private jobs or start businesses, making them productive members of society.

Chapter 10, "The Fetish of Full Employment", argues that the goal of any nation should be to maximize production rather than just focusing on full employment. Full employment is a necessary by-product of maximizing production, but it is not the end goal. Hazlitt explains that full employment can be achieved through coercion, such as in Nazi Germany or in prisons, but this does not necessarily lead to maximum production. Hazlitt also criticizes the idea that a thirty-hour workweek or make-work practices are preferable for creating jobs, as they do not necessarily increase productivity or output. Instead, he suggests that policies should be focused on maximizing production to improve the overall standard of living and create more opportunities for distribution.

Chapter 11, "Who's 'Protected' by Tariffs?", discusses what Hazlitt considers the fallacy of protectionism in international trade. Hazlitt argues that many people and governments fail to see the long-term effects of tariffs and trade barriers and instead focus on the immediate effects on specific groups. He gives the example of an American manufacturer of woolen sweaters who argues that a tariff is necessary to protect his business and the jobs of his employees. However, if the tariff were removed, the prices of the sweaters would decrease, making them more affordable for consumers and leading to an increase in employment in other industries. Additionally, the purchase of English sweaters with the money saved would generate dollars for Americans to buy other goods, thus boosting employment in other industries. Hazlitt concludes that the fallacy of protectionism lies in failing to consider the long-term effects on the whole community.

Hazlitt explains that a tariff does not increase American wages but reduces them in the long run. When consumers pay more for a tariff-protected product, they have less money to buy other goods. Tariffs create an artificial barrier against foreign goods, and American labor, capital, and land are deflected from what they can do more efficiently to what they do less efficiently. This reduces the average productivity of American labor and capital. The tariff reduces the general purchasing power of the consumer's income, and whether the net effect of the tariff is to lower wages or raise prices depends on the monetary policies followed. Tariff walls reduce the value of the investment in transport efficiency and create an expense in surmounting tariff obstacles. In summary, tariffs do not benefit all producers but only help the protected producers at the expense of other American producers, especially those with large potential export markets.

Chapter 12, "The Drive for Exports", explains the inconsistency in the common desire for exports in international trade. The author points out that, logically, imports and exports must equal each other in the long run, and the greater the exports, the greater the imports required to get paid. Additionally, a foreigner's purchase of domestic goods requires funds to be available to them, and without imports, there can be no exports. The author argues that foreign exchange is a clearing transaction that cancels out debts and credits, similar to domestic trade, and that discrepancies in balances of imports and exports are often settled by shipments of gold or any other commodity. The author also cautions against the belief that huge loans should be made to foreign countries for the sake of increasing exports, as it would lead to misunderstandings and bad relations later, and a nation cannot grow rich by giving goods away.

Chapter 13, "'Parity' Prices", discusses the argument for "parity" prices is that agriculture is the most basic and important industry that must be preserved at all costs because the prosperity of everybody else depends upon the prosperity of the farmer. This argument is flawed, according to Hazlitt, because there is no sound reason for taking the particular price relationships that prevailed in a particular year or period and regarding them as sacrosanct or necessarily more "normal" than those of any other period. Additionally, if the price relationships between agricultural and industrial products that prevailed from August 1909 to July 1914 ought to be preserved perpetually, then every commodity's price relationship at that time should also be preserved perpetually.

Hazlitt discusses what he considers the fallacy that higher prices for farmers will result in increased prosperity and full employment. He argues that while the increase in prices may result in higher purchasing power for farmers, it also leads to a decrease in purchasing power for city workers who have to pay higher prices for agricultural products. Additionally, the policy of increasing prices often involves a forced cut in the production of farm commodities, which leads to a destruction of wealth and less food to be consumed. Hazlitt highlights the fact that the principle of "parity" prices is not a public-spirited economic plan but a device for subsidizing a special interest, as it benefits farmers at the expense of city workers and taxpayers.

Chapter 14, "Saving the X Industry", discusses the common argument of saving dying industries through subsidies, tariffs, or higher prices. The author argues that while the argument may be justified in some cases, it ignores the negative consequences of such actions, such as reduced efficiency, decreased innovation, and the opportunity cost of diverting resources from more productive industries. He warns that these attempts to save dying industries could lead to decreased competition, higher prices, and a lack of innovation, which ultimately harms the economy as a whole.

Chapter 15, "How the Price System Works", argues that economic proposals must be analyzed for their long-term and widespread effects, not just their immediate and limited consequences. What Hazlitt considers the fallacy of isolation, or looking at an industry or process in isolation, is the starting point of many economic fallacies. The chapter explains the problem of production and consumption, and how the price system works to allocate resources efficiently in a market economy. It uses the examples of Robinson Crusoe and the Swiss Family Robinson to illustrate how economic decisions are made in relation to all other decisions in a society.

Hazlitt explains how a society solves the problem of alternative applications of labor and capital by using the price system. Prices are determined by supply and demand, and they affect supply and demand. The constant interrelationships of production costs, prices, and profits determine which commodities will be produced and in what quantities. The private enterprise system is made up of machines with their own governors that are interconnected and influence each other. Each departure from the desired speed sets in motion the forces that tend to correct that departure. The relative supply of thousands of different commodities is regulated under the system of competitive private enterprise. When people want more of a commodity, their competitive bidding raises its price, which stimulates producers to increase their production. In the same way, if the demand falls off for some product, its price and the profit in making it go lower, and its production declines. The author also notes that those who criticize the price system do so because they do not understand it, and they look at one industry in isolation without considering the larger picture. An economy in equilibrium can only expand one industry at the expense of other industries, and a shrinkage in one industry releases labor and capital to permit the expansion of other industries.

Chapter 16, "'Stabilizing' Commodities", discusses the concept of stabilizing commodity prices, which attempts to lift the prices of certain commodities permanently above their natural market levels. This practice is generally advocated by pressure groups and bureaucrats who aim to intervene in the market. Their arguments usually state that the commodities are selling below their natural levels and that producers cannot make a living from it, so the government must intervene to prevent scarcity and exorbitant prices in the future.

One of the most common methods proposed to stabilize commodity prices is through government loans to farmers to hold their crops off the market. However, this argument is not supported by theory or experience, as speculators are essential to farmers' welfare, and they are the ones who take risks to stabilize prices. Farmers and millers can protect themselves through the markets, and the profits of farmers and millers depend mainly on their skill and industry, not on market fluctuations.

When the state steps in and either buys the farmers' crops or lends them money to hold the crops off the market, it becomes an ever-political granary. The farmers are encouraged, with taxpayers' money, to withhold their crops excessively, and the politicians or bureaucrats who initiate the policy always place the so-called "fair" price for the farmer's product above the price that supply and demand conditions at the time justify. This leads to a falling off in buyers.

Hazlitt discusses how government restrictions on agricultural production, which are intended to raise prices, actually end up harming the overall economy by reducing output, raising costs, and reducing real wages and incomes. Additionally, attempts to control international commodity prices and trade through government planning are likely to result in decreased individual freedoms and living standards for ordinary citizens. The author argues that the best way to ensure an efficient and prosperous economy is to rely on the free forces of the market rather than government intervention.

Chapter 17, "Government Price-Fixing", discusses the effects of the government's attempts to keep the prices of commodities below their natural market levels. The author argues that these attempts lead to an increase in demand and a reduction in supply, causing a shortage of that commodity. This is the opposite of what the government regulators wanted to achieve as the commodities selected for maximum price-fixing are the ones that they want to keep in abundant supply. The author then discusses various devices and controls adopted by the regulators, including rationing, cost-control, subsidies, and universal price-fixing, to avert these consequences.

Hazlitt argues against price-fixing and its consequences, claiming that although price-fixing may seem to work for a while, especially during times of crisis, it will eventually cause demand to exceed supply. The government must then ration more commodities to prevent a black market from developing. This will ultimately lead to a regimented, totalitarian economy with limited liberties. Hazlitt also points out that price control creates a black market, which causes economic and moral harm. New firms that are willing to violate the law take the place of large, established firms. This promotes dishonesty and demoralization. Price-fixing authorities often favor politically powerful groups such as workers and farmers, leading to a decline in living standards. Hazlitt concludes that legal price ceilings do not address the root causes of price increases, which are either a scarcity of goods or a surplus of money.

Chapter 18, "Minimum Wage Laws", explains the harmful effects of minimum wage laws on the labor market. A minimum wage law can only achieve good in proportion to its modest aims, and the more ambitious the law is, the more likely its harmful effects will exceed its good effects. Hazlitt points out that a wage is a price, and raising the minimum wage above the market value will result in increased unemployment. The only exception is when a group of workers is receiving wages below their market value. Relief programs for unemployment caused by minimum wage laws would create a situation where a man is deprived of self-respect and independence, society of his services, and lowered earnings. Hazlitt suggests unionization as a better alternative to correct low wages in special circumstances or localities where competitive forces do not operate freely.

Chapter 19, "Do Unions Really Raise Wages?", argues that the power of labor unions to raise wages over the long run and for the whole working population has been enormously exaggerated. Hazlitt contends that wages are basically determined by labor productivity, and it is for this reason that wages in the United States were incomparably higher than wages in England and Germany during the decades when the "labor movement" in the latter two countries was far more advanced. Unions can serve a useful function in assuring that all their members get the true market value of their services, especially when the competition of workers for jobs, and of employers for workers, does not work perfectly. Hazlitt recognizes that individual workers may not know the true market value of their services to an employer, and without the help of a union or knowledge of "union rates," they may be in a weaker bargaining position. However, unions can go beyond their legitimate functions and embrace short-sighted and anti-social policies when they seek to fix the wages of their members above their real market worth, as such an attempt always leads to unemployment. Hazlitt concludes that unions can become questionable when they use intimidation or violence to enforce their demands, which prevents new workers from taking their place and forces them to take something worse.

Hazlitt argues that an increase in wages is not necessarily gained at the expense of employers' profits. If a wage increase takes place throughout a whole industry, the industry will most likely increase its prices and pass the wage increase along to consumers, resulting in workers having their real wages reduced by having to pay more for a particular product. While it is possible to conceive of a case in which the profits in a whole industry are reduced without any corresponding reduction in employment, it is not likely. The exploitation of capital by labor can be temporary, and it will come to an end as a result of the forcing of marginal firms out of business entirely, the growth of unemployment, and the forced readjustment of wages and profits to the point where the prospect of normal (or abnormal) profits leads to a resumption of employment and production. Hazlitt concludes that unions, though they may for a time be able to secure an increase in money wages for their members, do not increase real wages in the long run and for the whole body of workers.

Chapter 20, "'Enough to Buy Back the Product'", discusses the concept of "functional prices" and "functional wages". Functional prices are prices that encourage the largest volume of production and sales, while functional wages are those that tend to bring about the highest volume of employment and the largest payrolls. The concept of functional wages has been perverted by the Marxist and purchasing-power schools who believe that the only wages that will prevent an economic crash are wages that enable labor to "buy back the product it creates." Hazlitt argues that this theory is flawed as it does not address how much workers need to buy back the product they create, and it can be detrimental to the economy. Hazlitt believes that every increase in hourly wages, unless compensated by an equal increase in hourly productivity, is an increase in costs of production. This increase in costs of production can force marginal producers out of business, leading to a shrinkage in production and growth in unemployment.

Chapter 21, "The Function of Profits", argues that profits play a vital role in guiding and channeling the factors of production to produce goods that are demanded in the market. If there is no profit in producing a good, it is a sign that the resources being used to produce it are better used elsewhere. The chapter also addresses misconceptions about profits, such as the belief that all businesses make large profits. Finally, it argues that limiting profits can discourage entrepreneurship and reduce efficiency.

Chapter 22, "The Mirage of Inflation", discusses the erroneous belief that wealth is equivalent to money or gold and silver, which leads to the belief that more money equals more wealth. He also highlights that the belief in the appeal of inflation stems from this confusion. There are different types of inflationists: some naive people believe that printing more money will make everyone richer; some more sophisticated people believe that limited increases in money or credit will fill the alleged gap or deficiency in the purchasing power; and more knowing inflationists believe that an increase in commodity prices will not cause any harm but will improve the position of poor debtors, stimulate exports, and discourage imports. Hazlitt explains that there are numerous theories regarding how increased quantities of money will affect prices, and discusses two groups: one that thinks that the quantity of money could be increased by any amount without affecting prices, and the other that believes that the supply of money will be offered against all goods, and therefore, the value of the total quantity of money multiplied by its "velocity of circulation" must always be equal to the value of the goods offered for sale multiplied by the frequency with which they are sold.

Hazlitt argues that inflation is not a solution to economic problems, as it only creates a mirage of benefits for favored groups, while the costs are borne by the rest of the society. Inflation distorts the structure of production, wastes capital, and eventually leads to economic disaster. Once inflation sets in, it is challenging to control the value of money. Hazlitt points out that each generation and country follows the same illusion, believing that inflation will save them from economic stagnation and bring full employment. However, inflation only changes the relationships of prices and costs, and the effects of this change are short-lived. Hazlitt suggests that reducing wage rates directly could be a more direct and honest way of restoring a workable relationship between prices and costs of production.

Chapter 23, "The Assault on Saving", argues in favor of saving and against the idea that spending is superior to saving. The author uses the example of two brothers, Alvin and Benjamin, who inherited a sum that gives them an annual income of $50,000. Alvin spends lavishly on luxuries and, in the process, digs into his capital. Benjamin, on the other hand, spends only $25,000 and saves the rest. He also donates $5,000 to charity, which in turn creates as much employment as if he had spent the money directly on himself. The saved $20,000 is either deposited in a bank, which then lends it to businesses, or invested, which helps create new jobs. Hazlitt argues that saving is essential for economic growth and that spending on frivolities and luxuries diverts resources from producing the essentials of life for those who need them.

Hazlitt discusses the positive impact of saving on the economy, highlighting how it leads to an increase in production and productivity. He gives an example of an eleven-year period in which production increases by 2.5 percentage points each year, with a corresponding increase in the consumption of goods. Hazlitt argues that the enemies of saving make false claims that savings and investment are independent variables that need to be expropriated by the government to be used in useless projects to provide employment. Hazlitt counters that savings can only exceed investment by the amount that is hoarded in cash. He concludes that savings lead to an increase in investment and hence more productivity, which eventually leads to economic growth.

Chapter 24, "The Lesson Restated", emphasizes the importance of recognizing the secondary and general consequences of economic policies. Hazlitt states that economics is a science of tracing consequences and recognizing inevitable implications. He compares it to engineering, where one must determine all the facts and valid deductions to solve a problem. He also suggests that people often fail to recognize the necessary implications of their economic statements. Hazlitt warns that it is essential to consider all sides of the coin before making a proposal and not just the attractive side. He concludes that when studying the effects of various proposals on all groups in the long run, the conclusions that unsophisticated common sense arrives at usually correspond to the correct ones.

Hazlitt discusses the concept of the "Forgotten Man," originally introduced by William Graham Sumner, and how what Hazlitt considers the fallacy of not considering the unintended consequences of government policies falls disproportionately on him. The author also explains how the division of labor creates a situation where people are incentivized to promote scarcity in the goods and services they supply to increase their income. This is not necessarily harmful when free competition exists, but when groups can collude to eliminate competition, it leads to a situation where a group benefits at the expense of everyone else. The chapter concludes by noting that the same principle applies to changes in demand, which can also lead to winners and losers.

Chapter 25, "A Note on Books", recommends several books for those interested in further reading on economics. He suggests some intermediate-length works, such as Frederic Benham's "Economics" and Raymond T. Bye's "Principles of Economics," as well as older books like Edwin Canaan's "Wealth" and John Bates Clark's "Essentials of Economic Theory." Hazlitt also suggests some two-volume works, including Ludwig von Mises' upcoming treatise on economics and Taussig's "Principles of Economics." Additionally, he recommends reading economic classics in reverse historical order and mentions recent works that discuss current ideologies and developments. Finally, Hazlitt notes that while economics has many specialized fields, a firm grasp of basic economic principles is necessary to understand these fields properly.

== Publication history ==
In a paperback edition in 1961, a new chapter was added on rent control, which had not been specifically considered in the first edition apart from government price-fixing in general. A few statistics and illustrative references were brought up to date.

In 1978, a new edition was released. In addition to bringing all illustrations and statistics up to date, an entirely new chapter on rent control replaced the previous one of 1961, and a final new chapter, "The Lesson After Thirty Years," was added.

In 1996, Laissez Faire Books issued a 50th anniversary edition with an introduction by publisher and presidential candidate Steve Forbes.

The book has been translated into many other languages, such as Spanish, German, Russian, Chinese, Korean and Greek. In particular, the Madrid-based Spanish publishing house Unión Editorial, which traditionally publishes books in Spanish language in defense of market economy and liberalism, released La Economía en una lección in 1981, 1996 and 2005. A German edition, titled Economics. Über Wirtschaft und Misswirtschaft, was first released in 1983 by Poller in Stuttgart. In May 2009, it was reprinted by Olzog.

== Reception ==
Economics in One Lesson made the New York Times best-seller list, but quickly fell off since only 3,000 copies were printed. It has since sold over a million copies and is considered a classic by several American conservative, free-market, and libertarian circles. When Ronald Reagan was giving speeches to General Electric plants in the 1950s and 60s, he read Economics in One Lesson which helped influence his economic philosophy. Economics in One Lesson was an important work for the development of neoliberalism in America.

Friedrich Hayek praised the work, referring to it as "a brilliant performance...I know of no other modern book from which the intelligent layman can learn so much about the basic truths of economics in so short a time."

German-American economist Ferdinand A. Hermens wrote: "presidents and cabinet members...could learn a great deal if they would read Hazlitt's book and ponder its implications." French economist Charles Rist referred to the book as a "masterpiece." The Peabody Journal of Education called Economics in One Lesson "[o]ne of the best books published on practical everyday economic."

Nobel Prize laureate Milton Friedman stated: "Hazlitt's explanation of how a price system works is a true classic: timeless, correct, painlessly instructive." Bob McTeer, an economist and former president of the Federal Reserve Bank of Dallas, described Economics in One Lesson as a "wonderful book...If you don't have time to read Bastiat's collected works, try Hazlitt's book." Pulitzer Prize-winning journalist Edwin A. Roberts Jr. wrote: "Fifty years have passed since the book was first published...and it continues to stand as the clearest introduction to what to me is the most engagingly complicated of all academic disciplines. The beauty and strength of Henry Hazlitt's "Economics in One Lesson," of course, is that he uncomplicates the essentials of his subject, and he could do that because he knew vastly more than he put into his book, and he was so facile in his use of language that the writing as well as the content gives pleasure."

Author Tom Butler-Bowdon included Economics in One Lesson in his 50 Classics book series for economics. Philosopher Joseph Heath wrote that Economics in One Lesson is "a book that is as valuable today as when it was first published in 1946...Hazlitt's book should be essential reading for anyone interested in knowing which way is up and which way is down in the world of economics," though Heath criticized Hazlitt for being overly ideological about free-markets. Law professor and economics writer James Kwak wrote that "Hazlitt's portrayal of economics as both easy and powerful was highly seductive."

In a review in the American Economic Review, the book was described as "a vigorous, skillful, and provocative challenge to sophisticated formulations of theory and policy," however "the lesson as a whole is too easy, and the "common-sense" answers are really answers only because the basic problems have been oversimplified so much as to divorce them from the complex reality that confronts us today." A review in the Annals of the American Academy of Political and Social Science agreed with Hazlitt's arguments on the need for greater productive efficiency and the effects of deficit spending but believed monopolies were overlooked in the book. Whereas a review in the Financial Analysts Journal stated: "[o]ne by one the bulwarks of the New Deal are assailed and found wanting. Though the book is small and the lesson short, the afterthought will be long and prolific."

Economist J. Bradford DeLong said Hazlitt's book well states the classical view of economics but does not properly address arguments made by Keynesians. However, in 1959, Hazlitt published The Failure of the New Economics, a detailed, chapter-by-chapter critique of John Maynard Keynes' arguments.

Ralph S. Brown, a law professor, also stated that Hazlitt effectively articulates the principles of classical economics on matters such as tariffs, one-way foreign trade, parity prices, and purchasing-power theory. However, Brown criticized Hazlitt on his concept of equilibrium, price systems, and depressions. Post-Keynesian economist Abba Lerner calls it "one of the finest attacks on topsy-turvy economics" but says Hazlitt should more seriously "consider the possibility of an economy suffering from unemployment".

In 1952, the Norwegian edition was translated and published by Kåre Willoch, who later became the Prime Minister of Norway.

=== Bibliography ===
- Economics in One Lesson. Special Edition for the Foundation for Economic Education. New York: Pocket Books. 1952.
- Economics in One Lesson. New York: Three Rivers Press. 1988. ISBN 978-0517548233.
- Economics in One Lesson: 50th Anniversary Edition. Fox & Wilkes. 1996. ISBN 0930073193. ISBN 0930073207 (hardback)
- Economics in One Lesson. Introduction by Walter Block. Auburn: Ludwig von Mises Institute. 2008. ISBN 978-1933550213.
- Economics in One Lesson. Baltimore: LFB. 2012. ISBN 978-0983541462.
