= Benjamin Anderson =

American economist (1886–1949)

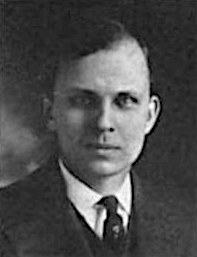
- Born: May 1, 1886; Columbia, Missouri, U.S.
- Died: January 19, 1949 (aged 62); Santa Monica, California, U.S.

Academic background
- Influences: Ludwig von Mises

Academic work
- Discipline: Economics
- School or tradition: Austrian School

Benjamin McAlester Anderson Jr. (May 1, 1886 – January 19, 1949) was an American economist of the Austrian School.

== Early life and education ==
Benjamin Anderson was born in Columbia, Missouri on May 1, 1886, to Benjamin McLean Anderson, a businessman and politician, and Mary Frances Anderson (née Bowling). When he was sixteen years old, Anderson enrolled in classes at the University of Missouri in his hometown and earned his A.B. in 1906. After receiving his bachelor's degree, Anderson accepted an appointment as professor of political economy and sociology at Missouri Valley College, where he remained for a year before becoming head of the department of political economy and sociology at the State Normal School (later known as Missouri State University) in Springfield, Missouri.

Anderson soon became a degree-seeking student again, this time pursuing his A.M. from the University of Illinois at Urbana-Champaign. He completed his master's degree in 1910 and finished his Ph.D. at Columbia University only a year later. Part of his dissertation was later published as Social Value: A Study in Economic Theory, Critical and Constructive.

== Career ==
After earning his doctoral degree, Anderson taught at Columbia University and then Harvard University. During this time, he wrote his Value of Money, a critique of the quantity theory of money. He left Harvard to join New York City's National Bank of Commerce in 1918.

He remained with NBC for only two years, however, before Chase National Bank hired him as an economist and as the new editor of the bank's Chase Economic Bulletin. It was during this time that the scope of Anderson's writing widened to include:

...articles critical of progressive policy in such diverse areas as money, credit, international economic policy, agriculture, taxation, war, government debt, and economic planning. He was a leading opponent of the New Deal and an enthusiastic supporter of a free market gold standard.

In 1939, Anderson again entered the academic community, this time as a professor of economics at the University of California, Los Angeles. He held this position until his death (from a heart attack) at Santa Monica Hospital on January 19, 1949.

== Academic influence ==
Henry Hazlitt, who is often cited as having popularized Austrian economics in the English-speaking world, credits Anderson with acquainting him with the work of Ludwig von Mises and other Austrians. Explains Hazlitt:

I was very lucky in my friendships and lucky in the books I chose. I read a book by Benjamin M. Anderson, whom I later got to know. This was his 1917 book The Value of Money. He was an acute critic of nearly all other writers on money, and especially of Irving Fisher and his mechanical quantity theory of money. Mac Anderson read German, and discussed many German writers on money. He referred to the German edition of Ludwig von Mises's Theory of Money and Credit and wrote: "In von Mises there seems to me to be very noteworthy clarity and power. His Theorie des Geldes und der Umlaufsmittel is an exceptionally excellent book." That impressed me.

According to Mises, Anderson was "one of the outstanding characters in this age of the supremacy of time-servers."

Outside of Austrian circles, though, Anderson's writings encountered a cooler reception from the then-dominant Progressives, who disagreed with his calls for reducing government intervention in the market. According to Henry Hazlitt, Anderson was dismayed by the popular political and theoretical trends that ran counter to the positions that he espoused:

[H]e did become embittered. I remember he was at my house when Landon was running for President against FDR. As the radio returns came rolling in, Mac shook his head and said, "This is the mob." He was very depressed, but I don't think his writing was ever bitter. It remained analytical and objective.

== Personal life ==
Anderson was a skilled chess player and penned the preface to José Raúl Capablanca's A Primer of Chess (1935).

== Publications ==
- Social Value: A Study in Economic Theory Critical and Constructive (1911)
- The Value of Money (1917)
- Effects of the War on Money, Credit and Banking in France and the U.S. (1919)
- "Cheap Money, Gold, and Federal Reserve Bank Policy" (1924). Chase Economic Bulletin, Vol. IV, No. 3, August 4, 1924
- Economics and the Public Welfare: A Financial and Economic History of the United States, 1914–1946 (1949)
