= Henry Hazlitt =

American journalist and writer (1894–1993)

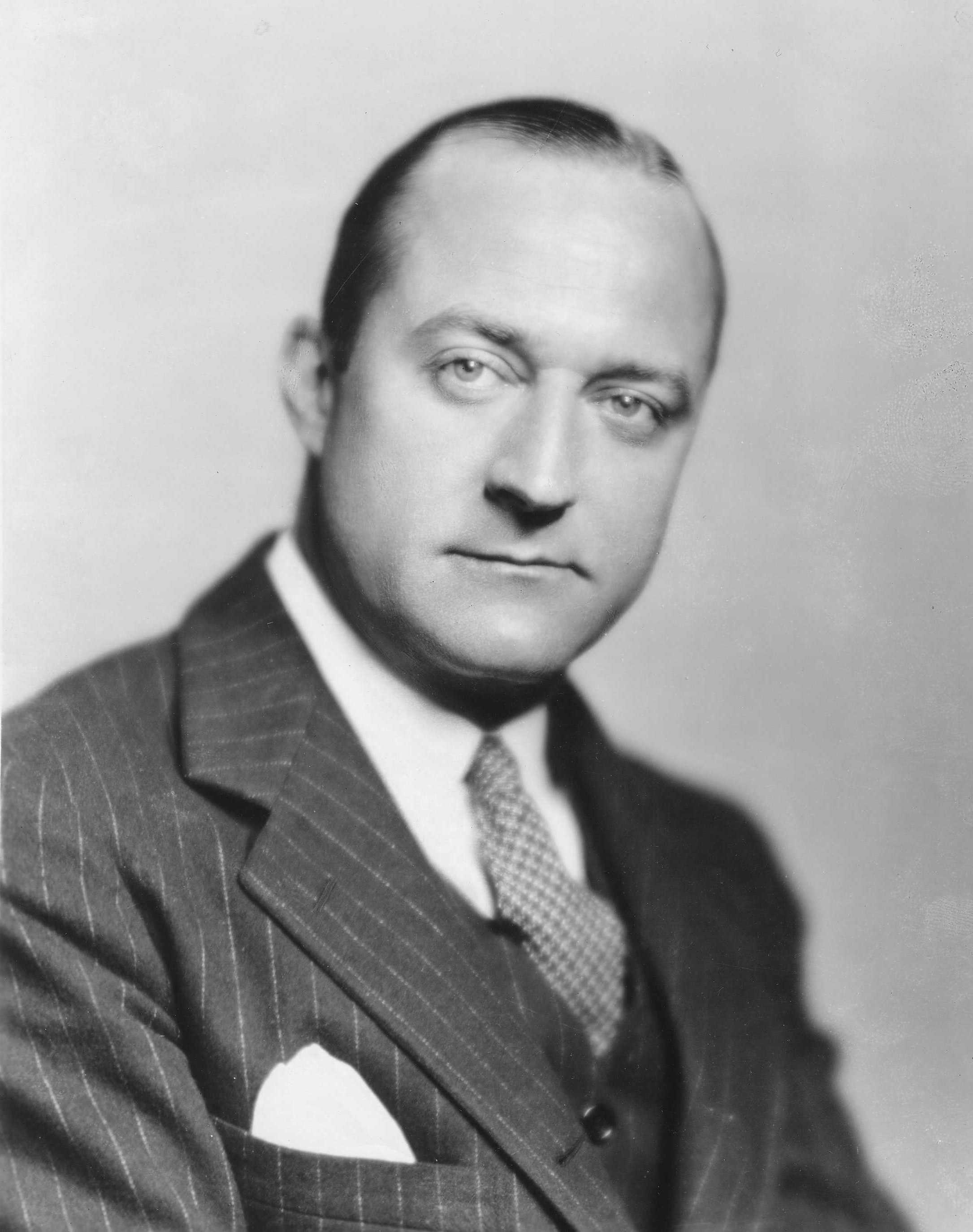
- Born: Henry Stuart Hazlitt; November 28, 1894; Philadelphia, Pennsylvania, U.S.
- Died: July 9, 1993 (aged 98); Fairfield, Connecticut, U.S.

Academic background
- Influences: Benjamin Anderson; Frédéric Bastiat; Jeremy Bentham; David Hume; William James; H. L. Mencken; Ludwig von Mises; Wilhelm Röpke; Adam Smith; Herbert Spencer; Philip Wicksteed

Academic work
- Discipline: Economics; Literary criticism Philosophy
- School or tradition: Austrian School
- Website: www.hazlitt.org

Henry Stuart Hazlitt (/ˈhæzlɪt/; November 28, 1894 – July 9, 1993) was an American journalist, economist, and philosopher known for his advocacy of free markets and classical liberal principles. Over a career spanning more than seven decades, Hazlitt wrote extensively on business, economics, and public policy for prominent publications, including The Wall Street Journal, The Nation, The American Mercury, Newsweek, and The New York Times. He is best known for his 1946 book, Economics in One Lesson, a work grounded in the Austrian school of economics and its belief in the importance of individual liberty in economic decision-making.

Hazlitt was a strong proponent of hard currency and a vocal critic of inflationary practices and government intervention in markets. As a defender of free enterprise, he drew on the ideas of economists such as Ludwig von Mises and Friedrich Hayek, helping popularize their theories for a general audience. Beyond economics, Hazlitt contributed to debates on philosophy and ethics, advocating for what he argued were the moral underpinnings of a free society. He also served as an editorial board member of the libertarian journal The Freeman and was a founding member of the Foundation for Economic Education (FEE), one of the oldest free-market think tanks in the United States.

Throughout his life, Hazlitt's writing and commentary significantly influenced public understanding of economic policy, and his works continue to inspire advocates of liberty and limited government around the world.

== Early life and education ==
Henry Hazlitt was born in Philadelphia, Pennsylvania and raised in Brooklyn, New York. He was a collateral descendant of the British essayist William Hazlitt, but grew up in relative poverty, his father having died when Hazlitt was an infant. His early heroes were Herbert Spencer and William James, and his first ambition was for an academic career in psychology and philosophy. He attended New York's City College, but left after only a short time to support his twice-widowed mother.

As he later wrote, his short time at college "had a greater influence than may at first sight be supposed, not as much from the knowledge gained there, as from the increased consciousness of the knowledge which I still had to gain and the consequent ambition to attain it."

== Career ==
=== Early accomplishments ===
Hazlitt started his career at The Wall Street Journal as secretary to the managing editor when he was still a teenager, and his interest in the field of economics began while working there. His studies led him to The Common Sense of Political Economy by Philip Wicksteed which, he later said, was his first "tremendous influence" in the subject. Hazlitt published his first book, Thinking as a Science at age 21. He wrote the book because he realized—through his intense process of self-education—that it was more important to think clearly than to merely absorb information. As he explains in its opening pages:

Every man knows there are evils in the world which need setting right. Every man has pretty definite ideas as to what these evils are. But to most men one in particular stands out vividly. To some, in fact, this stands out with such startling vividness that they lose sight of other evils, or look upon them as the natural consequences of their own particular evil-in-chief.

To the Socialist this evil is the capitalistic system; to the prohibitionist it is intemperance; to the feminist it is the subjection of women; to the clergyman it is the decline of religion; to Andrew Carnegie it is war; to the staunch Republican it is the Democratic Party, and so on, ad infinitum.

I, too, have a pet little evil, to which in more passionate moments I am apt to attribute all the others. This evil is the neglect of thinking. And when I say thinking I mean real thinking, independent thinking, hard thinking.

=== Military service ===
During World War I, he served in the Army Air Service. While residing in Brooklyn, he enlisted in New York City on February 11, 1918, and served with the Aviation Section of the Signal Enlisted Reserve Corps until July 9, 1918. He was then in Princeton, New Jersey, at the US School of Military Aeronautics until October 22, when he was sent to AS Camp Dick in Dallas, Texas, for a few weeks until November 7, and he was honorably discharged from service with the rank of private first class on December 12, 1918. He returned to New York, residing at Washington Square Park for many years.

=== Editor and author ===
In the early 1920s, he was financial editor of The New York Evening Mail, and during this period, Hazlitt reported his understanding of economics was further refined by frequent discussions with former Harvard economics professor Benjamin Anderson, who was then working for Chase National Bank in Manhattan. Later, when the publisher W. W. Norton suggested he write an official biography of their author Bertrand Russell, Hazlitt spent "a good deal of time," as he described it, with the famous philosopher. Lord Russell "so admired the young journalist's talent" that he had agreed with Norton's proposal, but the project ended after nearly two years of work when Russell declared his intention to write it on his own as an autobiography instead.

During the interwar decades, a vibrant period in the history of American literature, Hazlitt served as literary editor of The New York Sun (1925–1929), and as literary editor of the left-leaning journal, The Nation (1930–1933). In connection with his work for The Nation, Hazlitt also edited A Practical Program for America (1932), a compilation of Great Depression policy considerations. After a series of public debates with socialist Louis Fischer, Hazlitt and The Nation parted ways.

In 1933, Hazlitt published The Anatomy of Criticism, an extended "trialogue" examining the nature of literary criticism and appreciation, regarded by some to be an early refutation of literary deconstruction. In the same year, he became H. L. Mencken's chosen successor as editor of the literary magazine, The American Mercury, which Mencken had founded with George Jean Nathan, as a result of which appointment Vanity Fair included Hazlitt among those hailed in its regular "Hall of Fame" photo feature. Due to increasing differences with the publisher, Alfred A. Knopf Sr., he served in that role for only a brief time, but Mencken wrote that Hazlitt was the "only competent critic of the arts that I have heard of who was at the same time a competent economist, of practical as well as theoretical training," adding that he "is one of the few economists in human history who could really write." (Note: The quotation appears on the book jacket of the first edition of Economics in One Lesson, which may or may not have been its first appearance.)

From 1934 to 1946, Hazlitt was the principal editorial writer on finance and economics for The New York Times, writing both a signed weekly column and most of the unsigned editorials on economics, producing a considerable volume of work. Following World War II, he came into conflict with Arthur Hays Sulzberger, publisher of The New York Times, over the newly established Bretton Woods system which created the World Bank and the International Monetary Fund. Hazlitt opposed the Bretton Woods agreement, primarily fearing the risk of inflation. After agreeing not to write on the topic, he looked for another venue for his work, deciding on Newsweek magazine, for which he wrote a signed column, "Business Tides", from 1946 to 1966.

According to Hazlitt, the greatest influence on his writing in economics was the work of Ludwig von Mises, and he is credited with introducing the ideas of the Austrian School of economics to the English-speaking layman. In 1938, for example, he reviewed the recently published English translation of Mises's influential treatise Socialism for The New York Times, declaring it "a classic" and "the most devastating analysis of socialism yet penned." After the Jewish economist's emigration to the United States from National Socialist-dominated Europe in 1940, Hazlitt arranged for Mises to contribute editorials to The New York Times, and helped to secure for Mises a teaching position at New York University. Along with the efforts of his friends, Max Eastman and John Chamberlain, Hazlitt also helped introduce Hayek's The Road to Serfdom to the American reading public. His 1944 review in The New York Times caused Reader's Digest, where Eastman served as roving editor, to publish one of its trademark condensations, bringing the future Nobel laureate's work to a vast audience.

Author Tom Malone contends that Hazlitt distinguished himself from other economists largely by his skill as a writer:

What set Hazlitt apart from other writers on economics was the incredible clarity of his writing and his ability to make the subject interesting to laymen. He did this by focusing on principles, using practical examples, and writing in a direct and conversational style. He also avoided the technical jargon and reliance on statistics that stud the writing of most economists—to the bane of most readers. When H. L. Mencken selected Hazlitt to succeed him as literary editor at the American Mercury, he called Hazlitt the "only competent critic of the arts that I have heard of who was at the same time a competent economist," as well as "one of the few economists in human history who could really write."

Unlike many other writers of his generation from the political right, Hazlitt never experienced a period when he was a socialist or communist, or a significant change in his classical liberal political views. He was the founding vice president of the Foundation for Economic Education, which also acquired his large personal library in the 1980s. Established by Leonard Read in 1946, FEE is considered to be the first "think tank" for free-market ideas. He was also one of the original members of the classical liberal Mont Pelerin Society in 1947.

With John Chamberlain (and Suzanne La Follette as managing editor), Hazlitt served as editor of the early free market publication The Freeman from 1950 to 1952, and as sole editor-in-chief from 1952 to 1953, and its contributors during his tenure there included Hayek, Mises, and Wilhelm Röpke, as well as the writers James Burnham, John Dos Passos, Max Eastman, John T. Flynn, Frank Meyer, Raymond Moley, Morrie Ryskind, and George Sokolsky. Prior to his becoming editor, The Freeman had supported Senator Joseph McCarthy in his conflict with President Harry Truman on the issue of communism, "undiscriminatingly" according to some critics, but upon becoming editor, Hazlitt changed the magazine's policy to one of support for President Truman.

The Freeman is widely considered to be an important forerunner to the conservative National Review, founded by William F. Buckley, Jr., which from the start included many of the same contributing editors. Hazlitt himself was on the masthead of National Review, either as a contributing editor or, later, as contributor, from its inception in 1955 until his death in 1993. Differences existed between the journals: The Freeman under Hazlitt was more secular and presented a wider range of foreign policy opinion than the later National Review.

Even prior to her success with The Fountainhead, the novelist Ayn Rand was a friend of both Hazlitt and his wife, Frances, and Hazlitt introduced Rand to Mises, bringing together the two figures who would become most associated with the defense of pure laissez-faire capitalism. The two became admirers of Hazlitt and of one another.

Hazlitt became well known both through his articles and by frequently debating prominent politicians on the radio, including: Vice President Henry A. Wallace, Secretary of State Dean Acheson, and U.S. Senators Paul Douglas and Hubert H. Humphrey, the future Vice President. In the early 1950s, he also occasionally appeared on the CBS Television current events program Longines Chronoscope, interviewing figures such as Senator Joseph McCarthy and Congressman Franklin D. Roosevelt, Jr., along with coeditor William Bradford Huie. At the invitation of philosopher Sidney Hook, he was also a participating member of the American Committee for Cultural Freedom in the 1950s.

When he finally left Newsweek in 1966, the magazine replaced Hazlitt with three university professors: "free-market monetarist Milton Friedman of the University of Chicago, middle-of-the-roader Henry Wallich of Yale, and Keynesian Paul A. Samuelson of MIT." His last published scholarly article appeared in the first volume of The Review of Austrian Economics (now, The Quarterly Journal of Austrian Economics) in 1987.

He was awarded an honorary doctoral degree at Universidad Francisco Marroquín in Guatemala.

=== Journalistic career timeline ===
- 1913–1916: The Wall Street Journal
- 1916–1918: New York Evening Post
- 1919–1920: Mechanics and Metals National Bank (monthly financial letter)
- 1921–1923: New York Evening Mail (financial editor)
- 1923–1924: New York Herald (editorial writer)
- 1924–1925: The Sun
- 1925–1929: The Sun (literary editor)
- 1930–1933: The Nation (literary editor)
- 1933–1934: American Mercury (editor)
- 1934–1946: The New York Times (editorial staff)
- 1946–1966: Newsweek (associate & columnist)
- 1950–1952: The Freeman (co–editor)
- 1952–1953: The Freeman (editor–in–chief)
- 1966–1969: Los Angeles Times Syndicate (columnist)

== Economics and philosophy ==
About Hazlitt, Lew Rockwell wrote: "The times call for courage. The times call for hard work. But if the demands are high, it is because the stakes are even higher. They are nothing less than the future of liberty, which means the future of civilization." Rockwell called Economics in One Lesson Hazlitt's "most enduring contribution." With a million copies sold and available in ten languages, it is considered a classic by several American conservative, free-market, and right-libertarian circles, such as at the Mises Institute. Ayn Rand called it a "magnificent job of theoretical exposition", while Congressman Ron Paul ranks it with the works of Frédéric Bastiat and Friedrich Hayek. Hayek himself praised the work, saying that "Henry Hazlitt's explanation of how a price system works is a true classic: timeless, correct, painlessly instructive." Nobel Prize laureate Milton Friedman described it as "a brilliant performance. It says precisely the things which need most saying and says them with rare courage and integrity. I know of no other modern book from which the intelligent layman can learn so much about the basic truths of economics in so short a time." In 1996, Laissez Faire Books issued a 50th anniversary edition with an introduction by publisher and presidential candidate Steve Forbes. Economist Thomas Sowell's work has been described as following in the "Bastiat-Hazlitt tradition" of economic exposition.

Another of Hazlitt's works, The Failure of the New Economics (1959), gives a detailed, chapter-by-chapter critique of John Maynard Keynes's highly influential work The General Theory of Employment, Interest and Money. With reference to Keynes's book, Hazlitt paraphrased a quote attributed to Samuel Johnson, that he was "unable to find in it a single doctrine that is both true and original. What is original in the book is not true; and what is true is not original." Hazlitt also published three books on the subject of inflation, including From Bretton Woods to World Inflation (1984), and two influential works on poverty, Man vs. The Welfare State (1969), and The Conquest of Poverty (1973), thought by some to have anticipated the later work of Charles Murray in Losing Ground. Hazlitt's major work in philosophy, such as The Foundations of Morality (1964), a treatise on ethics defending utilitarianism, builds on the work of David Hume and John Stuart Mill. Hazlitt's 1922 work, The Way to Will-Power was characterized by Lew Rockwell as "a defense of individual initiative against the deterministic claims of Freudian psychoanalysis." In contrast to many other thinkers on the political right, Hazlitt was an agnostic with regard to religious beliefs.

In A New Constitution Now (1942), published during Franklin D. Roosevelt's unprecedented third term as President of the United States, Hazlitt called for the replacement of the existing fixed-term presidential tenure in the United States with a more Anglo-European system of "cabinet" government, under which a head of government who had lost the confidence of the legislature or cabinet might be removed from office after a no-confidence vote in as few as 30 days. In 1951, following Roosevelt's death in 1945, the United States enacted presidential term limits. Hazlitt's 1951 novel The Great Idea, reissued in 1966 as Time Will Run Back, depicts rulers of a centrally-planned socialist dystopia discovering, amid the resulting economic chaos, the need to restore a market pricing-system, private ownership of capital goods and competitive markets.

== Personal life ==
Henry was born to Stuart Clark and Bertha (Zauner) Hazlitt on November 28, 1894, in Philadelphia, Pennsylvania. They resided at 819 North Broad Street in Philadelphia. The Hazlitt family was originally from England, although his paternal grandmother was from Ireland. His maternal grandparents were German immigrants. Henry's father, a clerk, died of diabetes when Henry was only five months old. His mother, Bertha, then married Frederick E. Piebes, who was engaged in manufacturing, and they resided in Brooklyn, where Henry was raised. Henry is listed on the 1905 New York state census as Henry S. Piebes, and he is listed on Frederick's will as Henry Hazlitt Piebes, Frederick's adopted son. His stepfather died in 1907, leaving Henry to support his mother and probably leading to the ambition that enabled him to work at the Wall Street Journal while he was still a teenager.

In 1929, Hazlitt married Valerie Earle, daughter of the noted photographer and Vitagraph film director William P. S. Earle. They were married by the pacifist minister John Haynes Holmes, but later divorced. In 1936, he married Frances Kanes, author of The Concise Bible, with whom he later collaborated to produce an anthology of the Stoic philosophers, The Wisdom of the Stoics: Selections from Seneca, Epictetus, and Marcus Aurelius (1984). They were married until Frances' death in 1991.

Hazlitt died at the age of 98 in Fairfield, Connecticut. At the time of his death, he resided in Wilton, Connecticut.

== Legacy ==
Hazlitt was a prolific writer, authoring 25 works in his lifetime.

In 1981, President Ronald Reagan in his speech before the Conservative Political Action Conference (or "CPAC") named Hazlitt as one of the "[i]ntellectual leaders" (along with Friedrich Hayek, Ludwig von Mises, Milton Friedman, Russell Kirk, James Burnham and Frank Meyer) who had "shaped so much of our thoughts..."

Ludwig von Mises said at a dinner honoring Hazlitt: "In this age of the great struggle in favor of freedom and the social system in which men can live as free men, you are our leader. You have indefatigably fought against the step-by-step advance of the powers anxious to destroy everything that human civilization has created over a long period of centuries... . You are the economic conscience of our country and of our nation."

=== Hazlitt Policy Center ===
On March 1, 2019, the Young Americans for Liberty announced the launch of the Hazlitt Policy Center "to provide YAL's elected officials with modern legislation, facts, and strategies to give them the extra muscle they need to be effective liberty legislators."

== Publications ==
Books

- Thinking as a Science, 1916
- The Way to Will-Power, 1922
- A Practical Program for America, 1932
- The Anatomy of Criticism, 1933
- Instead of Dictatorship, 1933
- A New Constitution Now, 1942
- Freedom in America: The Freeman (with Virgil Jordan), 1945
- The Full Employment Bill: An Analysis, 1945
- Economics in One Lesson, 1946
- Will Dollars Save the World?, 1947
- Forum: Do Current Events Indicate Greater Government Regulation, Nationalization, or Socialization?, Proceedings from a Conference Sponsored by The Economic and Business Foundation, 1948
- The Illusions of Point Four, 1950
- The Great Idea, 1951 (titled Time Will Run Back in Great Britain, revised and rereleased with this title in 1966.)
- The Free Man's Library, 1956
- The Failure of the 'New Economics': An Analysis of the Keynesian Fallacies, 1959
- The Critics of Keynesian Economics (ed.), 1960
- What You Should Know About Inflation, 1960
- The Foundations of Morality, 1964
- Man vs. The Welfare State, 1969
- The Conquest of Poverty, 1973
- To Stop Inflation, Return to Gold, 1974
- The Inflation Crisis, and How To Resolve It, 1978
- From Bretton Woods to World Inflation, 1984
- The Wisdom of the Stoics: Selections from Seneca, Epictetus, and Marcus Aurelius, with Frances Hazlitt, 1984
- The Wisdom of Henry Hazlitt, 1993
- Rules for Living: The Ethics of Social Cooperation, 1999 (an abridgment by Bettina Bien Greaves of Hazlitt's The Foundations of Morality.)
- Business Tides: The Newsweek Era of Henry Hazlitt, 2011

Articles

- Rockwell, Lew. Biography of Henry Hazlitt (1894–1993). Auburn, Alabama: Ludwig von Mises Institute, August 1, 2007.
