= William Bradford Huie =

American journalist and novelist (1910–1986)

- Born: November 13, 1910
- Died: November 20, 1986 (aged 76)

William Bradford Huie (November 13, 1910 – November 20, 1986) was an American writer, investigative reporter, editor, national lecturer, and television host. His credits include 21 books that sold over 30 million copies worldwide. In addition to writing 14 bestsellers, he wrote hundreds of articles that appeared in all of the major magazines and newspapers of the day.

Huie wrote several books about controversial topics related to World War II and the Civil Rights Movement. He practiced checkbook journalism, paying subjects to gain interviews and articles about them. In January 1956 he published an interview in Look magazine in which two of the six white men who killed Emmett Till admitted their guilt and described their crime. He could not acquire releases from the other four, so he altered the story to fit his narrative. They had been acquitted at trial several months previously by an all-white jury.

Six of Huie's books were adapted as feature films during the 1950s, 1960s and 1970s.

== Early life and career ==
Born in Hartselle, Alabama, in 1910, William Bradford Huie was the son of John Bradford and Margaret Lois (Brindley) Huie, and was the eldest of three children. He attended Morgan County High School and graduated as class valedictorian. He attended the University of Alabama, graduating Phi Beta Kappa in 1930.

From 1932 to 1936, Huie worked as a journalist for the Birmingham Post. In 1934, he married his grammar school sweetheart, Ruth Puckett. Their wedding took place in her parents' home in Hartselle. Huie later described the scene in his largely autobiographical first novel, Mud on the Stars (1942).

In late 1938, Huie was in Los Angeles and worked independently as an undercover reporter to gather information on gangster Benjamin "Bugsy" Siegel. He reported on his experiences in the Los Angeles Times and later in the December 1950 issue of The American Mercury, a literary magazine.

== Recognition as journalist ==
Huie's first national recognition came from his article "How To Keep Football Stars In College", Collier's Weekly, 1 January 1941. This piece about the University of Alabama 1940s football program included provocative quotes, such as "We who have recruited Alabama's players know who our competitors have been. And we've offered no higher prices than were necessary to compete in the open market."

== World War II ==
During World War II, Huie served in the U.S. Navy as a lieutenant and a war correspondent from 1943 to 1945, including a period as aide to Vice Admiral Ben Moreell of the Seabees. While chronicling the wartime activity of the Seabees, Lieutenant Huie had special permission to continue his own writing projects, both fiction and nonfiction. He drew from his Navy experiences, including his participation in D-Day, for his 1959 novel The Americanization of Emily. It was adapted as the 1964 film of the same name starring James Garner and Julie Andrews. Both Garner and Andrews consider it the personal favorite of their films.

Discharged in 1945 from the Navy, Huie immediately made his way to the Pacific Theatre as a war correspondent. His experiences at Iwo Jima became the basis for the nonfiction work "The Hero of Iwo Jima", published in The Hero of Iwo Jima and Other Stories in 1962. It was an account of the life of flag-raiser Ira Hayes. Huie's account was developed into the 1961 film The Outsider, starring Tony Curtis. He drew from his experiences in Hawaii during the war for his novel The Revolt of Mamie Stover (1951). This was adapted as the 1956 film of the same name starring Jane Russell. He was on every war front except Russia during World War II.

== The American Mercury ==
Before the war, Huie had been writing for The American Mercury, a literary magazine founded by H. L. Mencken and George Jean Nathan. Like Mencken, Huie was a critic of President Franklin D. Roosevelt's "New Deal" policies during the Great Depression. After the war, he returned to the Mercury, becoming associate editor, then editor. In 1950, publisher Clendenin J. Ryan bought the magazine. Ryan and editor Huie wanted to develop the magazine as a journal of the fledgling American conservative movement, introducing mass-appeal writers such as evangelist Billy Graham, former communist Max Eastman, and long-time Federal Bureau of Investigation director J. Edgar Hoover. Young William F. Buckley Jr., future National Review founder and editor, was one of Huie's early staffers.

By the mid-1950s, however, Huie and Ryan were unable to overcome financial difficulties and were forced to sell the magazine to Russell Maguire, one of its investors. After Huie's departure, Maguire and other owners drove the new American Mercury, in author William A. Rusher's phrase, "toward the fever swamps of anti-Semitism." He believed that they destroyed its legitimacy and contributed to its end. To Huie's disgust, the journal that once featured the work of W. E. B. Du Bois and Langston Hughes became a periodical advocating racism.

== Freelance work (1950s to 1960s) ==
From 1950 to 1955, Huie was a popular speaker, traveling back and forth across the country on the professional lecture circuit. During the same period, he became well known through his appearances on the weekly television current events program Longines Chronoscope, produced in New York City. As a co-editor of the hour-long talk show, he interviewed newsmakers John F. Kennedy, Joseph McCarthy, and Clare Boothe Luce as well as international figures, politicians, scientists, and economists. His program co-editors included figures such as Henry Hazlitt and Max Eastman. Domestic issues, Congressional activity, military defense, the Olympics, and foreign policy were all topics discussed on the program.

In the late 1950s, Huie and his wife resettled permanently in their native Hartselle. Ruth worked as a first grade schoolteacher. Huie continued to write full-time at home as freelance journalist and novelist.

During this period, activism in the Civil Rights Movement increased, and Huie was commissioned by periodicals such as the New York Herald Tribune and Look to cover breaking events in the South. In 1954, the U.S. Supreme Court ruled that segregated public schools were unconstitutional, but most southern jurisdictions made no changes to their schools.

Huie attended the appeal and second trial in 1954 of Ruby McCollum, a wealthy, married black woman in Florida who had shot and killed her white paramour, physician and state senator-elect Dr. Leroy Adams. She testified that he had forced her to have sex and bear his child when she got pregnant. The popular married doctor was being groomed to run for governor of Florida. Huie had been contacted about the case by writer Zora Neale Hurston, who had worked with him earlier at The American Mercury and had covered the first McCollum trial in Live Oak, Florida for the Pittsburgh Courier. The judge had prohibited McCollum from talking to the press.

Huie attended the appeal and second trial, and conducted background investigations of the figures and events. He was arrested on contempt of court charges; the judge cited him for "meddling" in a trial that "could embarrass the community". Huie was freed from jail, and he was pardoned years later. Ruby McCollum: Woman in the Suwannee Jail (1956), his book on the sensational case, became a bestseller; it was banned in Florida. Ebony, Time, and other journals publicized McCollum's story worldwide.

Huie also reported on the lynching of African-American Chicago teenager Emmett Till in Money, Mississippi in 1955. After an all-white jury found the two defendants not guilty, Huie paid the men $4,000 for an interview. They described how and why they committed the murder, and were protected by double jeopardy from being tried again for the crime. Huie published his account in Look in January 1956. Some mainstream journalists criticized what they called his "checkbook journalism". Huie also published Wolf Whistle (1959), a full-length book on the case. Simeon Wright, Till's cousin and an eyewitness to the events at the store and to Till's abduction, refuted the killers' version in Simeon's Story: An Eyewitness Account of the Kidnapping of Emmett Till, his 2010 memoir, written with Herb Boyd.

Huie also reported on various Ku Klux Klan activities, including the 1964 killing of "Freedom Summer" workers James Chaney, Andrew Goodman, and Michael Schwerner. His books on the latter included The Klansman (1965) and Three Lives for Mississippi (1965). The KKK burned a cross on his front lawn in 1967 to try to intimidate him.

Dr. Martin Luther King Jr., president of the Southern Christian Leadership Conference (SCLC), wrote the Introduction for the second edition of Huie's Three Lives for Mississippi. He said that it "is a part of the arsenal decent Americans can employ to make democracy for all truly a birthright and not a distant dream. It relates the story of an atrocity committed on our doorstep." Subsequent editions of the work include an "Afterword" by Juan Williams. In 1970, Huie published He Slew the Dreamer, an account of the assassination of King, for which he had interviewed assassin James Earl Ray.

Huie's book The Execution of Private Slovik (1954) related the historic account of World War II G.I. Eddie Slovik, the only soldier since the American Civil War to be executed for desertion. The government had kept this quiet, not telling his widow how he died. After the book revealed Slovik's story, Huie and others tried for years to get the government to pay his widow a pension, but had no success. He had discussions with Frank Sinatra about adapting the work as a movie. Sinatra dropped it in 1960 due to objections to his choice of screenwriter, a man who was one of the Hollywood Ten blacklisted after refusing to testify to HUAC. The singer was campaigning at the time for John F. Kennedy as president. The book was adapted as a television movie, titled as The Execution of Private Slovik (1974).

== Later years ==
In 1973 Huie's father died. This loss was followed several months later by the death of Huie's wife Ruth from cancer. In 1975. Huie met Martha Hunt Robertson of Guntersville, Alabama, an art instructor at a local college. They married in Huntsville, Alabama on July 16, 1977. They divided their time between their homes in Hartselle and Guntersville. In a few years, the Huies moved to Scottsboro, Alabama. By 1985, they resettled in Guntersville.

Huie wrote one more significant book after Ruth's death. In the Hours of Night is the story of the development of the atomic bomb and its effect on its creators and policy makers. It is based loosely on the life of James Forrestal, Secretary of the Navy during the height of the development.

On November 20, 1986, Huie died of a heart attack. He left an unfinished novel, The Adversary, which was intended to be the second of a trilogy that began with In the Hours of Night. Martha Huie, his widow and heir, continued to represent her late husband's literary properties. She managed ongoing projects until her death in Memphis in May 2014. Martha Huie's daughter, Mary Ben Heflin, now handles William Bradford Huie's literary properties and ongoing projects.

== Legacy and honors ==
- Alabama Writers Hall of Fame, posthumously inducted 2018
- William Bradford Huie @100, a year-long celebration of Huie's life and works sponsored by The University of Alabama 2010 (In recognition of the 100th anniversary of Huie's birth.)
- Mayor and City Council, City of Tuscaloosa - Memorial Resolution honoring the memory of William Bradford Huie and in recognition of his service in World War II and contributions to the literary world 2010
- The William Bradford Huie Collection established in 2009 at The University of Alabama W.S. Hoole Special Collections Library
- Selected for inclusion in the Southern Literary Trail (2009), a tri-state trail celebrating famous writers of classic southern literature
- Guntersville (Alabama) Museum and Cultural Center added a William Bradford Huie component to its permanent collection
- City of Hartselle, Alabama renamed its public library the "William Bradford Huie Library of Hartselle" 2006
- William Bradford Huie/Alabama Authors Literary Conference sponsored by Snead State Community College, Boaz, AL 2003–2005
- University of Alabama College of Communication and Information Sciences Hall of Fame, inducted in inaugural Hall of Fame class 1998
- "I'm in the Truth Business" University of Alabama Center for Public Television award-winning documentary about Huie first aired on PBS 1996
- The William Bradford Huie Collection established in 1989 at the Ohio State University Rare Books and Manuscripts Library
- University of Alabama Society of Fine Arts: 1987 Alabama Alumni Arts Award
- Alabama School of Fine Arts - Showcase '87 dedicated to William Bradford Huie
- International Arts Council charter member 1982–1986
- Who's Who in American 1944–1986
- Alabama Senior Citizens Hall of Fame 1986
- Golden Eagle Journalism Award 1986
- Sigma Tau Delta, Honor Member, Outstanding Contribution Award 1984
- Alabama Academy of Distinguished Authors, inducted 1983
- Alabama Writers' Conclave Author Award 1980
- Alabama Library Association - Best Fiction Book Award, 1977 for In the Hours of Night
- Edgar Allan Poe Award for Best Fact Crime, 1957 for Ruby McCollum, Woman in the Suwannee Jail
- Phi Beta Kappa - University of Alabama 1930
- Valedictorian - Morgan County High School 1927
- Eagle Scout 1925

William Bradford Huie wrote over 20 books, 14 of which became best sellers.

After Huie's death, his widow Martha Hunt Robertson Huie donated his papers, manuscripts, artifacts, correspondence to the Ohio State University and the University of Alabama Special Collection Libraries.

Since Huie's death in 1986, dozens of publications have cited, quoted, referenced and analyzed his work. Recent examples include: David Halberstam's The Fifties; both volumes of Reporting Civil Rights: American Journalism 1941-1963 and 1963-1973; The Race Beat by Gene Roberts and Hank Klibanoff, 2006; and Devin McKinney's "An American Cuss," in Oxford American, Issue 57, 2007.

== See also ==
- Conservatism

== Bibliography ==
=== Fiction ===
- Mud on the Stars (1942; reprinted with new material 1996, adapted as 1960 film Wild River)
- The Revolt of Mamie Stover (1951, adapted as 1956 film of the same name)
- The Americanization of Emily (1959, adapted as 1964 film of the same name)
- Hotel Mamie Stover (1963)
- The Klansman (1967, adapted as 1974 film of the same name)
- In the Hours of the Night (1975)

=== Nonfiction ===
- The Fight for Air Power (1942)
- Seabee Roads to Victory (1944)
- Can Do!: The Story of the Seabees (1944; reprinted with new material 1997)
- From Omaha to Okinawa: The Story of the Seabees (1945; reprinted with new material 1999)
- The Case against the Admirals: Why We Must Have a Unified Command (1946)
- Ruby McCollum: Woman in the Suwannee Jail (1956)
- The Execution of Private Slovik (1954; reprinted with new material 2004, adapted as 1974 TV film of the same name)
- Wolf Whistle and Other Stories (1959; Wolf Whistle also included in The Outsider and Other Stories 1961)
- The Outsider and Other Stories (1961, adapted as 1961 film The Outsider)
- "The Hero of Iwo Jima and Other Stories" (1962, adapted as 1961 film The Outsider)
- The Hiroshima Pilot: The Case of Major Claude Eatherly (1964)
- Three Lives for Mississippi (1965; reprinted with new material 2000)
- He Slew the Dreamer: My Search with James Earl Ray for the Truth about the Murder of Martin Luther King (1970; reprinted with new material 1997 and 2018)
- "Did the FBI Kill Martin Luther King?" (1977)
- A New Life to Live: Jimmy Putman's Story (1977)
- It's Me O Lord! (1979)
