= Longines Chronoscope =

American TV talk show (1951–1955)

- Also known as: Chronoscope
- Genre: Public affairs
- Created by: Alan Cartoun
- Directed by: Alan Cartoun
- Presented by: Frank Knight; William Bradford Huie; Edward P. Morgan; Larry LeSueur; Henry Hazlitt
- Country of origin: United States
- Original language: English

Production
- Running time: 15 minutes

Original release
- Network: CBS Television
- Release: 11 June 1951 – April 1955

Longines Chronoscope, also titled Chronoscope, is an American TV series, sponsored by Longines watches, that ran on CBS Television from 1951–1955. The series initially aired Monday nights at 11 p.m. ET to 11:15 p.m., and then expanded to Mondays, Wednesdays, and Fridays at 11 p.m. ET after the first season. More than 600 episodes were aired, but only 482 survive, and these surviving kinescopes were donated by Longines to the National Archives.

The series featured 15-minute episodes with interviews with notable people of the time, including Eleanor Roosevelt, John F. Kennedy, Hubert H. Humphrey, Henry Wallace, Robert Moses, Richard E. Byrd, Joseph McCarthy, Earl Warren, Arthur Bliss Lane, John V. Beamer, Tadeusz "Bór" Komorowski and Clare Boothe Luce.

The program was initially moderated by Frank Knight. Journalist Frank W. Taylor and business affairs consultant Henry Hazlitt were regular members of the three-person panel. The third panelist for each episode was a guest selected for having particular knowledge related to the guest for that show. Later moderators include William Bradford Huie, Edward P. Morgan, Larry LeSueur and Henry Hazlitt.

In February 1954, Clark Getts, former producer of Longines Chronoscope, sued CBS for $150,000, alleging that the network had caused Longines to break its contract with him.

The program's demise resulted from a disagreement between CBS and the sponsor regarding control. Network officials felt that CBS should have control, because the program involved discussions of controversial public affairs; Longines executives felt that the company should retain control.

In 1956, Chronoscope was included in a Congressional subcommittee's investigation of network operations. Getts, CBS executives, and a Longines-Wittnauer official were among the witnesses who appeared before the subcommittee headed by Representative Emanuel Celler.

== See also ==
- Television news in the United States
- Public affairs (broadcasting)

== Bibliography ==
- Tim Brooks and Earle Marsh, The Complete Directory to Prime Time Network and Cable TV Shows 1946–Present, Ninth edition (New York: Ballantine Books, 2007) ISBN 978-0-345-49773-4
