= Eddie Slovik =

American soldier (1920–1945)

- Born: Edward Donald Slovik; February 18, 1920; Detroit, Michigan, U.S.
- Died: January 31, 1945 (aged 24); Sainte-Marie-aux-Mines, Grand Est, France
- Status: Executed by firing squad
- Conviction: Desertion
- Penalty: Death
- Military career
- Spouse: Antoinette Wisniewski (m. 1942–1945)
- Allegiance: United States
- Branch: United States Army
- Service years: 1944–1945
- Rank: Private
- Nickname: "Eddie"
- Service number: 36896415
- Units: Company G, 109th Infantry Regiment, 28th Infantry Division
- Conflicts: World War II

Edward Donald Slovik (February 18, 1920 – January 31, 1945) was an American soldier who was court-martialed and executed for desertion during World War II. He is the only US serviceman to have met such a fate since the American Civil War, though in 1902, during the American-Philippine War, two American soldiers (Edmund DuBose and Lewis Russell) of the 9th Cavalry Regiment were executed for "desertion to the enemy". Although over 21,000 American servicemen were given varying sentences for desertion during World War II, including 49 death sentences, Slovik's death sentence was the only one that was carried out. The case was brought to public attention by the 1954 book The Execution of Private Slovik by William Bradford Huie, later made into an NBC 1974 television movie.

== Early life and education ==
Slovik was born in Detroit, Michigan, in 1920 to a Catholic, Polish-American family, the son of Anna Lutsky and Josef Slowikowski. While a minor, he was a troublemaker and had contact with the police frequently. Slovik was first arrested at age 12 when he and some friends broke into a foundry to steal brass. From 1932 to 1937, he was arrested several times for offenses which included petty theft, breaking and entering, and disturbing the peace. In October 1937, he was sent to prison, but was paroled in September 1938. After stealing and crashing a car with two friends while drunk, he was sent back to prison in January 1939.

== Career ==
In April 1942, Slovik was paroled once more. He then obtained a job at Montella Plumbing and Heating in Dearborn, Michigan. While working there, he met the woman who became his wife, Antoinette Wisniewski. She was working as a bookkeeper for Montella Plumbing's owner, James Montella. They married on November 7, 1942, and lived with her parents. Slovik's criminal record classified him as morally unfit for duty in the U.S. military (4-F), but, shortly after the couple's first wedding anniversary, Slovik was reclassified as fit for duty (1-A) and subsequently drafted by the Army on January 3, 1944, from Detroit, Michigan.

Slovik arrived at Camp Wolters, Texas, for basic training on January 24, 1944, and was assigned to Company D of the 59th Infantry Training Battalion on January 31, 1944. On July 11, 1944, he was assigned to Ground Forces Replacement Depot No. 1 at Fort George G. Meade, Maryland. In August, he was dispatched to join the fighting in German-occupied France, and was assigned to the 3rd Replacement Depot. On August 24, he was one of 129 replacements assigned to the 28th Infantry Division. He stayed in the division rear area overnight, before being assigned along with fifteen other men to Company G, 109th Infantry Regiment on August 25, 1944.

=== Desertion ===
While en route to his assigned unit near Elbeuf, France, Slovik and Private John Tankey, a friend he met at Fort Meade, took cover during an artillery attack during the night and became separated from Company G. The company moved on the next morning, inadvertently leaving Slovik and Tankey behind. Slovik and Tankey found a Canadian military police unit that had occupied the town and remained with it for the next six weeks. Tankey wrote to his and Slovik's regiment to explain their absence before the Canadians made arrangements for them to return to duty with their unit on October 7, 1944.

The following day, October 8, Slovik informed his company commander, Captain Ralph Grotte, that he was "too scared" to serve in a front-line rifle company and asked to be reassigned to a unit in a rear area. He then told Grotte that he would run away if he were assigned to a rifle unit, and asked his captain if that would constitute desertion, resulting in a court-martial. Grotte confirmed that it would, refused Slovik's request for reassignment, and sent him to a rifle platoon.

The next day, October 9, Slovik deserted from his unit. Tankey caught up with him and attempted to persuade him to stay, but Slovik's only comment was that his "mind was made up". Slovik walked several miles to the rear and approached an enlisted cook at a military government detachment of the 112th Infantry Regiment, presenting him with a note which stated:

I, Pvt. Eddie D. Slovik, 36896415, confess to the desertion of the United States Army. At the time of my desertion we were in Albuff [sic; "Elbeuf"] in France. I came to Albuff as a replacement. They were shilling [sic; "shelling"] the town and we were told to dig in for the night. The following morning they were shilling us again. I was so scared[,] nerves [sic; "nervous"] and trembling that at the time the other replacements moved out I couldn't move. I stayed their [sic; "there"] in my fox hole till it was quite [sic; "quiet"] and I was able to move. I then walked into town. Not seeing any of our troops so I stayed over night at a French hospital. The next morning I turned myself over to the Canadian Provost Corp [sic; "Corps"]. After being with them six weeks I was turned over to American M.R[.] [sic; "MP" - "military police"] They turned me lose [sic; loose]. I told my commanding officer my story. I said that if I had to go out their [sic; there] again Id [sic; "I'd"] run away. He said there was nothing he could do for me so I ran away again AND I'LL RUN AWAY AGAIN IF I HAVE TO GO OUT THEIR [sic; "THERE"].

— Signed PvI. [sic] Eddie D. Slovik A.S.N. 36896415

The cook took Slovik to a military policeman, then to his company commander, who read the note and urged Slovik to destroy it before he was taken into custody. Slovik refused. He was brought before Lieutenant Colonel Ross Henbest, who again offered him the opportunity to tear up the note, return to his unit, and face no further charges; Slovik again refused. Henbest instructed Slovik to write another note on the back of the first one stating that he fully understood the consequences of deliberately incriminating himself, and that it would be used as evidence against him in a court-martial.

Slovik was taken into custody and confined to the division stockade. The division's judge advocate, Lieutenant Colonel Henry Sommer, offered Slovik a third and final opportunity to rejoin his unit in exchange for the charges against him being dropped. He also offered to transfer Slovik to a different infantry regiment in the division where no one would know of his past and he could start with a "clean slate". Slovik, still convinced that he would face only jail time (which he had already experienced and considered far more tolerable than combat), declined these offers, saying "I've made up my mind. I'll take my court martial."

=== Court-martial ===
The 28th Infantry Division was scheduled to begin an attack in the Hürtgen Forest. The coming attack was common knowledge in the unit, and casualty rates were expected to be high, as the prolonged combat in the area had been unusually grueling. The Germans were determined to hold the terrain, and weather greatly reduced the usual American advantages in armor and air support. A small minority of soldiers (less than 0.5%) indicated they preferred to be imprisoned rather than remain in combat, and the rates of desertion and other crimes had begun to rise.

Slovik was charged with desertion to avoid hazardous duty and tried by court-martial on November 11, 1944. Slovik had to be tried by a court-martial composed of staff officers from other U.S. Army divisions, because all combat officers from the 28th Infantry Division were fighting on the front lines. The prosecutor, Captain John Green, presented witnesses to whom Slovik had stated his intention to "run away". According to his defense counsel, Captain Edward Woods, Slovik had elected not to testify. Woods had mitigating evidence that could have spared Slovik's life: He had served with the Canadians for six weeks and willingly took a rear-echelon job. However, Slovik declined to present it even after being advised of his right to do so by both Woods and the court. In a case similar to Slovik's, another soldier had been sentenced to death and nearly executed. However, at the last moment, General Dwight D. Eisenhower commuted the sentence of this soldier to a prison term since he had presented marginal mitigating evidence.

At the end of the day, the nine officers of the court found Slovik guilty and sentenced him to death. The sentence was reviewed and approved by Major General Norman Cota, the division commander. Cota's stated attitude was, "Given the situation as I knew it in November 1944, I thought it was my duty to this country to approve that sentence. If I hadn't approved it – if I had let Slovik accomplish his purpose – I don't know how I could have gone up to the line and looked a good soldier in the face."

On December 9, Slovik wrote a letter to Supreme Allied Commander Eisenhower pleading for clemency. However, desertion was becoming a systemic problem in France. A surprise German offensive through the Ardennes began on December 16 with severe US casualties. The Battle of the Bulge would last over a month, straining the morale of the infantry to the greatest extent yet seen during the war.

The case was reviewed by assistant staff judge advocate Maj. Frederick J. Bertolet, who recommended against granting clemency. Bertolet wrote:

There can be no doubt he deliberately decided that confinement was preferable to the risks of combat, and that he deliberately sought the comparative comfort of the guardhouse. To him and those soldiers who might follow his example, if he achieves his end, confinement is neither deterrent or punishment. He has directly challenged the authority of the government, and future discipline depends upon a resolute reply to this challenge. If the death penalty is ever to be applied to desertion it should be imposed in this case, not as a punitive measure or retribution, but to maintain that discipline upon which an army can succeed against the enemy. There was no recommendation for clemency in this case and none is here recommended.

Brigadier General E. C. McNeil, the senior Army lawyer in the European Theater, and lawyers on McNeil's staff, reviewed Slovik's case. McNeil wrote:

This is the first death sentence which has reached me for examination. It is probably the first of the kind in the American army for over eighty years – there were none in WWI. In this case the extreme penalty of death appears warranted. This soldier had performed no front line duty. He did not intend to. He deserted from his group of fifteen when about to join the infantry company to which he had been assigned. His subsequent conduct shows a deliberate plan to secure trial and incarceration in a safe place. The sentence adjudged was more severe than he had anticipated, but the imposition of a less severe sentence would only have accomplished the accused's purpose of securing his incarceration and consequent freedom from the dangers which so many of our armed forces are required to face daily. His unfavorable civilian record indicates that he is not a worthy subject of clemency.

Lt. Col. Henry J. Sommer, the division judge advocate who had previously offered Slovik a final opportunity to have his charges dismissed, wrote:

The death sentence is deemed appropriate in this case. The accused is a habitual criminal. He has never seen combat, has run away twice when he believed himself approaching it and avows his intent to run again if he has "to go out there".

Eisenhower confirmed the execution order on December 23, noting that it was necessary to discourage further desertions. The sentence came as a shock to Slovik, who had been expecting a dishonorable discharge and a prison term, the same punishment he had seen given to other deserters from the division while he was confined to the stockade. As he was an ex-convict, a dishonorable discharge would have made little impact on his civilian life as a common laborer, and military prison terms for discipline offenses were widely expected to be commuted once the war was over.

== Execution ==
The execution by firing squad was carried out at 10:04 a.m. on January 31, 1945, near the village of Sainte-Marie-aux-Mines. The defiant Slovik said to the soldiers whose duty it was to prepare him for the firing squad before they led him to the place of execution:

They're not shooting me for deserting the United States Army, thousands of guys have done that. They just need to make an example out of somebody and I'm it because I'm an ex-con. I used to steal things when I was a kid, and that's what they are shooting me for. They're shooting me for the bread and chewing gum I stole when I was 12 years old.

As required by military custom, Slovik's uniform was stripped of all identifying military insignia, buttons, and any other accoutrements. He was wrapped with a GI blanket over his shoulders to protect him against the cold, and led into the courtyard of a house chosen for the execution because of its high masonry wall, which would deflect errant bullets and discourage the local French civilians from witnessing the proceedings. Soldiers stood him against a six-by-six-inch (15 by 15 cm) post. He was then strapped to the post with web belts, with one wrapped around and under his arms and hung on a spike on the back side of the post to prevent his body from slumping following the volley, and the others securing his waist and knees. Just before a soldier placed a black hood over his head, the attending chaplain, Father Carl Patrick Cummings, said to Slovik, "Eddie, when you get up there, say a little prayer for me." Slovik replied with his last words: "Okay, Father. I'll pray that you don't follow me too soon."

The firing squad consisted of 12 soldiers selected from the 109th Regiment. The weapons used were standard-issue M1 Garand rifles, 11 of them loaded with just one round and one rifle loaded with a blank round. On the command of "Fire", Slovik was hit by eleven bullets, at least four of them being fatal. The wounds ranged from high in the neck region out to the left shoulder, over the left chest, and under the heart. One bullet was in the left upper arm. An Army physician quickly determined Slovik had not been immediately killed. As the firing squad's rifles were being reloaded to fire another volley, Slovik died. He was 24 years old. The entire execution took 15 minutes.

== Burial ==
Slovik was buried in Plot E of Oise-Aisne American Cemetery and Memorial in Fère-en-Tardenois, alongside 95 American soldiers executed for rape or murder. Their grave markers are hidden from view by shrubbery and bear sequential numbers instead of names, making it impossible to identify them individually without knowing the key. Antoinette Slovik petitioned the Army for her husband's remains and his pension until her death in 1979.

Slovik's case was taken in 1981 by former Macomb County Commissioner Bernard V. Calka, a Polish-American and veteran of World War II, who continued to petition the Army to return Slovik's remains to the United States. In 1987, he persuaded President Ronald Reagan to order their return. In 1987, Calka raised $5,000 to pay for the exhumation of Slovik's remains from Row 3, Grave 65 of Plot E, and their transfer to Detroit's Woodmere Cemetery, where Slovik was reburied next to his wife. Slovik's military service record is archived and publicly available from the Military Personnel Records Center.

Antoinette Slovik and others petitioned seven U.S. presidents (Harry S. Truman, Dwight D. Eisenhower, John F. Kennedy, Lyndon B. Johnson, Richard Nixon, Gerald Ford, and Jimmy Carter) for a pardon, but none was granted.

== Analysis ==
During World War II, 1.7 million courts-martial were held. In comparison, nearly three times as many criminal cases were tried in the United States during the same period. Most of the cases were minor, as were the sentences. Nevertheless, a clemency board, appointed by Secretary of War Henry L. Stimson in the summer of 1945, reviewed all general courts-martial where the accused was still in confinement, and remitted or reduced the sentence in 85 percent of the 27,000 serious cases reviewed. The death penalty was rarely imposed, and usually only for cases involving rape or murder. Slovik was the only soldier executed who had been convicted of a "purely military" offense.

In militaries around the world, courts-martial have imposed death sentences for offenses such as cowardice, desertion, insubordination, and mutiny. In France during World War I, from 1917 to 1918, the United States Army executed 35 of its own soldiers, but all were convicted of rape or unprovoked murder of civilians and not for military offenses. During World War II, in all theaters of the war, the United States military executed 102 of its own soldiers for rape and/or murder of fellow soldiers and civilians, but only Slovik was executed for the military offense of desertion.

== In popular culture ==
In 1954, William Bradford Huie published a non-fiction account of the case titled The Execution of Private Slovik.

In 1960, Frank Sinatra announced his plan to produce a movie based on the book, with the same title, to be written by screenwriter Albert Maltz. This announcement provoked great outrage, in part because Maltz was part of the blacklisted Hollywood 10, and Sinatra was accused of being a Communist sympathizer. As Sinatra was campaigning for John F. Kennedy for president at the time, the Kennedy camp became concerned, and persuaded Sinatra to cancel the project.

Hans Magnus Enzensberger wrote an essay about Slovik and his death, included in the 1964 book Dreamers of the Absolute (German: Politik und Verbrechen).

In 1968, psychedelic folk rock group Pearls Before Swine dedicated their second album Balaklava "to Pvt. Edward D. Slovik, U.S. Army, deceased".

In 1974, Huie's book was adapted by Lamont Johnson into a TV movie, also titled The Execution of Private Slovik, which starred Martin Sheen.

The 1963 war film The Victors includes a scene featuring the execution of a deserter that closely resembles Slovik's desertion and execution.

Kurt Vonnegut mentions Slovik's execution in his 1969 novel Slaughterhouse-Five. Vonnegut also wrote a companion (alternate) libretto to Igor Stravinsky's L'Histoire du soldat (A Soldier's Tale), telling Slovik's story.

== See also ==
- Capital punishment by the United States military
- History of the Polish Americans in Metro Detroit
- Harold Pringle, the only Canadian soldier executed during World War II
