= The Revolt of Mamie Stover (film) =

1956 film by Raoul Walsh

- Theatrical release poster
- Directed by: Raoul Walsh
- Screenplay by: Sydney Boehm
- Based on: The Revolt of Mamie Stover by William Bradford Huie
- Produced by: Buddy Adler
- Starring: Jane Russell; Richard Egan; Joan Leslie; Agnes Moorehead
- Cinematography: Leo Tover
- Edited by: Louis R. Loeffler
- Music by: Hugo Friedhofer
- Production company: 20th Century-Fox
- Distributed by: 20th Century-Fox
- Release date: May 11, 1956
- Running time: 92 minutes
- Country: United States
- Language: English
- Budget: $2 million
- Box office: $5.7 million (US) $2 million (European)

The Revolt of Mamie Stover is a 1956 American romantic drama film directed by Raoul Walsh and produced by Buddy Adler from a screenplay by Sydney Boehm, based on the 1951 novel of the same name by William Bradford Huie. It stars Jane Russell and Richard Egan, with Joan Leslie, Agnes Moorehead, and Michael Pate, and was filmed in CinemaScope. The music was by Hugo Friedhofer and the cinematography by Leo Tover, with costume design by Travilla. This adaptation downplays the novel's critique of Hollywood and the film industry.

== Plot ==
In 1941, prostitute Mamie Stover is pressured to leave San Francisco by the police. On a freighter bound for Honolulu, she meets Jim Blair, a successful writer and the only other passenger. Initially hostile, Mamie softens a bit when he starts using her life story for material for his writing. A shipboard romance develops; Jim offers to help Mamie make something of herself, but within limits. When they dock in Honolulu, Mamie sees why when Jim is welcomed ashore by his sweetheart Annalee.

As they part, Jim lends Mamie $100 ($2,200 today) to help her get settled. She visits an old friend, Jackie Davis, who introduces her to Bertha Parchman, the mean-spirited owner of a dance hall and bar. Even more cold-hearted is Bertha's vicious manager Harry Adkins, who beats any rule-breaking hostesses working at the club. Mamie gets hired and learns Bertha's four rules: She must live on the premises (so Bertha can keep an eye on her employee), have no boyfriend, do not visit Waikiki Beach or the fancy hotels, and have no bank account in order to avoid attracting the attention of the tax people. The hostesses can keep 30% of the revenue they generate selling tickets for dancing, private visits, and overpriced bottles of watered-down liquor.

Mamie soon becomes the main attraction of the club, acquiring the nickname Flaming Mamie (after dying her hair red). She quickly builds a $2,200 ($48,200 today) bankroll—enough money to pay back her debt to Jim, so she invites him to the club. She is disappointed by Jim's disapproval and rejects his suggestion to return to the mainland. She manages to convince him to rekindle their friendship which puts a strain on his relationship with Annalee, who is jealous of the amount of attention that Jim is giving Mamie. In the meantime, she persuades Jim to manage her money and write a check to her father on her behalf. Seeing a response from the father addressed to Mrs. Jim Blair upsets Jim, but he reluctantly agrees to go along. He defends Mamie when Harry beats her up for going out with him.

The bombing of Pearl Harbor causes Jim to abandon Annalee and to frantically search for Mamie. He enlists and asks Mamie to marry him once the war ends. The war builds Mamie's personal fortune. She spends many thousands of dollars purchasing multiple commercial properties cheaply from owners wanting to return to the mainland, soon renting them to the U.S. military. While on leave, Jim convinces Mamie to leave the dance hall. Returning to the club to announce her resignation, Mamie finds out that Harry has been fired for encounters with the military police. Bertha, fearing the loss of the club's biggest attraction, promises to let Mamie jump to a 50% commission at the now booming club, as well as a respectable mailing address to deceive Jim when writing him at his overseas postings. By the time of the 1942 Battle of Midway, Mamie is earning $4,000 ($78,800 today) monthly on her property rentals, and Bertha has boosted her to a 70% commission.

Misleading Jim does not work, though, as a promotional poster of Mamie has become a popular pin-up with the troops. He is wounded and returns to Hawaii on convalescent leave, where he confronts Mamie. After a subdued argument, Jim concludes that their lives are too different and leaves her for good. A heartbroken Mamie leaves Hawaii. She disembarks in San Francisco, met by a police officer who reminds her she is still banned from the city. She tells him that she made a fortune and gave it away. He doesn't believe her, but offers a ride to the airport to catch a flight to her hometown in Mississippi.

== Cast ==
- Jane Russell as Mamie Stover
- Richard Egan as Jim Blair
- Joan Leslie as Annalee Johnson
- Agnes Moorehead as Bertha Parchman
- Jorja Curtright as Jackie Davis
- Michael Pate as Harry Adkins
- Richard Coogan as Capt. Eldon Sumac
- Alan Reed as Capt. Gorecki
- Eddie Firestone as Tarzan
- Jean Willes as Gladys
- Leon Lontoc as Aki
- Kathy Marlowe as Zelda
- Margia Dean as Peaches
- Jack Mather as Bartender
- John Halloran as Henry - Club Bouncer
- Sally Todd as Dance Hall Hostess
- Richard Collier as Photographer

== Production ==
In May 1955, it was reported that 20th Century Fox had bought the rights to Huie's novel of the same name.

The role of Mamie Stover originally was intended for Marilyn Monroe, but Marilyn was on "strike" with Fox over contact negotiations and was turning down many roles offered to her. The role eventually was offered to Jane Russell, whose confirmation was reported in November 1955. However, in the September 16, 1955 edition of The Southeast Missourian, Hollywood gossip columnist Erskine Johnson reported "Jane Russell has a date at Fox to discuss the possibility of starring in The Revolt of Mamie Stover. The paperback version sold 3,000,000 copies but there will have to be 3,000 censorship cuts if Mamie ever reaches the screen."

Other articles mentioned Rita Hayworth & Susan Hayward as contenders for the role of Mamie as well as Lana Turner but an extended vacation prohibited her from taking the part. Joan Leslie was assigned to co-star in December.

An expository opening scene was filmed but deleted for censorship reasons: On a street corner in San Francisco, Mamie is picked up by Howard Sloan, a middle-aged man portrayed by Stubby Kaye, and then detained by police who suggest she get out of town. One of the police officers is portrayed by Hugh Beaumont who can be seen briefly in the finished film at the beginning before the credits roll and at the very end when Mamie returns to San Francisco.

In the novel, Mamie Stover was described as a blonde, resembling actress Lizabeth Scott. However, producer Buddy Adler believed audiences would be thrown if Russell, one of the more famous brunettes in Hollywood, went blonde so he had Jane become a redhead. Russell wore a long red wig, but dyed her short natural black hair red along with her eyebrows.

Filming took place partially on location in Honolulu. The remainder of the scenes were shot on the lot of Fox. The film was Joan Leslie's final film appearance before retiring from the screen.

== Box office ==
In its list of the 100 top box-office hits of 1956, Variety Weekly (January 2, 1957 issue) ranked The Revolt of Mamie Stover at #44 for the year in box office rentals earning $2 million, most assuredly earning more in ticket sales. The June 18, 1956 issue of Time reported the film at #3 as one of "the most popular and successful movies in the U.S. last month, according to the tradesheet Variety" coming in behind Alfred Hitchcock's The Man Who Knew Too Much and The Man in the Gray Flannel Suit.

Hollywood gossip columnist Hedda Hopper wrote in her May 17, 1956 column: "Since the success of 'Mamie Stover,' Buddy Adler has signed Raoul Walsh to three more pictures at 20th Century Fox, and is trying to buy one of Jane Russell's commitments from Howard Hughes so he can star Jane in a romantic musical." Raoul Walsh's next three pictures for 20th Century Fox were The Sheriff of Fractured Jaw (1958); A Private's Affair (1959) and Esther and the King (1960). He made one more film for Fox, Marines, Let's Go released in 1961. Apparently Adler wasn't able to secure a deal with Hughes for Russell's services. Jane wouldn't appear in a Fox film until 1964's Fate Is the Hunter, and her role was a cameo appearing as herself.

Marilyn Ann Moss in her biography titled Raoul Walsh: The True Adventures of Hollywood's Legendary Director wrote: "Mamie Stover enjoyed good box office and afterward built a large international following."

== Critical response ==
Upon its initial release, The Revolt of Mamie Stover received mostly poor reviews. Criticism focused on the film's sanitizing of the novel's original content. The headline of the Los Angeles Times review on the May 7, 1956 stated: "Mamie Stover's Revolt Suppressed by Censors". Bosley Crowther of the New York Times wrote a scathing review and made reference to the film's ad campaign which asked "Why Did Mamie Leave San Francisco?" His opening line of the review: "If you must know why Mamie Stover had to leave San Francisco, you'll have to ask someone other than this reviewer, who did not get the answer from the film..."

Gossip columnist Walter Winchell tried to soften the critical blows with a blurb in his syndicated column: "The Revolt of Mamie Stover, considerably laundered from the book, is a more entertaining movie than the reviews indicated. Richard Egan is a refreshing actor. Jane Russell and Agnes Moorehead are the other reasons it romps along." Photoplay in its review gave it three out of four stars and wrote "Jane Russell does a spirited job in a story that has both corny and realistic aspects" concluding, "A couple of gay songs enliven the unsavory proceedings."

Contemporary critics reappraised the film as a whole, its director and as well as Jane Russell's performance.

Italian film historian Ermanno Comuzio wrote in 1982 "The story of this 'rebellious woman' is 'explosive.' Jane Russell perfectly incarnates an unusual female character with her fighter’s broad shoulders. She is the female equivalent of the implacable and conquering hero who wants to take the world in her fist...The Revolt of Mamie Stover is an unconventional film, typical of Walsh’s last period, when he had even less patience with red tape and was more explicit in his speech, more focused on his filming, as well as the dismantling of the internal mechanisms of the more typical and standardised Hollywood filmmaking, and so of his own cinema."

Filmmaker Peter Bogdanovich wrote in 1965: "Very good...fascinating, ambiguously told story of a tough, flamboyant prostitute, her expulsion from San Francisco, her affair with a 'respectable' writer, her rise to wealth on the war in Hawaii. Very cleverly written and played to avoid the censors, but clear in its meanings and in Mamie’s lack of regeneration. Perfectly cast with Jane Russell, Richard Egan, directed with typical Walshian vigor and spirit; an amusing and devastating character study, with Russell staring at camera in the beginning (as opposed to the end as in Bergman’s Monika), defying the viewer to judge her."

Gary Tooze writing a review of the Blu-ray release of the film for DVDBeaver website "The Revolt of Mamie Stover has adult themes, female empowerment, war and romance. It offers an impressive, tough girl, performance from Russell. I love the film's exotic look, extravagant costumes and mixed genres."

== Home media ==
The Revolt of Mamie Stover was released in movie theaters in May 1956. It wasn't until July 17, 2018, that the film received its first U.S. home video release. The boutique video company Twilight Time released a limited-edition (3,000 units) blu-ray disc of a 4k restoration, which has renewed interested in the film.

== Soundtrack ==
In May 1956 RCA-Victor RCA Records released The Ames Brothers recording of the film's song "If You Wanna See Mamie Tonight" by Paul Francis Webster and Sammy Fain as the b-side to "It Only Hurts for a Little While". The song peaked at #89 on the Billboard Charts. Also in May 1956 Capitol Records released a single of the film's two songs "Keep Your Eyes on the Hands" by Tony Tordaro and Mary Johnston and "If You Wanna See Mamie Tonight" with Jane Russell performing the vocals backed by the Nelson Riddle Orchestra.

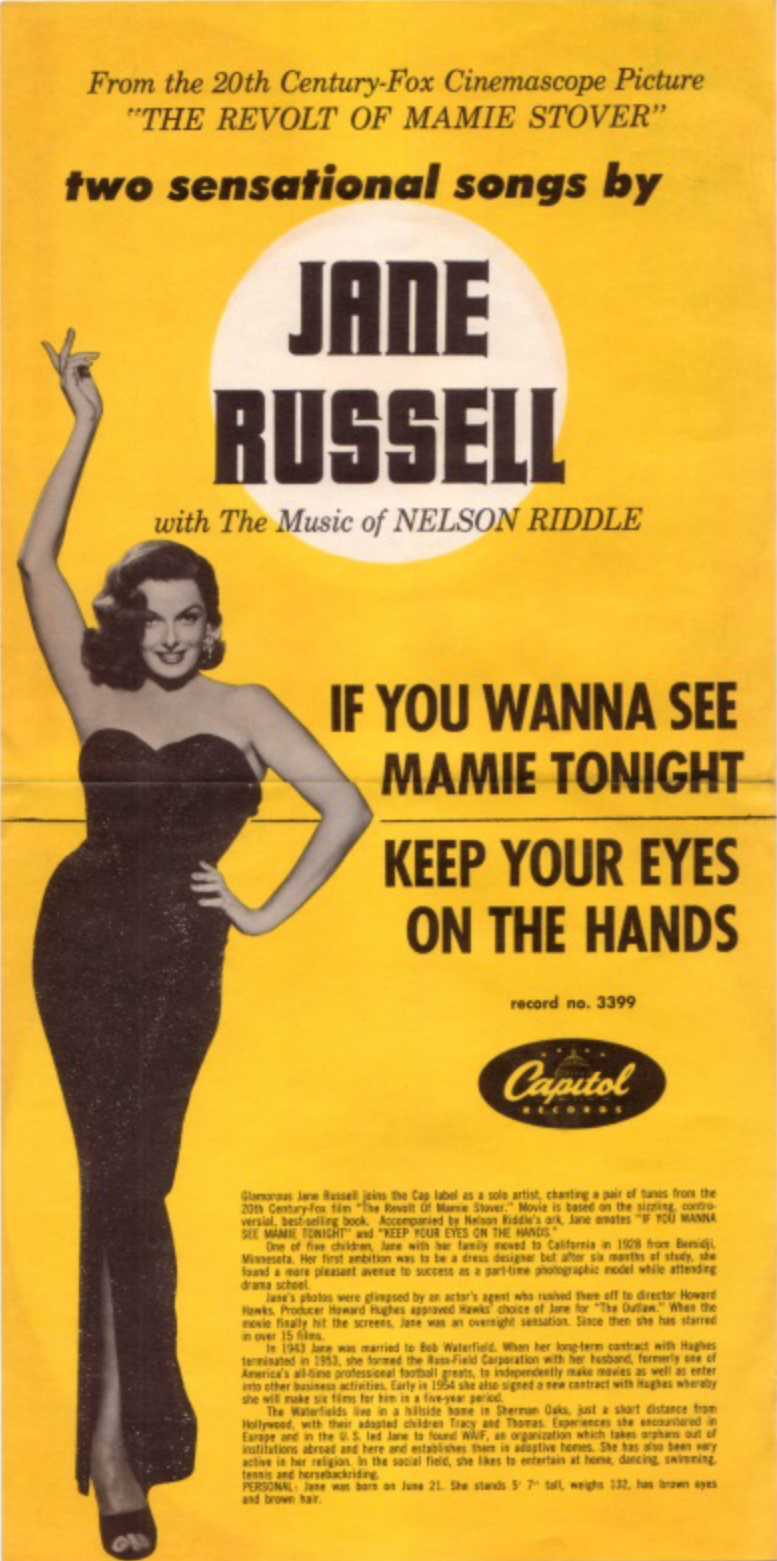

In 2006, the Intrada Records, an independent label, released a CD of Hugo Friedhofer's soundtrack of The Revolt of Mamie Stover along with David Raksin's soundtrack for Hilda Crane, another 20th Century Fox film also from 1956. This CD is no longer in print.

== See also ==
- List of American films of 1956
