= The Outsider (1961 film) =

1961 biopic film directed by Delbert Mann

- Australian film poster
- Directed by: Delbert Mann
- Screenplay by: Stewart Stern
- Based on: The Hero of Iwo Jima by William Bradford Huie
- Produced by: Sy Bartlett
- Starring: Tony Curtis
- Cinematography: Joseph LaShelle, A.S.C.
- Edited by: Marjorie Fowler, A.C.E.
- Music by: Leonard Rosenman (composed and conducted)
- Distributed by: Universal-International
- Release date: December 1961
- Running time: 108 minutes
- Country: United States
- Language: English

The Outsider is a 1961 biopic film about Ira Hayes, a Native American who fought in World War II in the United States Marine Corps and was one of the Marines who raised the flag on Iwo Jima. The film stars Tony Curtis as Hayes. It was directed by Delbert Mann.

Jim Sorenson, a Marine depicted as Hayes's best friend is a fictional composite of Franklin Sousley and Harlon Block, who raised the flag. The movie was adapted from an article by William Bradford Huie about Hayes.

== Plot ==
Seventeen year-old Ira Hamilton Hayes has never been off the Pima reservation in Arizona until he enlists in the United States Marine Corps.

Hayes is shunned and mocked by his fellow Marines, except for Jim Sorenson. By chance, Hayes and Sorenson are two of the six U.S. servicemen who hoist the U.S. flag on Mount Suribachi during the battle at Iwo Jima. A photograph of them becomes an iconic image of the war, serving as the basis for a memorial that is installed in Arlington, Virginia. After this action, Sorenson is killed by enemy fire.

A morose and traumatized Hayes returns home, where he is proclaimed a hero and recruited to help sell war bonds to the public. As his depression mounts, Hayes, feeling unworthy of the attention and publicity, takes refuge in whiskey.

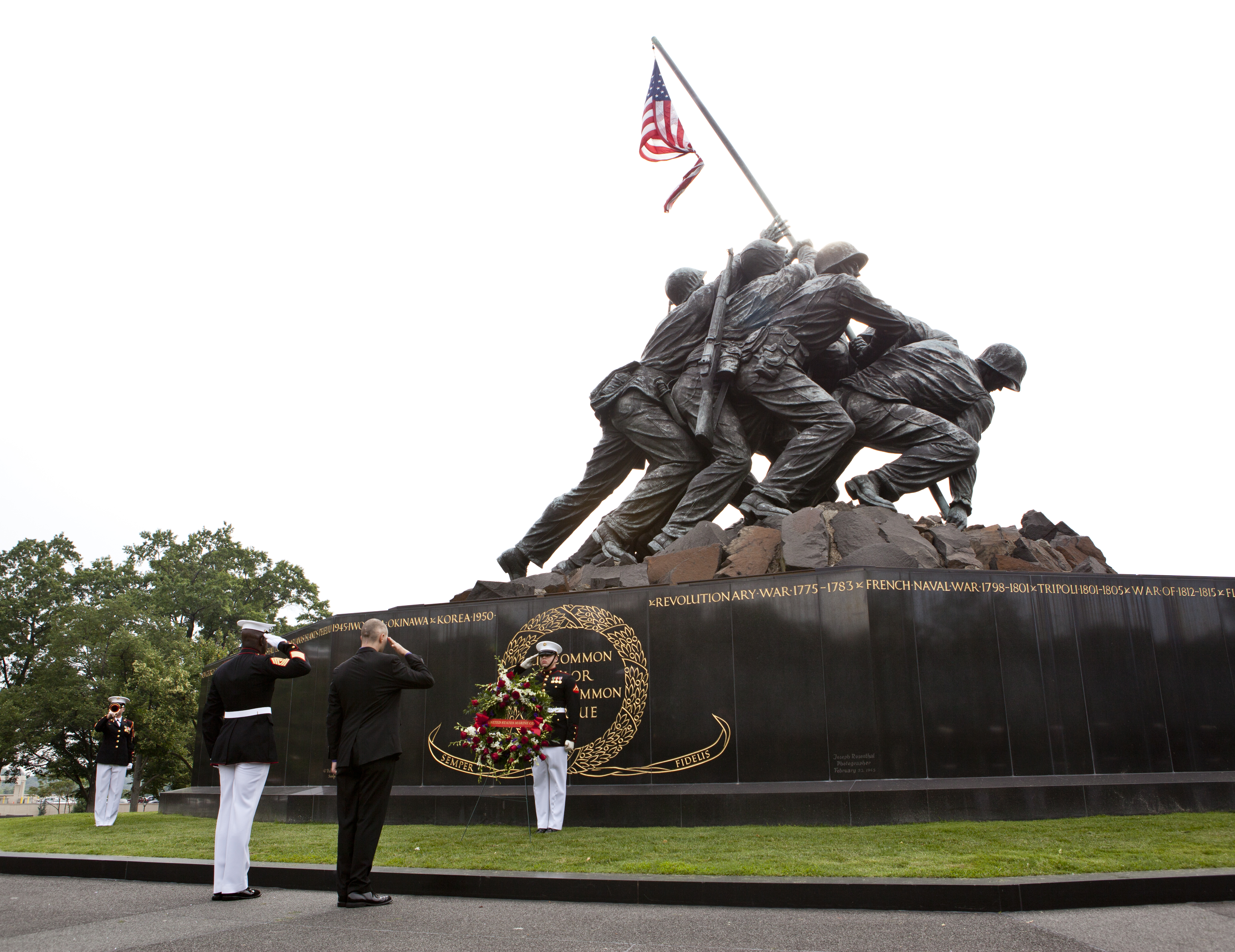
Marine Corps War Memorial

Hayes' alcoholism after he leaves the Marine Corps becomes a public scandal. Hayes wishes to be left alone, but a tribal chief urges him to go to Washington, D.C. on his people's behalf to seek political support for an irrigation bill. Not until he attends the dedication of the Marine Corps War Memorial (also called the Iwo Jima Memorial) in Arlington, Virginia on November 10, 1954, does he decide to pull himself together.

Hayes returns to the reservation, but is deeply disappointed when the tribal council no longer seems to want anything to do with him. A drunk Hayes goes off into the hills, where he dies of exposure to the elements at the age of 32, ten years after the Iwo Jima battle.

Epilogue: Ira Hayes was buried with full military honors at Arlington National Cemetery on February 2, 1955.

== Cast ==
- Tony Curtis as Ira Hayes
- James Franciscus as Jim Sorenson
- Gregory Walcott as Sergeant Kiley
- Bruce Bennett as Major General Bridges
- Vivian Nathan as Nancy Hayes
- Edmund Hashim as Jay Morago
- Paul Comi as Sergeant Boyle
- Stanley Adams as Noomie
- Wayne Heffley as Corporal Johnson
- Ralph Moody as Uncle
- Jeff Silver as McGruder
- Lynda Day George as Kim
- James Beck as Tyler
- Forrest Compton as Bradley
- Peter Homer Sr. as Mr. Alvarez
- Mary Patton as Chairlady

== Production ==
The movie was filmed on location at the Gila River Indian Reservation in Arizona, Marine Corps Recruit Depot San Diego, Camp Calvin B. Matthews in California, Soldier Field in Chicago, San Diego, the Marine Corps War Memorial at Arlington, Virginia, Arlington National Cemetery, and Universal Studios in California.

== Historical Inaccuracies ==
Ira Hayes was not 17 when he enlisted. He was 19, having been born on January 12, 1923, and having enlisted on August 26, 1942, and would not have needed parental permission.

== See also ==
- List of American films of 1961
- List of war films and TV specials
- Whitewashing in film
