= The Americanization of Emily =

1964 black comedy war film written by Paddy Chayefsky and directed by Arthur Hiller

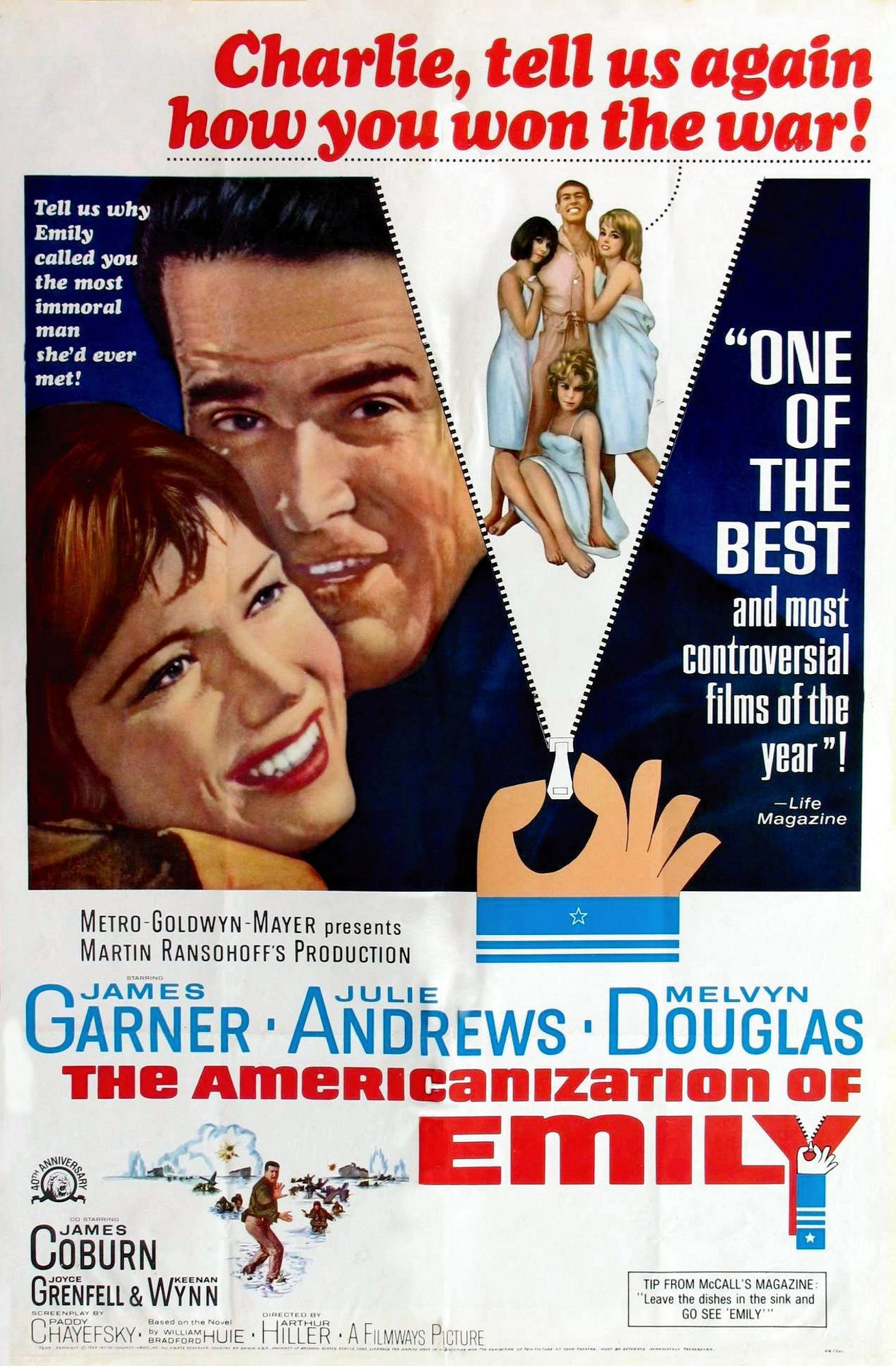
- Theatrical release poster by Reynold Brown
- Directed by: Arthur Hiller
- Screenplay by: Paddy Chayefsky
- Based on: The Americanization of Emily; 1959 novel by William Bradford Huie
- Produced by: Martin Ransohoff
- Starring: James Garner; Julie Andrews; Melvyn Douglas
- Cinematography: Philip H. Lathrop
- Edited by: Tom McAdoo
- Music by: Johnny Mandel
- Production company: Filmways
- Distributed by: Metro-Goldwyn-Mayer
- Release dates: October 27, 1964 (US); April 15, 1965 (UK)
- Running time: 115 minutes
- Country: United States
- Language: English
- Budget: $2.7 million
- Box office: $4,000,000 (rentals)

The Americanization of Emily is a 1964 American black-and-white black comedy anti-war film directed by Arthur Hiller, written by Paddy Chayefsky, and starring James Garner, Julie Andrews, Melvyn Douglas, James Coburn, Joyce Grenfell, and Keenan Wynn. Set during World War II, the film follows a United States Navy adjutant who is roped into a reckless interservice rivalry-fueled stunt by his superiors.

Chayefsky's screenplay was loosely adapted from the 1959 novel of the same name by William Bradford Huie, who had been a Seabee officer during Operation Overlord. Controversial for its stance during the dawn of the Vietnam War, the film has since been praised as a "vanguard anti-war film". Both James Garner and Julie Andrews have considered the film to be the favorite of their films.

== Plot ==
U.S. Navy Lieutenant Commander Charlie Madison is a cynical and highly efficient adjutant or "dog robber" to Rear Admiral William Jessup in London during World War II. Charlie keeps his boss supplied with everything that he might desire, including luxury goods and amiable women. He falls in love with Emily Barham, a British ATS driver who has lost her husband, brother and father to the war. Charlie's pleasure-seeking "American" lifestyle amid wartime rationing both fascinates and disgusts Emily who does not want to be "Americanized." Charlie tries to convince her of the virtue of cowardice, believing moral striving to be the cause of needless war and death. She doesn't want to lose another loved one to the war and finds the "practicing coward" Charlie irresistible.

Despondent since the death of his wife, Jessup decides that "the first dead man on Omaha Beach must be a sailor" so that the U.S. Army won't overshadow the Navy in the forthcoming D-Day invasion. He orders Charlie to create a combat film to document the death, promising the casualty will be buried in a "Tomb of the Unknown Sailor".

Despite his best efforts to avoid the assignment, Charlie and his gung-ho friend, Commander Cummings, become a makeshift two-man film crew aboard a ship with the combat engineers, who will be the first sailors ashore on D-Day. Charlie tries to run away once ashore, but Cummings shoots him in the leg. A German shell lands near Charlie, making him the first American casualty on Omaha Beach. Hundreds of newspapers and magazine covers reprint a photograph of Charlie running on the beach alone, making him a war hero. Having recovered from his breakdown, Jessup is horrified by his part in Charlie's death, but plans to use it politically in support of the Navy's upcoming appropriations debate in the U.S. Senate. Emily is devastated to have lost another person she loves to the war.

Charlie turns up alive at the Allied 6th Relocation Center in Southampton, England. Relieved, Jessup plans to show him off during testimony to the Senate as the "first man on Omaha Beach", a sailor. Limping from his injury and angry about his senseless near-death, Charlie plans to act nobly by telling the world the truth, even if it means imprisonment for cowardice. However, Emily persuades Charlie to choose happiness with her instead by keeping quiet and accept his new, unwanted role as a hero.

== Cast ==
- James Garner as Lt. Cmdr. Charles "Charlie" E. Madison
- Julie Andrews as Emily Barham
- Melvyn Douglas as Admiral William Jessup
- Paul Newlan as Gen. William Hallerton
- James Coburn as Lt. Cmdr. Paul "Bus" Cummings
- Joyce Grenfell as Mrs. Barham
- Keenan Wynn as old sailor
- Edward Binns as Admiral Thomas Healy
- Liz Fraser as Sheila
- William Windom as Captain Harry Spaulding
- John Crawford as Chief Petty Officer Paul Adams
- Douglas Henderson as Captain Marvin Ellender
- Edmon Ryan as Admiral Hoyle
- Steve Franken as young sailor
- Alan Sues as Petty Officer Enright
- Judy Carne as "2nd nameless broad"
- Sharon Tate as "beautiful girl" (uncredited)
- Red West as soldier (uncredited)

== Production ==
=== Casting ===
According to James Garner, William Holden was meant to play the lead role of Charlie Madison, with Garner to play Bus Cummings. When Holden withdrew, Garner took the lead role, and James Coburn was brought in to play Bus. Lee Marvin is mentioned as starring in the movie instead of Coburn in Metro-Goldwyn-Mayer's promotional film MGM Is on the Move! (1964).

=== Soundtrack ===
The film introduced the song "Emily", composed by Johnny Mandel with lyrics by Johnny Mercer. Though an instrumental version is heard, and Mercer gets an-onscreen credit for the lyrics, a vocal version is not performed at any time during the film. The vocal version was recorded by Frank Sinatra with Nelson Riddle arranging and conducting on October 3, 1964 and included on the Reprise LP Softly, as I Leave You. It later was recorded by Jack Jones for Dear Heart (1965) and by Barbra Streisand for The Movie Album (2003).

=== Fashion ===
The women's hairstyles, dress fashions, makeup, and shoes seen in the film have been criticized for being appropriate for 1964, not 1944.

=== Filming ===
The hotel suite party scene was filmed on November 22, 1963, the same day as President John F. Kennedy's assassination.

== Comparison with the novel ==
Cover of the novel

The Americanization of Emily is based on William Bradford Huie's 1959 novel of the same name. The New York Times ran a brief news item mentioning Huie's novel prior to its publication, but never reviewed it, although in 1963 Paddy Chayefsky's development of the novel into a screenplay was found worthy of note. A first draft of the film's screenplay was written by George Goodman, who previously had a success at MGM with The Wheeler Dealers (1963), also with James Garner as the male lead and with the same director and producer. In 1964, a Broadway musical with music written by John Barry was announced. Chayefsky's adaptation, while retaining the title, characters, situation, background and many specific plot incidents, told a very different story. He said, "I found the book, which is serious in tone, essentially a funny satire, and that's how I'm treating it."

== 1967 re-release and renaming ==
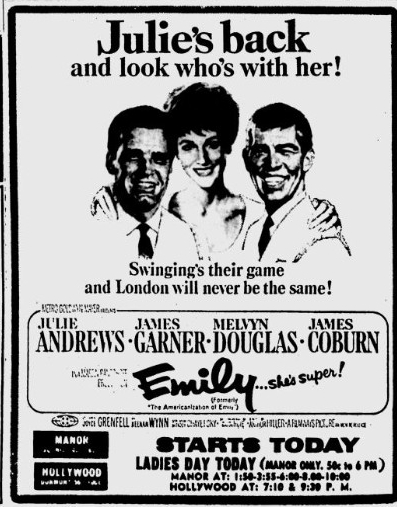
Newspaper ad copy and artwork for retitle, from Pittsburgh Post-Gazette, September 27, 1967

The film's 1967 rerelease hoped to benefit from the popularity of its stars; it was billed by MGM simply as "Emily." A Metro spokesman explained that "in no way are we trying to delude the public. We felt all along that the original title—the title of the book by William Bradford Hule—was heavy and did not relate as much to the film and to Julie Andrews, who is the film's main attraction now, as 'Emily' does. We simply think that we can do more business with the new title than with the old one."

== Reception ==
=== Critical reception ===
In a contemporary review for The New York Times, critic Bosley Crowther praised Chayefsky's screenplay as including "some remarkably good writing with some slashing irreverence".

The New York Daily News believed the film's satire "denigrates the Navy to the point of making it ridiculous and venal", that the Chayefsky dialogue was "more often a dissertation than the give and take of ordinary conversation", and that many of the picture's scenes were "in shockingly bad taste". Writing for the New York Herald Tribune, Judith Crist found the film to be an "almost" movie: "it almost gets where it thinks it's going before it changes its mind and gets nowhere....and that's a pity, because it has a lot going for it."

The Americanization of Emily has a 93% rating on Rotten Tomatoes, based on 14 reviews, with an average rating of 7.39/10. Metacritic, which uses a weighted average, assigned the film a score of 68 out of 100, based on 9 critics, indicating "generally favorable" reviews. In Slant, Nick Schager wrote "Though a bit overstuffed with long-winded speeches, Chayefsky's scabrously funny script brims with snappy, crackling dialogue." In A Journey Through American Literature, academic Kevin J. Hayes praised Chayefsky's speeches for Garner as "stirring".

=== Awards and honors ===
The film was nominated for Academy Awards in 1965 for Best Art Direction and Best Cinematography, and in 1966 Julie Andrews' portrayal of Emily earned her a nomination for a BAFTA Award for Best British Actress.

The Americanization of Emily was among the films selected for The New York Times Guide to the Best 1,000 Movies Ever Made.

== Home media ==
The Americanization of Emily was released on Blu-ray by Warner Home Video on March 11, 2014 via its on-demand Warner Archive Collection.

== See also ==
- List of American films of 1964
- List of anti-war films
