= Harold Pringle =

Canadian Army soldier

- Born: 14 January 1920; Flinton, Ontario, Canada
- Died: 5 July 1945 (aged 25); Italy
- Resting place: Caserta, Italy
- Status: Executed by firing squad
- Convictions: Murder; Assault; Absence without leave
- Penalty: Death
- Military career
- Allegiance: Canada
- Branch: Royal Canadian Infantry Corps
- Service years: 1940–1945
- Rank: Private
- Service number: C/5292
- Units: 1st Battalion, Hastings and Prince Edward Regiment
- Conflicts: World War II

Harold Joseph Pringle (14 January 1920 – 5 July 1945) was the only soldier of the Canadian Army to be executed during the Second World War.

== Biography ==
Pringle was born in the small hamlet of Flinton, Ontario, near Napanee. He and his father tried to enlist in The Hastings and Prince Edward Regiment of the Canadian Army. On medical examination, he was accepted, but his father was turned away due to poor eyesight. Pringle was formally enrolled in the army in February 1940, aged 20.

Pringle was a disciplinary problem for his unit, going AWOL many times, and he was sent to a reformatory camp for a year. He escaped after serving six months there and was sent to Italy where he was posted to the 1st Battalion, The Hastings and Prince Edward Regiment, as a private with the service number C/5292. Pringle's combat record after the escape was unblemished until after the battle for the Hitler Line in central Italy, when he deserted to Rome to join the Sailor Gang.

The Sailor Gang, though only five members strong, was similar to the larger and better organized Lane Gang—both gangs were made up of military deserters who smuggled goods into Rome for the black market. The members of the Sailor Gang lived pleasantly for many months, before their situation deteriorated. They were almost always drunk, got into fights, and made rash decisions, to the point where one of their members shot another. They tried to take him to the local field hospital, and all of his gang (except one who was given immunity for his testimony at their trials) alleged that he died on the way, claiming also that Pringle and the gang leader shot the man several times after he had already died so it would look like a Mafia killing. The identity of the dead gang member, a Canadian soldier named John (Lucky) McGillivary, was discovered. Police later apprehended almost all the members of the Sailor Gang, along with the members of the similar, but larger, Lane Gang.

The various gang members were tried; Pringle was sentenced to death for murder. An appeal against the decision was rejected. On 5 July 1945, Pringle was executed by a Canadian Army firing squad. He was buried in grave number 11, row B, plot VII at Caserta CWGC Cemetery in Italy.

== See also ==
- Capital punishment in Canada
- Eddie Slovik, an American executed during World War II for desertion

== Bibliography ==
- Clark, Andrew (2002) A Keen Soldier: the Execution of Second World War Private Harold Joseph Pringle Alfred A. Knopf, Canada, Toronto, ISBN 0-676-97354-X
- Madsen, Chris (1999) Another Kind of Justice: Canadian Military Law from Confederation to Somalia UBC Press, Vancouver, ISBN 0-7748-0718-0
