= The Failure of the New Economics =

Book by Henry Hazlitt (1959)

- First edition
- Author: Henry Hazlitt
- Language: English
- Subject: Economics
- Publisher: Van Nostrand
- Publication date: 1959
- Publication place: United States
- Pages: 458 pp.
- OCLC: 264550952

The Failure of the "New Economics" subtitled An Analysis of The Keynesian Fallacies, (1959) is a book by Henry Hazlitt offering a detailed critique of John Maynard Keynes' work The General Theory of Employment, Interest and Money (1936).

== Overview ==
In his critical analysis of The General Theory Hazlitt embarked on this project because, in his view, although general critiques of Keynes and The General Theory had been made, no critic had completed a detailed analysis of the work.

== Reception ==
The Failure of the "New Economics" sold well but did not have a large impact on the general public or academia. Economic professor Louis Hacker, writing in The New York Times, called Hazlitt's efforts to debunk Keynes a "heroic and perhaps even a Sisyphean task...Mr. Hazlitt, for his part, has written a technical book which is not obscure—although it is difficult reading" and predicted that Hazlitt will be attacked for his book. In 1959, the New York Times Book Review included The Failure of the "New Economics" in its list of "250 Outstanding Books Published in the Past Year."

Austrian economist Ludwig von Mises called it "a devastating criticism of the Keynesian doctrines." Gene Epstein referred to it as a "fantastic read, a lucid, lively, obsessive dissection of the most influential and most overrated economics book of this century: The General Theory of Employment, Interest and Money...A must-read for economists and laymen alike." A review in the New York University Law Review stated: "Henry Hazlitt has shown the work of John Maynard Keynes to be irresponsible, obscurantist, and often simply silly...No one who reads The Failure of the "New Economics" can henceforward take seriously the doctrines associated with the name of Keynes."

A review in the Labor Law Journal noted that The Failure of the "New Economics" "subjects Keynes's celebrated work to a penetrating critical analysis, chapter by-chapter and theorem-by-theorem." A review in Challenge stated: "It is, of course, true that Keynes' ideas have been accepted too uncritically by many economists, and Hazlitt's well-written book should go far toward dispelling such unquestioning acceptance" but that Hazlitt failed to recognize that allowing depressions to "'grind themselves out' in the 'long run' will no longer be tolerated." A review in the Italian journal Giornale degli Economisti e Annali di Economia hoped new opinions like the ones expressed in The Failure of the "New Economics" will help change traditional economic theories promulgated by universities. The Journal of Demographic Economics (originally named the Louvain Economic Review in English) called The Failure of the "New Economics" an "important work...The author analyzes in detail different chapters of the General Theory and highlights the major weaknesses of the ideas that are developed there. This study leads...to a condemnation of Keynesian principles of economic policy."

Keynesian economist Kenneth K. Kurihara wrote that The Failure of the "New Economics" "reflected the critical and hostile attitude of American business circles toward Keynesian analysis and policy."

A review in the Economic Record was critical of Hazlitt's comprehension of demand curves, elasticities, and multipliers and wrote: "[Hazlitt] flattered himself that he could turn mathematical purblindness into a virtue...It is a pity, because the author certainly writes in a vigorous, somewhat sardonic, style of his own...the author is apt to light his rockets at the wrong end. Thus the audience, instead of being treated to some really illuminating fireworks, is merely smothered by stifling clouds of acrid dust."

Reviewer Joseph McKenna, writing in the American Economic Review, commented that while the General Theory is "far from perfect" Hazlitt "does little to improve matters." McKenna stated that Hazlitt failed to clear up the ambiguities in definitions from the General Theory and ignores the fact that the General Theory applies only in conditions of unemployment. Furthermore, McKenna criticizes Hazlitt's positions on mathematical formulas, aggregation, and depressions and writes: "Although Hazlitt clears up many minor points in the General Theory, his analysis of the major ones is completely unsatisfactory."

Post-Keynesian economist Abba P. Lerner criticized Hazlitt for his assumption of a world with full employment where wages rates are permitted to fall during a depression. Lerner also criticized Hazlitt for "missing some of the basic elements of the Keynesian analysis" such as failing to distinguish between thrift and savings and his interpretation of Say's law.
