= Class struggle =

Concept in political and social science

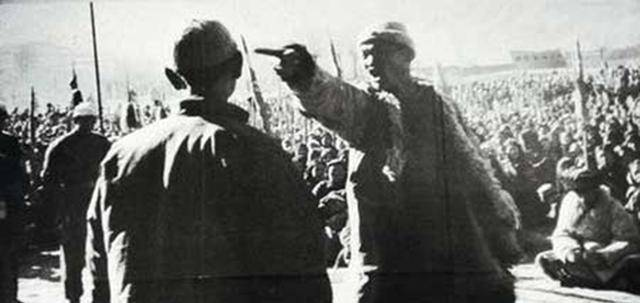
Farmer confronting landlord during China's Land Reform Movement

In political science, the terms class struggle, class conflict, and class war refer to the economic antagonism and political tension that can arise between social classes due to clashing interests, competition for limited resources, and inequalities of power within a socioeconomic hierarchy. Commonly cited historical examples of class antagonists include slave masters and slaves, feudal lords and serfs, landowners and tenants, and capitalists and workers.

The writings of several leftist, socialist, and communist theorists portray class struggle as a core tenet and a practical means for effecting radical sociopolitical transformations for the majority working class. It is also a central concept within conflict theories of sociology and political philosophy.

Class struggle can reveal itself through:

- Direct violence, such as assassinations, coups, revolutions, counterrevolutions, and civil wars for control of government, natural resources, and labor;
- Indirect violence, such as deaths from poverty, malnutrition, illness, and unsafe workplaces;
- Economic coercion, such as boycotts and strikes, the threat of unemployment and capital flight, the withdrawal of investment capital;
- Political machinations through lobbying (legal and illegal), bribery of legislators, voter suppression and disenfranchisement;
- Ideological struggle by way of propaganda and political literature.

In the economic sphere, class struggle is sometimes expressed overtly, such as owner lockouts of employees in an effort to weaken the bargaining power of the employees' union; or covertly, such as a worker slowdown of production or the widespread, simultaneous use of sick leave (e.g., "blue flu") to protest unfair labor practices, low wages, poor work conditions, or a perceived injustice to a fellow worker.

== Usage ==
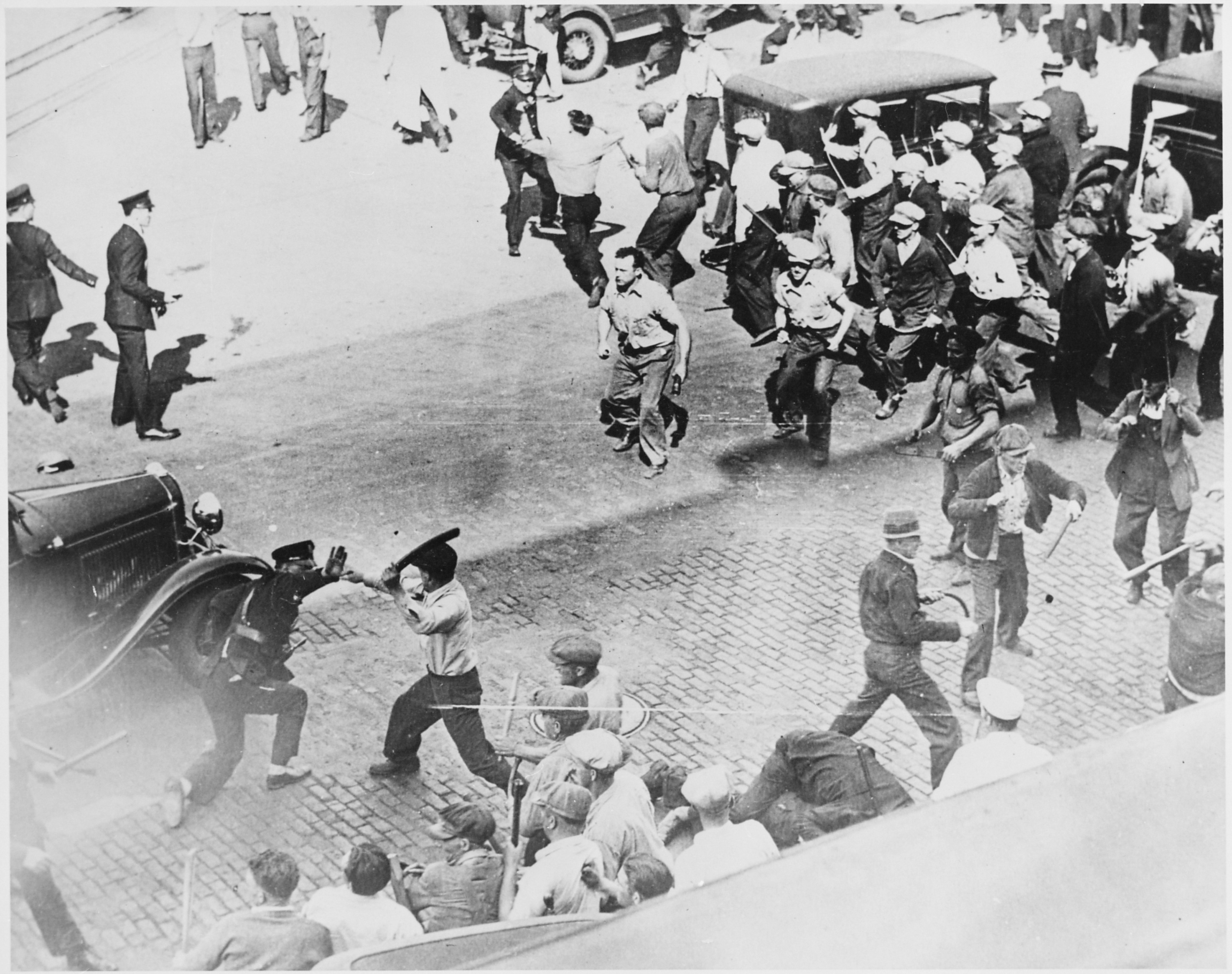
Truck drivers fight the police in the course of the Minneapolis Teamsters Strike of 1934.

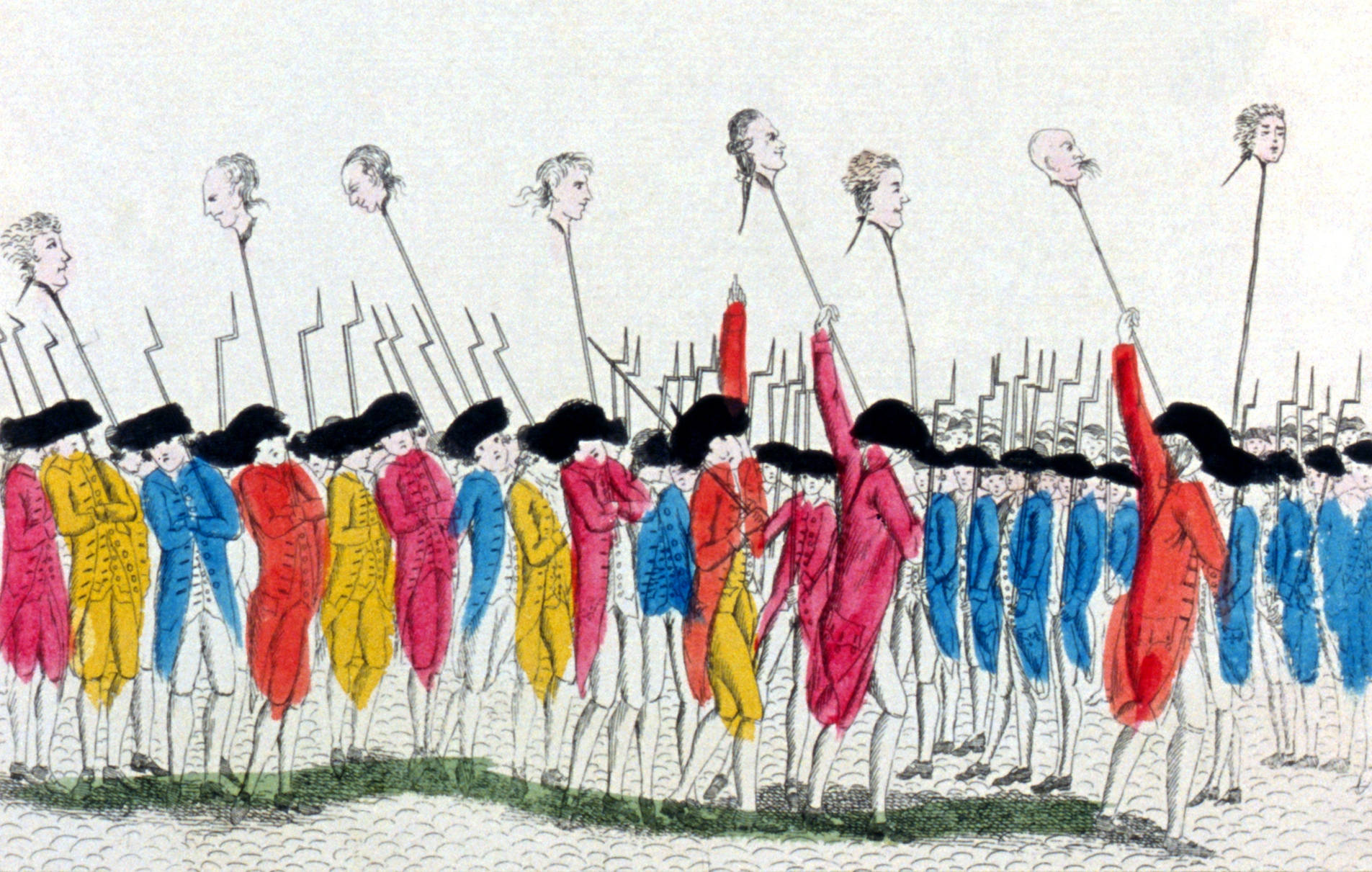
Heads of aristocrats on pikes at the storming of the Bastille

When Marxists speak of class struggle, they define a class primarily in economic terms, i.e., by its relationship to the means of production. When anarchists like Bakunin speak of class struggle, they have a broader definition of "social class" that encompasses "notions of domination and privilege" in political, cultural, and economic spheres. Bakunin believed that the successful struggle of the dominated classes would achieve a revolution to depose the ruling elites and create a stateless or libertarian socialism, and that a prerequisite for successful revolution is class solidarity.

Marx's theory of history asserts that in the history of economic systems such as capitalism and feudalism, class struggle is "the central fact of social evolution." Indeed, the first sentence of Chapter 1 of the Communist Manifesto reads: "The history of all hitherto existing society is the history of class struggles." Marxists view the struggle's resolution in favor of the working class as inevitable under plutocratic capitalism.

== Oligarchs versus commoners in Ancient Greece ==
Where societies are divided by wealth, status, or control of social production and distribution, class structures arise and are thus coeval with civilization itself. The rise of class structures eventually leads to class conflict. It is a pattern that has repeated since at least European classical antiquity as illustrated in the Conflict of the Orders and the slave revolt led by Spartacus.

=== Thucydides ===
In his History, Thucydides recounts a class-based civil war in the city of Corcyra between the pro-Athens party of the common people and their pro-Corinth oligarchic opposition. Near the climax of the struggle, "the oligarchs in full rout, fearing that the victorious commons might assault and carry the arsenal and put them to the sword, fired the houses round the market-place and the lodging-houses, in order to bar their advance." The historian Tacitus would later narrate a similar class conflict in the city of Seleucia, in which disharmony between the oligarchs and the commoners resulted in each side calling on outside help to defeat the other.

=== Socrates ===
Socrates was the first Greek philosopher to describe class conflict. In Plato's Republic, Socrates is quoted as saying that "any city, however small, is in fact divided into two, one the city of the poor, the other [the city] of the rich; these [cities] are at war with one another." He disapproved of oligarchies, in which wealthy property owners take positions of political power in order to dominate the large social class of impoverished commoners. Socrates used the analogy of a maritime pilot who, like the power-holder in a polis, ought to be chosen for his skill, not for the amount of property he owns.

=== Aristotle ===
In Politics, Aristotle analyzes the basic dimensions of class conflict: "[B]ecause the rich are generally few in number, while the poor are many, they appear to be antagonistic, and as the one or the other prevails they form the government.". To lessen class antagonism in Greece's slave society, Aristotle proposed a middle way between indulgence and cruelty in the treatment of slaves by their masters, averring that "if not kept in hand, [slaves] are insolent, and think that they are as good as their masters, and, if harshly treated, they hate and conspire against them." As Charles A. Beard wrote, much of Politics is concerned with achieving political stability by moderating extreme behaviors by different economic groups.

=== Plutarch ===
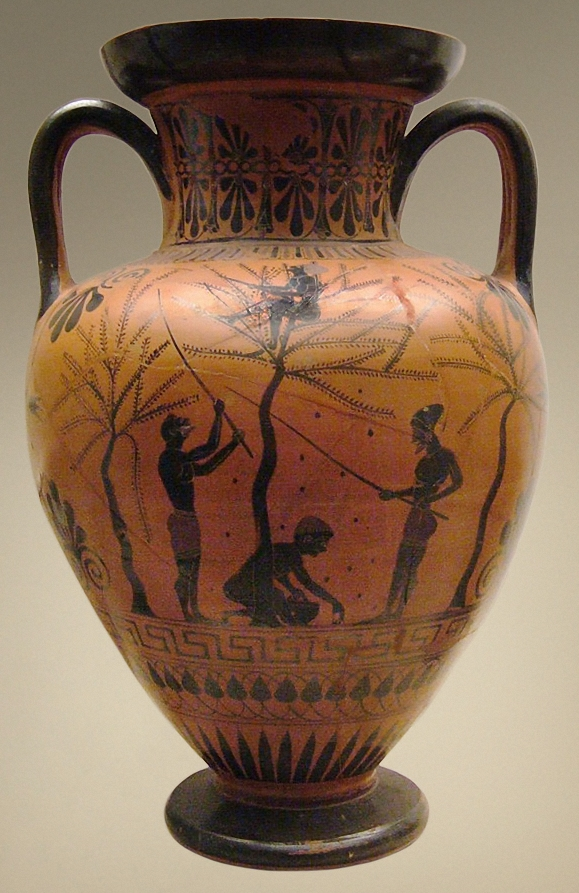
This 6th-century Athenian black-figure urn, in the British Museum, depicts the olive harvest. Many farmers, enslaved for debt, would have worked on large estates for their creditors.

The historian Plutarch recounts how the Greek people engaged in a battle against the aristocratic class. Financially oppressed by their indebtedness to the aristocrats, the mass of Athenians chose Solon to be the lawgiver to lead them to freedom from their creditors. The philosopher Georg Wilhelm Friedrich Hegel said that Solon's constitution of the Athenian popular assembly created a political sphere that balanced the competing interests of the factions in Athens.

Taking sides in Greece's class conflicts was sometimes dangerous. In Parallel Lives, Plutarch wrote of two Spartan kings, Cleomenes and Agis, who both met tragic ends after "being desirous to raise the people, and to restore the noble and just form of government ... [they] incurred the hatred of the rich and powerful, who could not endure to be deprived of the selfish enjoyment to which they were accustomed."

== Patricians versus plebeians in Ancient Rome ==
It was similarly difficult for the Romans to maintain peace between the upper-class patricians and the lower-class plebeians. French Enlightenment philosopher Montesquieu stated that this conflict intensified after the overthrow of the Roman monarchy. In The Spirit of Laws he lists the four main grievances of the plebeians, which were rectified in the years following the deposition of King Tarquin:

- The patricians had much too easy access to positions of public service.
- The constitution granted the consuls far too much power.
- The plebeians were constantly verbally slighted.
- The plebeians had too little power in their assemblies.

=== Camillus ===
The Senate had the ability to give a magistrate the power of dictatorship, meaning he could bypass public law in the pursuit of a prescribed mandate. Montesquieu explained that the purpose of this institution was to tilt the balance of power in favour of the patricians. However, in an attempt to resolve a conflict between the patricians and the plebeians, the dictator Camillus used his power of dictatorship to coerce the Senate into giving the plebeians the right to choose one of the two consuls.

=== Marius ===
Tacitus believed that the increase in Roman power spurred the patricians to expand their power over more and more cities. This process, he felt, exacerbated pre-existing class tensions with the plebeians, and eventually culminated in a civil war between the patrician Sulla and the populist reformer Marius. Marius had taken the step of enlisting capite censi, the very lowest class of citizens, into the army, for the first time allowing non-land owners into the legions.

=== Tiberius Gracchus ===
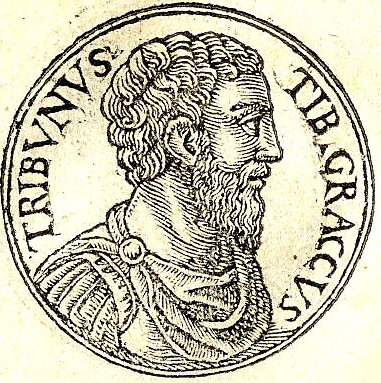
Tiberius Gracchus

Of the notable figures discussed by Plutarch and Tacitus, agrarian reformer Tiberius Gracchus was an ardent champion of the lower classes. In a speech to common soldiers, he decried their conditions:

[T]he men who bear arms, and expose their lives for the safety of their country, enjoy in the meantime nothing more in it but the air and light; and having no houses or settlements of their own, are constrained to wander from place to place with their wives and children."

He added that soldiers "fought indeed and were slain, but it was to maintain the luxury and the wealth of other men." Tiberius diminished the power of the Senate by changing the law so that judges were chosen from the ranks of the knights, instead of from their social superiors in the senatorial class. Cicero believed that the reforming efforts of Tiberius saved Rome from tyranny.

=== Julius Caesar ===
In Shakespeare's tragedy Julius Caesar, the senatorial assassins of Caesar were portrayed as striking a blow against a would-be tyrant. Historian Michael Parenti argued instead that Caesar was a populist, not a tyrant, who was enacting policies to benefit the common people of Rome. In this interpretation, the assassination was an act of class warfare by wealthy Romans to preserve their grip on power.

=== Coriolanus ===
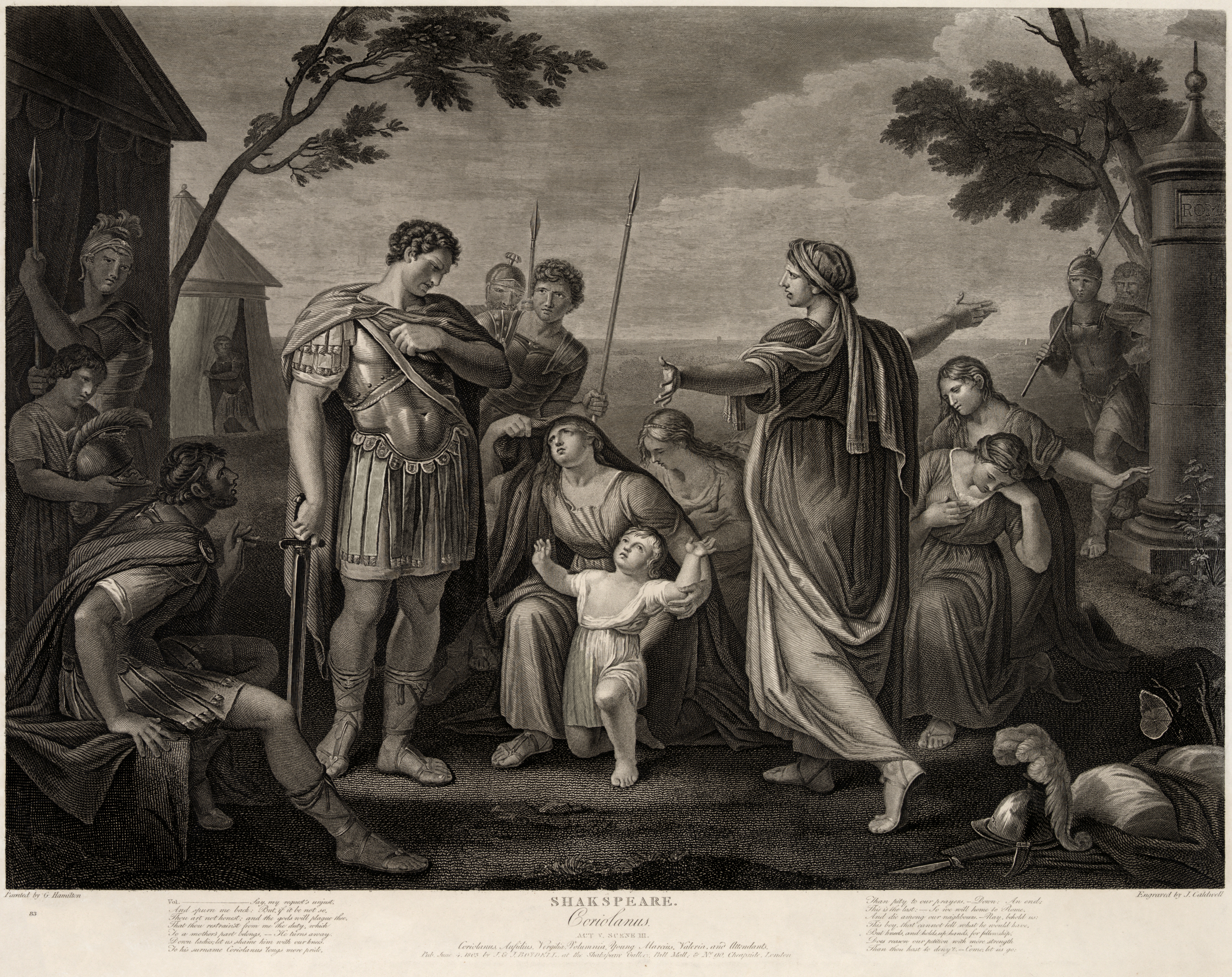
Coriolanus, Act V, Scene III. Engraved by James Caldwell from a painting by Gavin Hamilton.

The patrician Coriolanus, whose life Shakespeare depicted in the play Coriolanus, fought for his class and against the plebeians. The play includes the language of class conflict. In the opening scene, a mob of angry plebeians gathers in Rome to denounce Coriolanus as the "chief enemy to the people", with the leader of the mob speaking out against Roman patricians:

They ne'er cared for us yet: suffer us to famish, and their store-houses crammed with grain; make edicts for usury, to support usurers; repeal daily any wholesome act established against the rich, and provide more piercing statutes daily, to chain up and restrain the poor. If the wars eat us not up, they will; and there's all the love they bear us.

Plutarch writes that when grain arrived to relieve a serious shortage in Rome, the plebeians said it should be divided amongst them as a gift, but Coriolanus stood up in the Senate against this idea on the grounds that it would empower the plebeians at the expense of the patricians. This decision would eventually contribute to Coriolanus's undoing when he was impeached following a trial by the tribunes of the plebs. Montesquieu recounts how Coriolanus castigated the tribunes for trying a patrician, when in his mind no one but a consul had that right, although a law had been passed stipulating that all appeals affecting the life of a citizen had to be brought before the plebeians.

=== Landlessness and debt ===
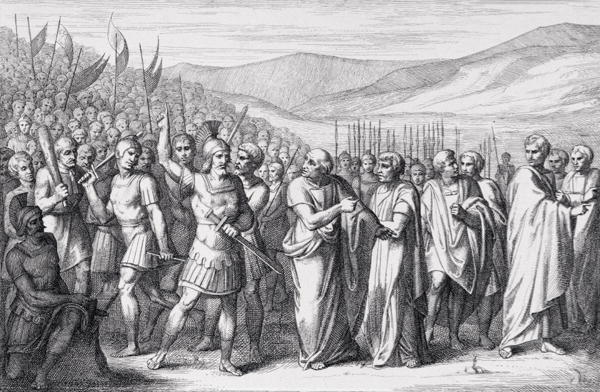
The Secession of the People to the Mons Sacer. Engraving by B. Barloccini, 1849.

Historian Edward Gibbon also chronicled Roman class conflict. In the third volume of The History of the Decline and Fall of the Roman Empire, he relates the origins of the conflict:

[T]he plebeians of Rome [...] had been oppressed from the earliest times by the weight of debt and usury; and the husbandman, during the term of his military service, was obliged to abandon the cultivation of his farm. The lands of Italy which had been originally divided among the families of free and indigent proprietors, were insensibly purchased or usurped by the avarice of the nobles; and in the age which preceded the fall of the republic, it was computed that only two thousand citizens were possessed of an independent substance.

Hegel similarly states that the "severity of the patricians their creditors, the debts due to whom they had to discharge by slave-work, drove the plebeians to revolts." Gibbon explains how Augustus sought to pacify the plebeians with bread and circuses.

The economist Adam Smith noted that the poor freeman's lack of land was a driving force for Roman colonisation, as a way to relieve class tensions at home between the rich and the landless poor. Hegel described the same phenomenon as being the impetus to Greek colonisation.

== Enlightenment era ==
Writing in pre-capitalist Europe, the Swiss philosophe Jean-Jacques Rousseau and the Federalist statesman James Madison across the Atlantic Ocean made significant remarks on the dynamics of class struggle. Later, German idealist Georg Wilhelm Friedrich Hegel would also contribute his perspective to the discussion around class conflict between employers and employees.

=== Jean-Jacques Rousseau ===
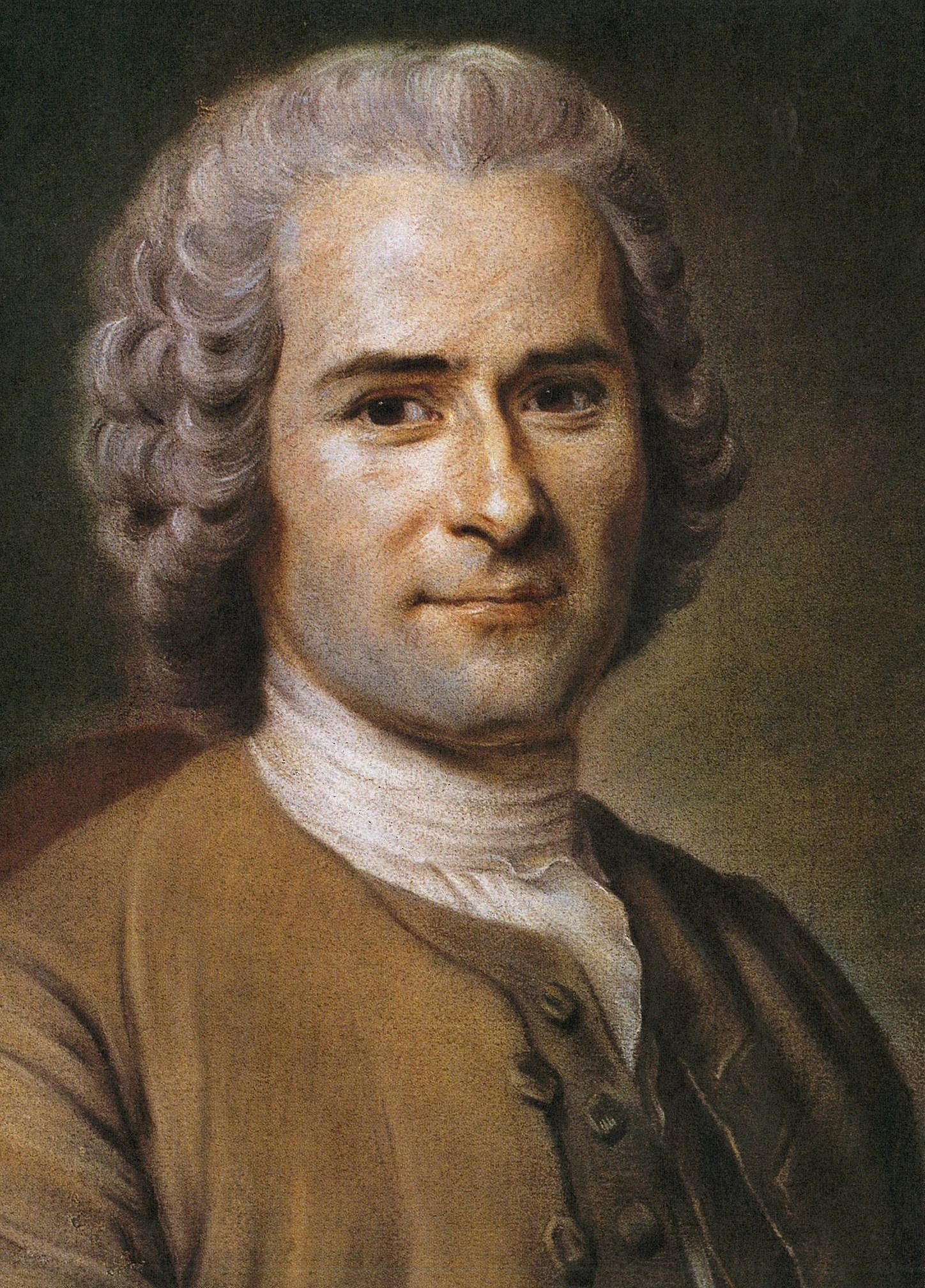
Rousseau by Maurice Quentin de La Tour, 1753

It was with bitter sarcasm that Rousseau outlined the class conflict prevailing in his day between masters and their workmen:

You have need of me, because I am rich and you are poor. We will therefore come to an agreement. I will permit you to have the honour of serving me, on condition that you bestow on me the little you have left, in return for the pains I shall take to command you.

Rousseau suggested that the most important function of any government is to fight on the side of workmen against their masters, who he said engage in exploitation under the pretence of serving society. Specifically, he believed that governments should actively intervene in the economy to abolish poverty and prevent the accrual of too much wealth in the hands of too few men.

=== Thomas Jefferson ===
American founding father Thomas Jefferson worried that a sharp disparity between classes, which he had observed in Europe, would get replicated in the newly formed United States. He wrote in a 1787 letter to Edward Carrington that in Europe,

under pretence of governing they have divided their nations into two classes, wolves & sheep. I do not exaggerate. This is a true picture of Europe.... It seems to be the law of our general nature, in spite of individual exceptions; and experience declares that man is the only animal which devours his own kind, for I can apply no milder term to the governments of Europe, and to the general prey of the rich on the poor.

Jefferson advocated for a free press to mitigate this type of class divide.

=== James Madison ===
In Federalist No. 10, James Madison commented on the conflict between rich and poor, stating that "the most common and durable source of factions has been the various and unequal distribution of property. Those who hold and those who are without property have ever formed distinct interests in society. Those who are creditors, and those who are debtors, fall under a like discrimination." He wrote that a vital role of government was to manage and regulate a society's class-based factions.

=== Georg Wilhelm Friedrich Hegel ===
In his Philosophy of Right, Hegel expressed concern that the standard of living of the poor might drop so far as to make it even easier for the rich to amass more wealth. He believed that, especially in a liberal country such as contemporary England, the poorest will politicise their situation, channelling their frustrations against the rich:

Against nature man can claim no right, but once society is established, poverty immediately takes the form of a wrong done to one class by another.

== Capitalist societies ==
Class conflict is most commonly described as occurring within capitalist societies. The conflict manifests itself as clashes between the capitalist class and working class, and takes the form of disputes over hours of work, amount paid in wages, division of profits, culture in the workplace, cost of consumer goods, cost of rent, control over parliament or government bureaucracy, and economic inequality. Even a seemingly benign humanitarian program such as government-provided disaster relief can exacerbate class conflict if the relief is seen as being unequally distributed depending on the recipient's class.

=== Adam Smith ===
As a liberal political economist, Adam Smith believed that the amassing of property in the hands of a minority naturally resulted in a disharmonious state of affairs. He wrote that "avarice and ambition in the rich, in the poor the hatred of labour and the love of present ease and enjoyment, are the passions which prompt to invade property", requiring a government to protect property rights, which he elaborated on in The Wealth of Nations:

Wherever there is a great property, there is great inequality. For one very rich man, there must be at least five hundred poor, and the affluence of the few supposes the indigence of the many. The affluence of the rich excites the indignation of the poor, who are often both driven by want, and prompted by envy to invade his possessions. It is only under the shelter of the civil magistrate, that the owner of that valuable property, which is acquired by the labour of many years, or perhaps of many successive generations, can sleep a single night in security. He is at all times surrounded by unknown enemies, whom, though he never provoked, he can never appease, and from whose injustice he can be protected only by the powerful arm of the civil magistrate, continually held up to chastise it.

Smith observed that, outside of colonies where land is cheap and labour expensive, both the masters who subsist by profit and the masters who subsist by rents will work in tandem to subjugate the class of workmen, who subsist by wages. He analyzed wage levels in terms of the conflicting interests of owners of capital and of labourers. Of the latter, he said they were often compelled to form trade unions for fear of suffering starvation wages:

What are the common wages of labour, depends everywhere upon the contract usually made between those two parties, whose interests are by no means the same. The workmen desire to get as much, the masters to give as little, as possible. The former are disposed to combine in order to raise, the latter in order to lower, the wages of labour.

=== Karl Marx ===
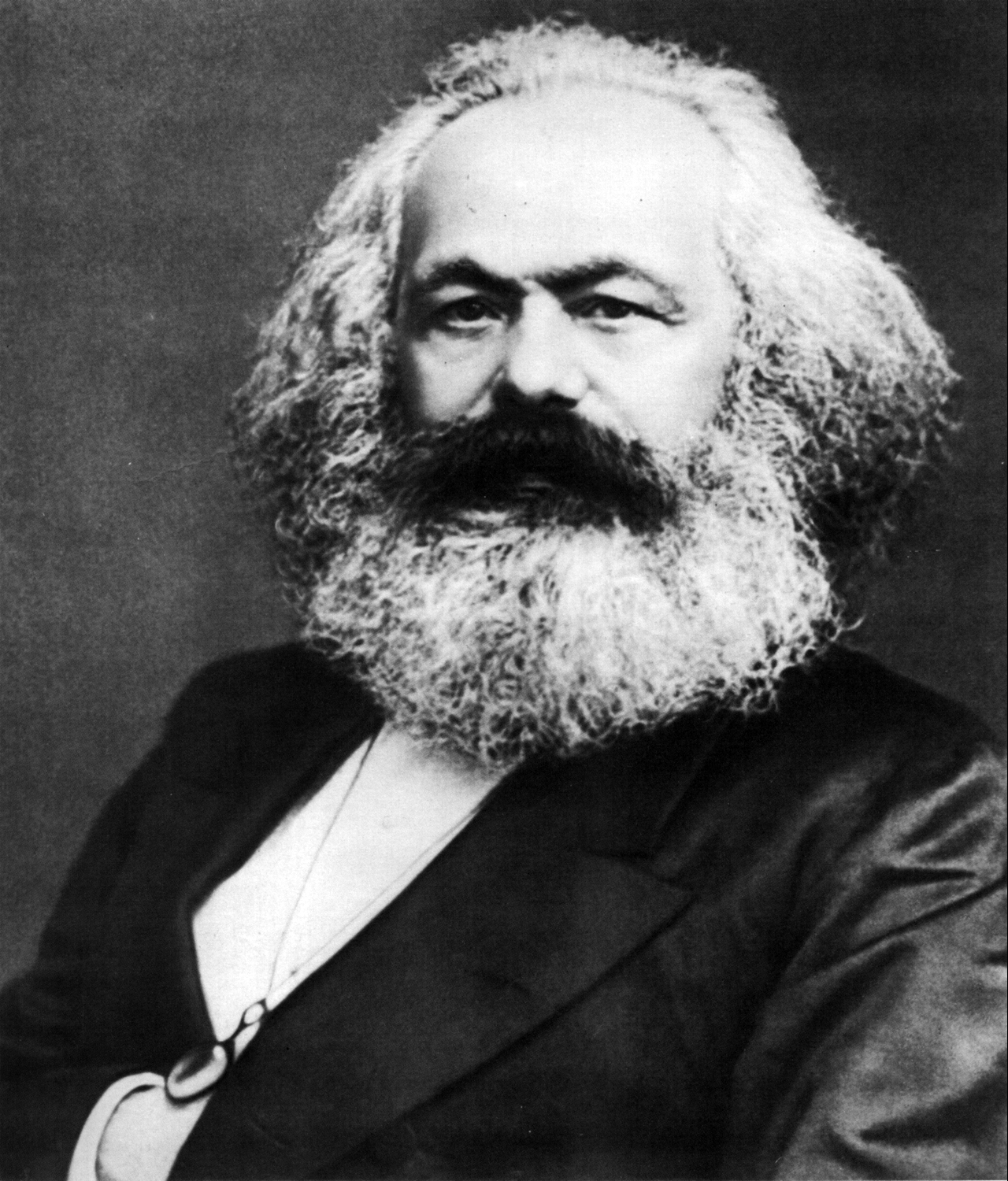
Karl Marx, 1875

In his writings, Karl Marx argued that classes had formed in history due to changes in the mode of production. Members of a class may become aware of their economic position in society, achieving what is known as class consciousness. For workers, this happens when they become aware of their exploitation at the hands of the capitalist class. According to Marx, workers then take action against capitalists, and vice versa.

In his analysis of 19th-century industrial society, he identified two main groups as the source of social stratification, which in his view generated class conflict:

- Labour (the proletariat or workers) includes anyone who earns their livelihood by selling their labor power and being paid a wage or salary for their labor time. They have little choice but to work for capital, since they typically have no independent way to survive.
- Capital (the bourgeoisie or capitalists) includes anyone who gets their income not from labor as much as from the surplus value they appropriate from the workers who create wealth. The income of the capitalists, therefore, is based on their exploitation of the workers (proletariat).

In Marxist theory, class struggle becomes a more potent factor as it becomes more general, as industries are organized rather than crafts, as workers agitate for systemic change, and as their class consciousness rises. Marx referred to this as the progress of the proletariat from being a class "in itself", i.e., merely a position in the social structure, to being one "for itself", an active and conscious force that could change the world.

While Marx elevated the importance of the class struggle, he did not claim to have discovered it. He acknowledged his debt to Adam Smith and other earlier economists and historians. In an 1852 letter to Joseph Weydemeyer, Marx wrote: "And now as to myself, no credit is due to me for discovering the existence of classes in modern society nor yet the struggle between them. Long before me bourgeois historians had described the historical development of this class struggle and bourgeois economists the economic anatomy of the classes."

He believed the class struggle would result in the revolutionary overthrow of the bourgeoisie, and that private property would become communally owned. He predicted that after a revolution, as class boundaries broke down, the need for a state apparatus would diminish, which would lead to a classless, stateless communist society.

=== John Stuart Mill ===
Like Adam Smith, John Stuart Mill was a liberal political economist concerned with class conflict. In his Considerations on Representative Government, he notes the complete marginalisation of workmen's voices in Parliament, rhetorically asking whether its members ever empathise with the position of workmen, instead of siding entirely with their masters, on issues such as the right to go on strike. Later in the book, he argues that an important function of representative government is to provide a relatively equal balance of power between workmen and masters, in order to prevent threats to the good of the whole of society.

=== Max Weber ===
While Max Weber accepted the Marxian notion of classes in conflict due to stratification, he did not reduce it to a binary struggle between the bourgeoisie and proletariat. Instead, Weber claimed that society contained multiple strata, stemming from differences in property ownership, political power, and social standing. His multiclass approach to social stratification went beyond economic factors to also include differences in status and prestige.

=== Charles Comte and Charles Dunoyer ===
Charles Comte and Charles Dunoyer believed that class struggle was engendered by factions that managed to gain control of the state apparatus. The ruling classes are the groups that seize the power of the state to carry out their political agenda; the ruled are then taxed and regulated by the state for the benefit of the ruling classes. Through taxation, subsidies, tax codes, laws, and privileges, the state creates class conflict by giving preferential treatment to some at the expense of others. In the free market, by contrast, exchanges are not carried out by force but by the non-aggression principle of cooperation in a win-win scenario.

=== Other perspectives ===
One of the first writers to comment on class struggle in the modern sense of the term was the French revolutionary François Boissel. Other class struggle commentators include Henri de Saint-Simon, Augustin Thierry, François Guizot, François-Auguste Mignet and Adolphe Thiers. The Physiocrats, David Ricardo, and after Marx, Henry George noted the inelastic supply of land and argued that this created certain privileges (economic rent) for landowners. According to the historian Arnold J. Toynbee, stratification along lines of class appears only within civilizations, and furthermore only appears during the process of a civilization's decline while not characterizing the growth phase of a civilization.

Pierre-Joseph Proudhon, in What is Property? (1840) states that "certain classes do not relish investigation into the pretended titles to property, and its fabulous and perhaps scandalous history." While Proudhon saw the solution as the lower classes forming an alternative, solidarity economy centered on cooperatives and self-managed workplaces, which would slowly undermine and replace capitalist class society, the anarchist Mikhail Bakunin insisted that a massive class struggle by the working class, peasantry and poor was essential to the creation of libertarian socialism. This would require a final showdown in the form of a social revolution.

One of the earliest analyses of the development of class as the development of conflicts between emergent classes is available in Peter Kropotkin's Mutual Aid. In this work, Kropotkin analyzes the disposal of goods after death in pre-class or hunter-gatherer societies, and how inheritance produces early class divisions and conflict.

Fascists have often opposed 'horizontal' class struggle in favour of vertical national struggle and instead have attempted to appeal to the working class while promising to preserve the existing social classes and have proposed an alternative concept known as class collaboration.

== Twentieth and twenty-first centuries ==
=== Soviet Union and similar societies ===
A variety of thinkers, mostly Trotskyist and anarchist, argue that class conflict existed in Soviet-style societies. Their arguments describe as a class the bureaucratic stratum formed by the ruling political party (known as the nomenklatura in the Soviet Union), sometimes termed a "new class", that controls and guides the means of production. This ruling class is viewed to be in opposition to the remainder of society, generally considered the proletariat. This type of system has been referred to as state socialism, state capitalism, bureaucratic collectivism or new class societies.

However, Harpal Brar contends that unlike in capitalism, the Soviet elites did not own the means of production nor did they accumulate surplus value for their personal wealth, as the generated profit from the economy was recycled into Soviet society. Orthodox Trotskyists such as Ernest Mandel criticized the concept of a new ruling class as an oxymoron, saying: "The hypothesis of the bureaucracy's being a new ruling class leads to the conclusion that, for the first time in history, we are confronted with a 'ruling class' which does not exist as a class before it actually rules."

=== China ===
The 8th National Congress of the Chinese Communist Party concluded in 1956 that class struggle should not be taken as the "key link" in a society that had become socialist and that the CCP should focus on modernization.

The December 1978 third plenary session of the 11th CCP Central Committee issued a communique stating, "[L]arge scale turbulent class struggles of a mass character have in the main come to an end." It described the CCP's focus going forward as socialist modernization, particularly through the Four Modernizations.

In 1981, the Resolution on Certain Questions in the History of Our Party since the Founding of the People's Republic of China stated that the 8th National Congress's conclusion that class struggle not be taken as the "key link" had been correct.

=== United States ===
Class conflict was present in the earliest days of the U.S. with the struggles between slaveowners and slaves. Since slavery's abolition, class conflict is more often noted in labor-management disputes. In 1933, Edward Hamilton of the Airline Pilot's Association used the term "class warfare" to describe airline management's opposition at the National Labor Board hearings that year. Apart from daily forms of class conflict, there are also periods of crisis or revolution when the conflict takes on a violent nature and involves repression, assault, restriction of civil liberties, and assassinations or death squads.

Sociologist Thomas Volscho argues that the neoliberal revolution starting in the late 1970s resulted from a class conflict in which the political mobilizations of an increasingly class-conscious capitalist elite "against the New Deal of the 1930s, War on Poverty programs from the 1960s, and the power of organized labor" dramatically increased both the political power of Wall Street and economic inequality.

American billionaire investor Warren Buffett said on several occasions that his class, the "rich class", is waging class warfare on the rest of society. He told CNN in 2005: "It's class warfare, my class is winning, but they shouldn't be." He echoed these remarks in a New York Times interview: "There's class warfare all right, but it's my class, the rich class, that's making war, and we're winning." Chris Hedges argues that increased class struggle and strikes by organized workers in the post Covid era, often in defiance of union leadership, is the "one last hope for the United States."

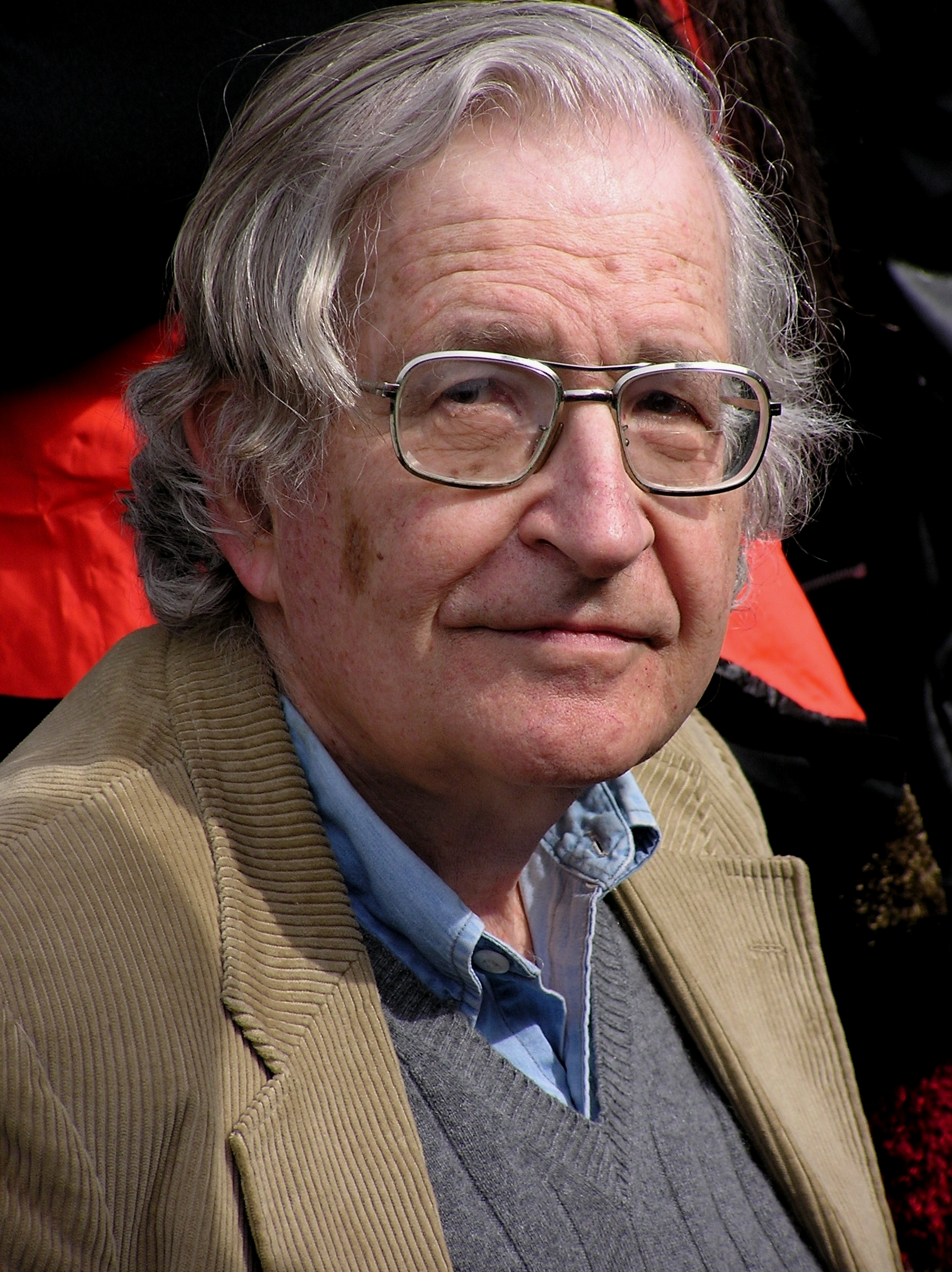
Noam Chomsky, 2004

The political activist Noam Chomsky also spoke on the subject of class conflict in the U.S.:

Well, there's always a class war going on. The United States, to an unusual extent, is a business-run society, more so than others. The business classes are very class-conscious – they're constantly fighting a bitter class war to improve their power and diminish opposition. Occasionally this is recognized... The enormous benefits given to the very wealthy, the privileges for the very wealthy here, are way beyond those of other comparable societies and are part of the ongoing class war. Take a look at CEO salaries...

Michael Parenti wrote in 1993 that not all instances of class struggle are radical, violent or aggressive, as in the case of strikes, lockouts, workplace sabotage, and assassination. He wrote that class antagonism can surface in minor acts of pilferage, low worker morale, and individual worker resistance to petty authority and hoarding of information. On the employers' side, lobbying for anti-union laws and against minimum wage increases, and hiring union-busting legal firms are expressions of class struggle.

The 2024 killing of United Healthcare CEO Brian Thompson was portrayed by some as an act of class warfare. Luigi Mangione was charged with the shooting, and a manifesto attributed to him harshly criticized the health insurance industry. According to NBC, there were social media posts celebrating Thompson's death, mentioning other powerful business figures as potential targets, and calling the shooting the opening blow of a class war.

=== Post-2008 financial crisis ===
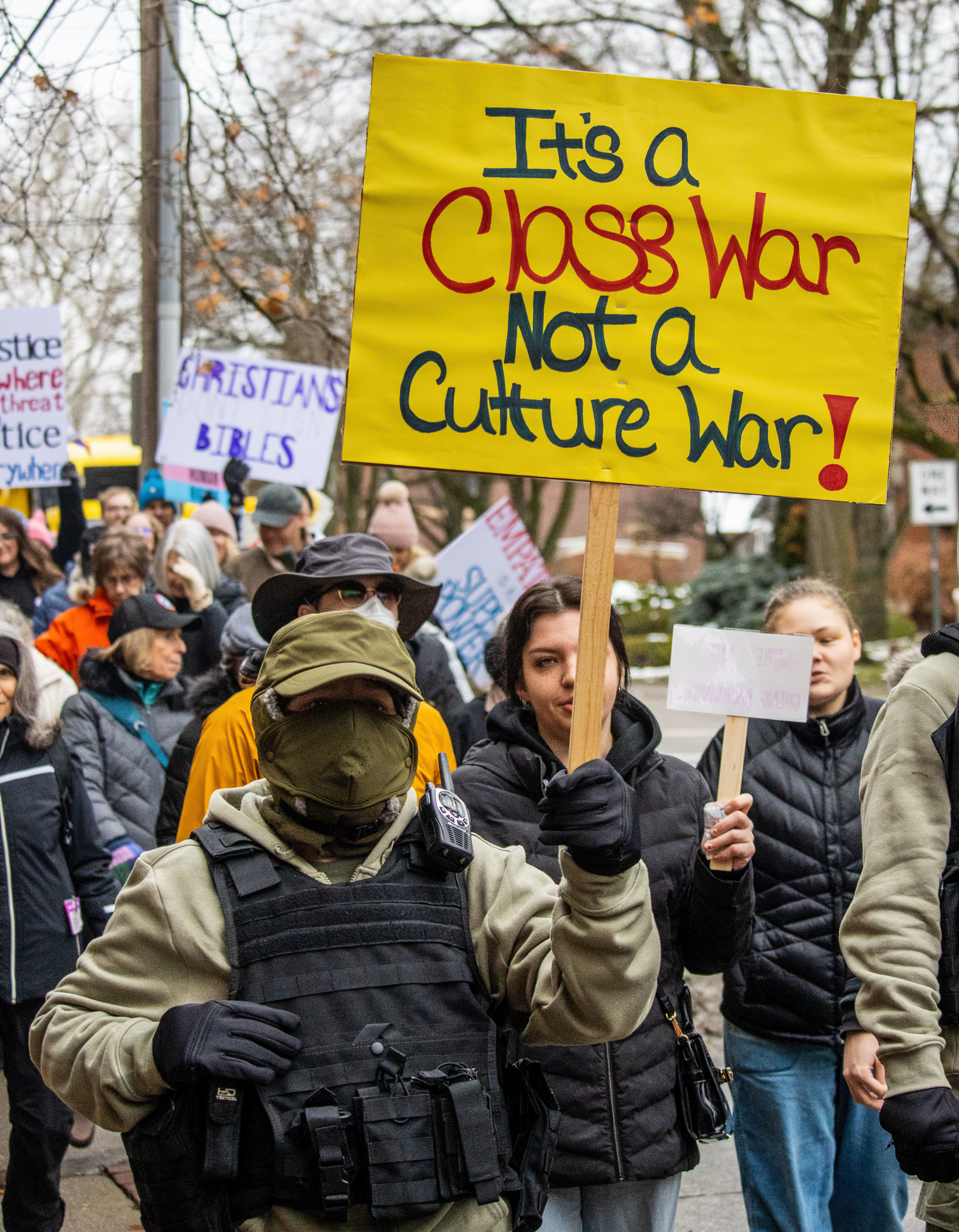
Protester at the People's March in Columbus, Ohio, with sign reading, "It's a class war, not a culture war!"

Class conflict intensified in the period after the 2008 financial crisis, which led to a global wave of anti-austerity protests, including the Greek and Spanish Indignados movements and later the Occupy movement, whose slogan was "We are the 99%", signalling a more expansive class antagonist against the financial elite than that of the classical Marxist proletariat.

In the speech "The Great American Class War" (2013), the journalist Bill Moyers asserted the existence of social-class conflict between democracy and plutocracy in the U.S.

Historian Steve Fraser, author of The Age of Acquiescence, asserted in 2014 that class conflict is an inevitability if current political and economic conditions continue, noting that "people are increasingly fed up [...] their voices are not being heard. And I think that can only go on for so long without there being more and more outbreaks of what used to be called class struggle, class warfare."

=== Arab Spring ===
Often seen as part of the same "movement of squares" as the Indignado and Occupy movements, the Arab Spring was a wave of social protests starting in 2011. Numerous factors have culminated in the Arab Spring, including rejection of dictatorship or absolute monarchy, human rights violations, government corruption (demonstrated by Wikileaks diplomatic cables), economic decline, unemployment, extreme poverty, and a number of demographic structural factors, such as a large percentage of educated but dissatisfied youth within the population. but class conflict is also a key factor. The catalysts for the revolts in all Northern African and Persian Gulf countries have been the concentration of wealth in the hands of autocrats in power for decades, insufficient transparency of its redistribution, corruption, and especially the refusal of the youth to accept the status quo.

== Relationship to race ==
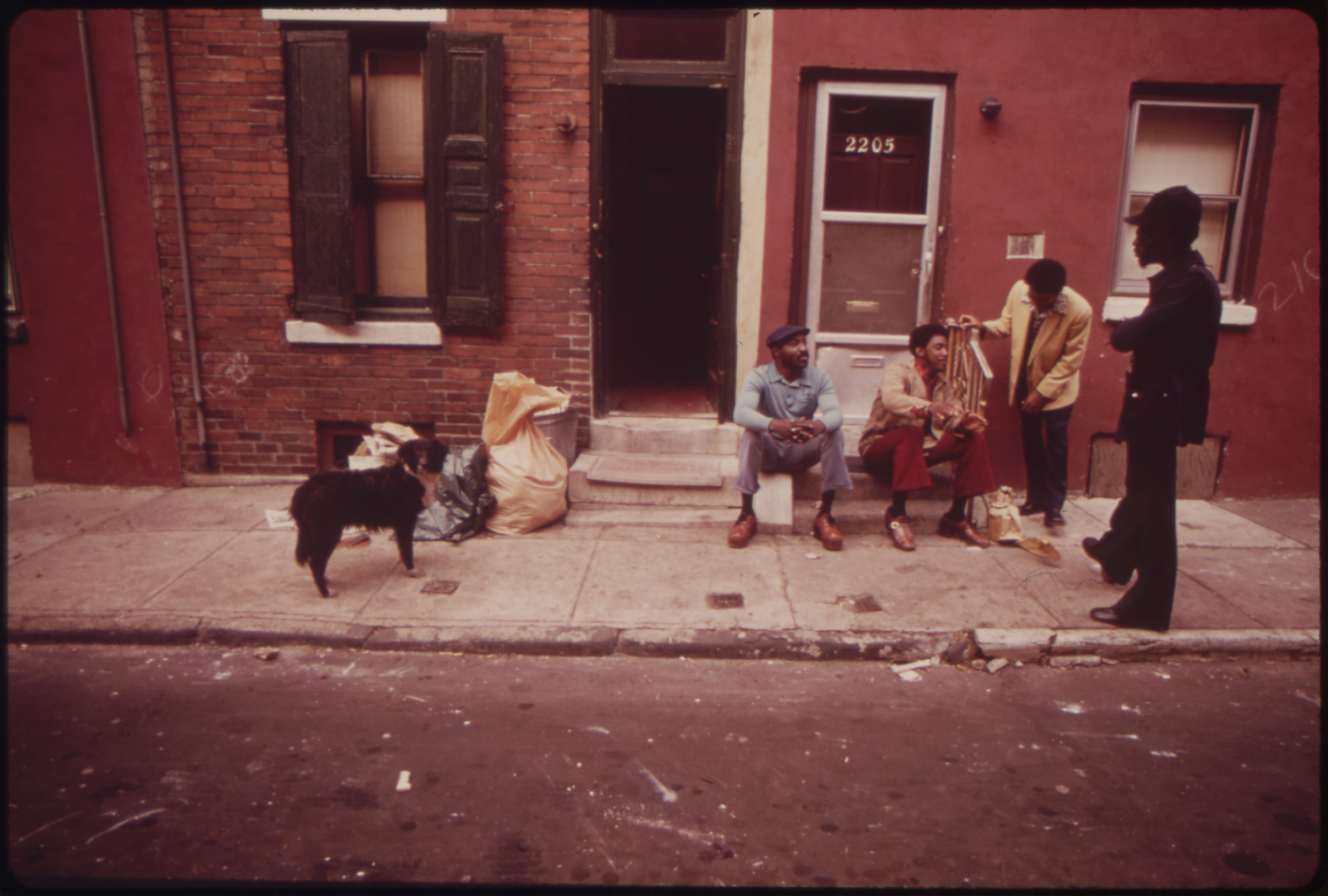
Jobless black workers in the heat of the Philadelphia summer, 1973

Some historical tendencies of orthodox Marxism reject racism, sexism, etc. as struggles that essentially distract from class struggle, the real conflict. These divisions within the class prevent the purported antagonists from acting in their common class interest. However, many Marxist internationalists and anti-colonial revolutionaries believe that sex, race and class are bound up together. Within Marxist scholarship there is an ongoing debate about these topics.

According to Michel Foucault, in the 19th century, the essentialist notion of the "race" was incorporated by racists, biologists, and eugenicists, who gave it the modern sense of "biological race" which was then integrated into "state racism". On the other hand, Foucault claims that when Marxists developed their concept of "class struggle", they were partly inspired by the older, non-biological notions of the "race" and the "race struggle". Quoting a non-existent 1882 letter from Marx to Friedrich Engels during a lecture, Foucault erroneously claimed Marx wrote: "You know very well where we found our idea of class struggle; we found it in the work of the French historians who talked about the race struggle." For Foucault, the theme of social war provides the overriding principle that connects class and race struggle.

Moses Hess, an important theoretician and labor Zionist of the early socialist movement, in his "Epilogue" to "Rome and Jerusalem" argued that "the race struggle is primary, the class struggle secondary. [...] With the cessation of race antagonism, the class struggle will also come to a standstill. The equalization of all classes of society will necessarily follow the emancipation of all the races, for it will ultimately become a scientific question of social economics."

W. E. B. Du Bois theorized that the intersectional paradigms of race, class, and nation might explain certain aspects of black political economy. Patricia Hill Collins writes: "Du Bois saw race, class, and nation not primarily as personal identity categories but as social hierarchies that shaped African-American access to status, poverty, and power."

In modern times, emerging schools of thought in the U.S. and other countries hold the opposite to be true. They argue that the race struggle is less important, because the primary struggle is that of class since labor of all races face the same problems and injustices.

== Chronology ==
Nationalist movements are not included.

Classical antiquity:
- Gracchi Tribuneship
- Social War, 91–88 BC
- Gallic Wars and the assassination of Julius Caesar
- Conflict of the Orders
- Roman Servile Wars
- Yellow Turban Rebellion, 184–205 AD

Middle Ages:

- Popular revolt in late medieval Europe
- Ciompi in Florence, 1378
- Peasants' Revolt in England, 1381
- Jacquerie in 14th-century France
- Saint George's Night Uprising

Modern era:

- German Peasants' War since 1524
- Shimabara Rebellion, 1637–1638
- English Civil War, 1642–1651
- French Revolution since 1789
- Old Price Riots, 1809
- July Revolution, 1830
- Canut revolts in Lyon since 1831, often considered as the beginning of the modern labor movement
- June Rebellion, 1832
- Anti-Rent War, 1839-1845
- Galician slaughter, 1846
- Revolutions of 1848 in France and around Europe
- Newport Rising, political revolt in 1839 led by Chartists
- American Civil War, 1861–1865
- Taiping Rebellion, 1850-1864
- Paris Commune, 1871
- Pabna Peasant Uprisings, 1873–1876
- Johnson County War, 1889–1893
- Coal Wars, 1890–1930
- Donghak Peasant Revolution in Korea, 1893–94
- 1905 Russian Revolution
- 1907 Romanian Peasants' Revolt
- Mexican Revolution, 1910-1920
- Revolutions of 1917–1923, including the 1917 Russian Revolution and the German Revolution of 1918–1919
- Limerick Soviet in Ireland, 1919
- Seattle General Strike of 1919 in Seattle
- General Strike of 1919 in Spain
- Winnipeg General Strike, 1919
- Ruhr Uprising in Germany, 1920
- Kronstadt rebellion, 1921
- Battle of Blair Mountain, 1921
- Hamburg Uprising, 1923
- 1926 United Kingdom general strike
- 1934 West Coast waterfront strike
- Spanish Civil War, 1936–1939
- Tebhaga movement, 1946–1947
- Land Reform Movement (China), 1947–1950
- Communist insurgency in Myanmar, 1948–1988
- Nachole Uprising, 1949–1950
- Uprising of 1953 in East Germany
- Telangana Rebellion
- Cuban Revolution, 1953–1959
- Hungarian Revolution of 1956
- Poznań 1956 protests
- Naxalite-Maoist insurgency, 1967–present
- Protests of 1968, including May 68 in France and the Prague Spring
- Hot Autumn in Italy, 1969–70
- Communist rebellion in the Philippines, 1969–present
- 1972–1975 Bangladesh insurgency
- Several strikes by coal miners in the United Kingdom
  - 1969
  - 1972
  - 1974
  - 1984–85
- Winter of Discontent 1978–79
- Nicaraguan Revolution
- Poll tax riots 1990
- 1993 Russian constitutional crisis
- Maoist insurgency in Bangladesh, 1993–present
- 1999 Seattle WTO protests
- 2006 Oaxaca protests in Mexico
- Bolivarian Revolution
- 2008 Greek riots
- Kyrgyz Revolution of 2010
- Egyptian Revolution of 2011
- World Social Forum
- World Economic Forum
- Occupy Wall Street, 2011, and the Occupy movement
- Jasic Incident
- Rojava Revolution
- Protests against Rodrigo Duterte in the Philippines, 2016-2022
- Protests against Bongbong Marcos in the Philippines, 2021-present
- Yellow vests movement in France, 2018–2020
- 2019–2020 Chilean protests
- 2026 Bolivian Protests

== See also ==
- Class collaboration
- Class consciousness
- Classicide
- Classism
- Criticism of capitalism
- Critique of political economy
- Critique of work
- Economic stratification
- Social class
- Master-slave dialectic
