= L'Organisateur =

1819–20 French political magazine

L’Organisateur was a political magazine published in France between 1819 and 1820.

== History and profile ==
L'Organisateur was launched in 1819 by Henri de Saint-Simon (together with Augustin Thierry and Auguste Comte). The magazine's aim was to provide a forum for criticism of the French administration, allow a clear understanding of the past, and provide a basis for future policy. It was published only briefly: the first edition appeared in November 1819 and the last in February 1820. The murder in February 1820 of Charles Ferdinand, Duke of Berry led to accusations that Saint-Simon was guilty of moral collusion in the assassination, because in an article in the journal the duke had been named as someone France would not miss were he to die. Although Saint-Simon was found innocent it marked the end of the journal.
