= Social mobility in Japan =

Social mobility in Japan refers to the upward and downward movement for Japanese from one social class to another. The vertical mobility can be the change in social status between parents and children, which is intergenerational movement; as well as the change over the course of a lifetime, which is intragenerational movement.

== Post World War II context ==
After World War II, Japan's economy grew rapidly and stably. Japan achieved the high employment rate among developed countries as well as established a relatively equal class structure due to the rapid economy growth as well as its life-time employment system, progressive tax policies, and social security policies. Not only did the huge middle class establish the image of Japan's “affluent society”, but also maintained the long-term stability of the running Liberal Democratic Party in Japan, and verified the proposition that industrialization narrows down the social stratification. In the early 1970s, Japan even created the myth of “100 million all in the middle class” (“ichi oku sochuryu”), showing that social satisfaction reached a high level and the middle class awareness maintained long-term stability.

== Bubble economy impact ==
One factor that contributed to social mobility in Japan was the rapid economic growth between 1955 and 1985 with Japan's industrial structure changes. However, after the bubble economy burst in 1990, Japan entered a period of development stagnation known as the Lost Decade. Therefore, the occupational prestige, education levels, and assets among different social classes still existed and were not eliminated by industrialization. The trend of class stratification first appeared in the 1980s, and the main manifestations included the stagnation of equalized distribution, the fixation of employment patterns, and the narrowing gap between occupations. Therefore, wages and salaries were no longer the main variables in the economic stratification; instead, the difference in household assets became increasingly important in the economic stratification. During the bubble economy in the late 1980s, the huge wealth brought by the substantial appreciation of the Japanese yen was invested in stocks, securities, and real estate. The difference between financial assets and land prices rapidly expanded. Assets replaced wage income and became the determining factor of people's economic status and consumption patterns. In 1980, Murakami Yasusuke put forward the concept of "The Age of New Middle Mass Politics", where the middle class was defined as "middle level of standard of living", "conservative ideology", and a sign of social stability. However, middle class was largely influenced and destabilized by the bubble economy burst in 1990, causing the instability of the whole society.

== Impact of public policy on social mobility ==
Furthermore, the implementation of public policies including employment policies, tax policies, and social security policies also contributed to a relatively equal class structure in Japanese society. First, in the 1960s, Japan's total unemployment rate remained at around 1% and raised to 1.3% after 1973. During this period, due to the drastic changes in the industrial structure, industries and enterprises kept upgrading and the unemployment during this period mainly consisted of structural unemployment. The employment measures were mainly aimed at consolidating the life-time employment system, protecting the disadvantaged groups, and improving the labor market. Second, Japan's progressive tax system also resulted in the redistribution effect of personal income tax. The Japanese tax system was characterized by a high tax threshold and a steep increase in tax progressivity, creating high tax rate for high-income classes and low tax rate for low-income classes. Lastly, Japan's social security system also contributed to income redistribution effect. In 1961, Japan had established a comprehensive social security system – "national health insurance and pension schemes", when all Japanese people were finally covered. The most significant effect of redistribution under the social insurance schemes is the subsistence guarantee of low-income and disabled people.
