= Charles Dunoyer =

French economist (1786–1862)

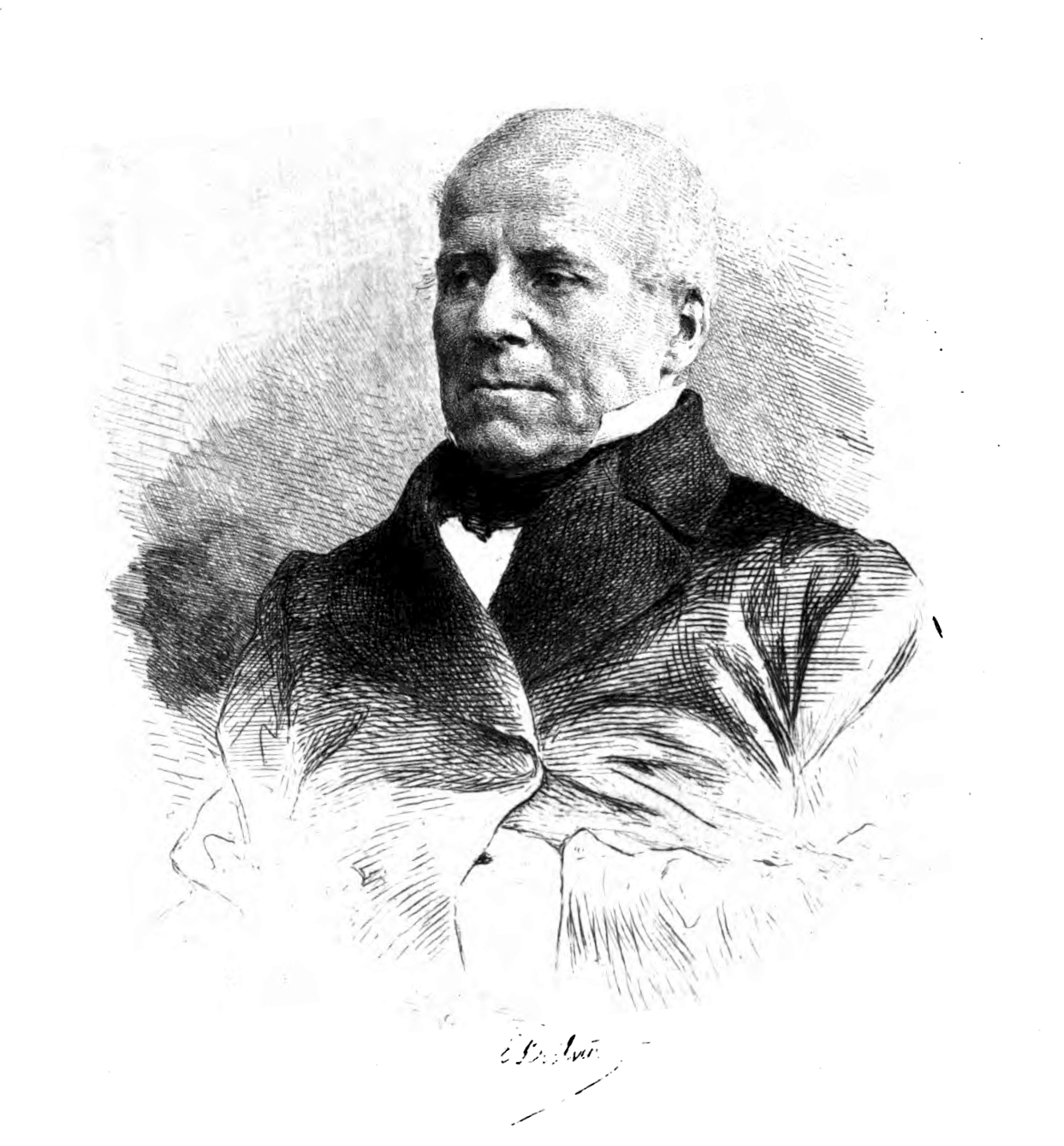
Charles Dunoyer

Charles Dunoyer Barthélemy-Charles-Pierre-Joseph Dunoyer de Segonzac (20 May 1786 – 4 December 1862), better known as Charles Dunoyer (French pronunciation: [ʃaʁl dynwaje]), was a French economist of the French Liberal School.

Dunoyer gave one of the earliest theories of economic cycle, building on the theory of periodic crises of Jean Charles Léonard de Sismondi and introducing the notion of the economy periodically cycling between two phases.

== Biography ==
Dunoyer was born in Carennac, Quercy (now in Lot). In 1814, he had founded together with Charles Comte the journal Le Censeur, a platform for liberal ideas. Dunoyer would also publish a variety of books on political economy, among them De la Liberté du travail (On the Freedom of Labour, 1845).

Dunoyer was an early member of the Société d'économie politique organized in 1842 by Pellegrino Rossi. He was a member of the Académie des Sciences morales et politiques of the Institut de France. He was also a member of the Conseil d'État of the Second Republic. While many know of the less than amiable relationship between Auguste Comte and Saint-Simon, there is much less knowledge of the more amiable twenty-five-year-long relationship between Auguste Comte and Charles Dunoyer. The latter relationship is discussed most fully by Leonard Liggio in "Charles Dunoyer and French Classical Liberalism".

Auguste Comte's intellectual biographer Mary Pickering also cites a review of Liggio's article when she too mentions this relationship. Dunoyer is also mentioned in the opening sentences of the entry on slavery by the Comtist John Kells Ingram in both the ninth, or scholar's edition, of the Encyclopædia Britannica and the later eleventh edition as well. Although he is one of the over 550 worthies cited in Auguste Comte's Calendar of Great Men (1849), Dunoyer is primarily cited as a substitute for Adam Smith.

Dunoyer died on 4 December 1862 in Paris.

== Bibliography ==
- L’Industrie et la morale considérées dans leurs rapports avec la liberté, 1825
- Nouveau traité d'économie sociale, ou Simple exposition des causes sous l'influence desquelles les hommes parviennent à user de leurs forces avec le plus de liberté, c'est-à-dire avec le plus de facilité et de puissance, Tome 1, 1830
- Nouveau traité d'économie sociale, ou Simple exposition des causes sous l'influence desquelles les hommes parviennent à user de leurs forces avec le plus de liberté, c'est-à-dire avec le plus de facilité et de puissance, Tome 2, 1830
- De la Liberté d’enseignement, 1844
- De la Liberté du travail, ou Simple exposé des conditions dans lesquelles les forces humaines s’exercent avec le plus de puissance, 1845
- La Révolution du 24 Février, 1848
- Rapport fait au nom de la section de morale sur le concours concernant les rapports de la morale et de l'économie politique, 1860
