= Sophie Bawr =

French writer, playwright, & composer (1773–1860)

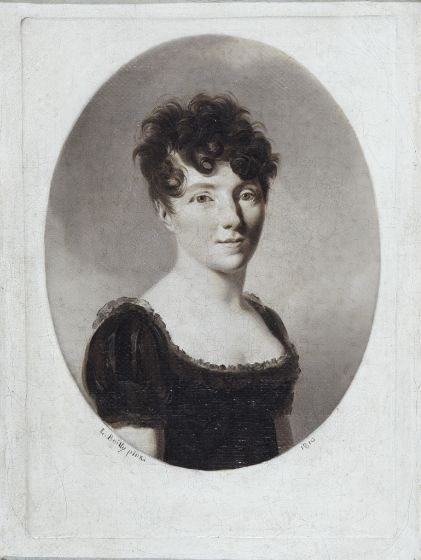
Alexandrine-Sophie de Bawr, 1810, by Louis-Léopold Boilly

Baroness Sophie de Bawr (8 October 1773 – 31 December 1860), born Alexandrine-Sophie Goury de Champgrand, was a French writer, playwright and composer, also known as "Comtesse de Saint-Simon", "Baronne de Bawr", and "M. François".

== Life ==
She was born in Paris, the illegitimate daughter of Marquis Charles-Jean de Champgrand and opera singer Madeline-Virginie Vian. Her godmother was Madeleine-Sophie Arnould. She was raised by her father, and studied music with André Grétry, Nicolas Roze and Adrien Boieldieu and singing with Pierre Garat and Jean Elleviou.

She secretly married a young aristocrat, Jules de Rohan-Rochefort, during the Terror who was executed soon after on the scaffold. Her son from this marriage died in infancy in 1797. After surviving the French Revolution, she supported herself by writing books, music and plays. In 1801 she married Claude-Henri de Saint-Simon. After a divorce, she married the Baltic German Baron de Bawr who died in an accident, leaving her again without financial support. However, she eventually received a pension from the French government. Her Suite d'un bal masqué was highly successful and received 246 performances between 1813 and 1869. She died in Paris. In 1853 she published her own memoir Mes Souvenirs

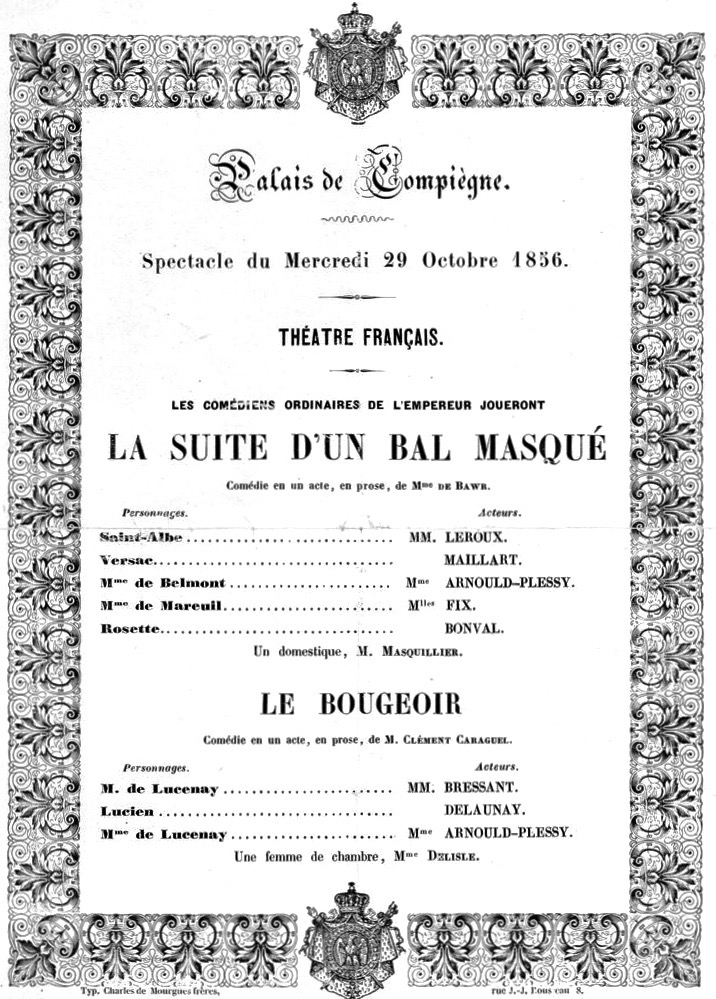
program for "La suite d’un bal masqué" von Sophie de Bawr (1813)

For her first three comedies, she used the pseudonym M. François.

== Selected works ==
Alexandrine-Sophie de Bawr wrote plays, musical theater, songs, several novels, educational texts and her own memoirs. Her nonfiction texts provide important historical information. Selected works include:

Music:

- Un quart d'heure de dépit, opéra comique, 1813 (unperformed)
- Les Chevaliers du lion, melodrama, 1804
- Léon, ou le château de Montaldi, melodrama, 1811

Plays:

- La Méprise, play, 1815
- Charlotte Brown, play, 1835
- La Suite d'un bal masqué, comic play, 1813

Literature:

- Histoire de la musique, in Encyclopédie des dames, 1823
- Soirées des jeunes personnes, 1852

memoir:

- Mes Souvenirs, 1853
