= Le Censeur =

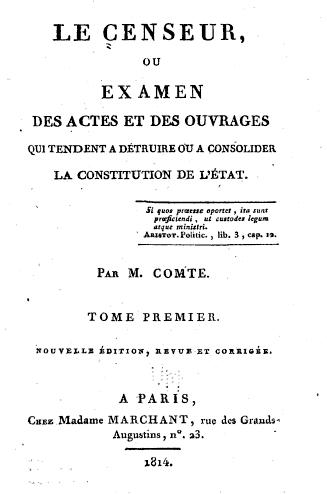
- Discipline: Sociology and Politics
- Language: French
- Edited by: Charles Dunoyer and Charles Comte

Publication details
- History: 1814-1815
- Publisher: Mme. Marchant., 1814 (France)

Standard abbreviations
- ISO 4: Censeur

Le Censeur was a French journal of institutional and legal reform, described sometimes as a Journal Industrialiste, founded in 1814 by Charles Dunoyer and Charles Comte as a platform for their liberal, radical, anti-Bourbon and anti-Bonapartist views. The journal's publication was interrupted due to political difficulties but it reappeared in 1817 under a new title Le Censeur Européen. It was discontinued in 1820 due to repressive press laws.

== Publication details ==
Le Censeur

- Vol. I June 1814
- Vol. II-X 10 November 1814- 6 September 1815

Le Censeur Europeen

- 12 Volumes - Autumn 1817 - 17 April 1819

== Notable contributors ==
- Jacques Nicolas Augustin Thierry
- Auguste Comte
- Jean-Baptiste Say
