= Charles Comte =

French lawyer, journalist and political writer (1782–1837)

François-Charles-Louis Comte (August 25, 1782–April 13, 1837) was a French lawyer, journalist and political writer.

== Biography ==
In 1814, Comte, along with Charles Dunoyer, founded with Le Censeur, a liberal journal. In 1820, he was found guilty of attacks against the King and went into exile in Switzerland, where as professor of natural law he taught at the University of Lausanne in Switzerland. Following comments made by Fredric Jean Witt, a revolutionary, to the Bavarian police and an intervention by the French police, Comte was forced to leave Switzerland. Comte took refuge in England for eighteen months where he became acquainted with Jeremy Bentham, but returned to France in 1825 and began contributing to the Revue Americaine. In 1827, he published Traité de législation (A Treatise on Law; 4 volumes, in-8) which outlined laws governing the development of companies and the reasons why development might be held back. The book established his reputation and earned him a Montyon Prize. As an economist, he followed the doctrines of Jean-Baptiste Say whose daughter he married. Comte was active in the opposition which led to the July Revolution of 1830 as he refused to pay taxes until Charles X revoked a series anti-liberal decrees and was elected a deputy in the Sarthe in 1831 and again in 1834. In 1832, he was elected to the Académie des Sciences Morales et Politiques.

== Quotes ==
Some quotes which give a good feel for his work:

Newspapers could be of great utility, but the great importance which they attach to simple literary discussions, the indifference they have for anything which smacks of legislation, and the habit they have acquired of adulation (of the government), prevents one from hoping that they will busy themselves in enlightening citizens of their true interests. What they do not do, I propose to undertake.

The revolution which brought about in France the fall of the Imperial government, without changing at all the direction of my ideas, forced me to choose a means of publication different from that which I had at first proposed. It seemed to me that in treating in succession questions of politics or legislation which circumstances threw up I would achieve my aim most surely and promptly. Observations applied to those events which one witnesses have greater impact than those observations made from a distance. The freedom to publicly present one's opinions, which the previous government had completely destroyed, was eventually proclaimed and it was imperative to take advantage of it. Because it is the same of liberty and power, one runs the great risk of losing it if one does not seize it the very instant when it appears.

An opponent of monarchy, Comte nevertheless saw how even a democratic government retained certain things in common with the old order, saying:

What must never be lost sight of is that a public functionary, in his capacity as functionary, produces absolutely nothing; that, on the contrary, he exists only on the products of the industrious class; and that he can consume nothing that has not been taken from the producers.
