= Henri de Saint-Simon =

French early socialist theorist (1760–1825)

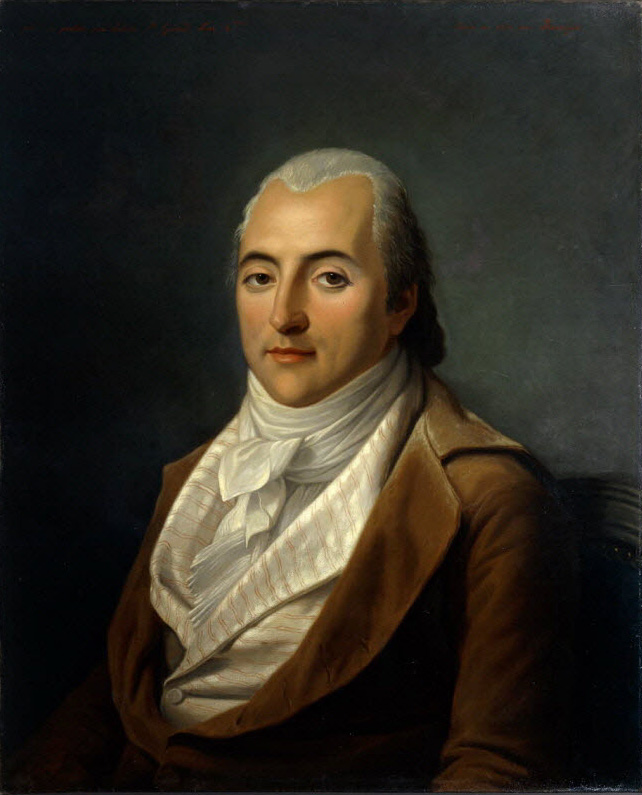
- Posthumous portrait (1848); after Adélaïde Labille-Guiard
- Born: Claude Henri de Rouvroy, comte de Saint-Simon; 17 October 1760; Paris, Kingdom of France
- Died: 19 May 1825 (aged 64); Paris, Kingdom of France
- Resting place: Père Lachaise Cemetery

Philosophical work
- Era: 19th-century philosophy
- Region: Western philosophy
- School: Saint-Simonianism; Socialism; Utopian socialism
- Notable students: Auguste Comte; Augustin Thierry
- Main interests: Political philosophy
- Notable ideas: The distinction between the productive industrial class and the idling class

Claude Henri de Rouvroy, Comte de Saint-Simon (/sænsiːˈmɒn/; French: [klod ɑ̃ʁi də ʁuvʁwa kɔ̃t də sɛ̃ simɔ̃]; 17 October 1760 – 19 May 1825), better known as Henri de Saint-Simon (French: [ɑ̃ʁi də sɛ̃ simɔ̃]), was a French political, economic and socialist theorist and businessman whose thought had a substantial influence on politics, economics, sociology and the philosophy of science. He was a younger relative of the famous memoirist the Duc de Saint-Simon.

Saint-Simon created a political and economic ideology known as Saint-Simonianism that claimed that the needs of an industrial class, which he also referred to as the working class, needed to be recognised and fulfilled to have an effective society and an efficient economy. Unlike conceptions within industrialising societies of a working class being manual laborers alone, Saint-Simon's late-18th-century conception of this class included all people engaged in what he saw as productive work that contributed to society, such as businesspeople, managers, scientists, bankers, and manual labourers, amongst others.

Saint-Simon believed the primary threat to the needs of the industrial class was what he defined as the idling class: a tier of society that included able-bodied persons who, instead of using their labour to benefit the social and economic orders, preferred what he perceived as a parasitic life avoiding work. Saint-Simon stressed a three-pronged recognition of the merits of the individual, social hierarchy, and the wider economy, such as hierarchical, merit-based organisations of managers and scientists; those at the top of the hierarchies would be decision-makers in government. Saint-Simon condemned any intrusion of government into the economy beyond ensuring productive working conditions and reducing idleness in society. Saint-Simon endorsed what critics have described as authoritarian or totalitarian means to achieve his goals, saying that opponents of his proposed reforms should be "treated like cattle".

Saint-Simon's conceptual recognition of the merits of broad socioeconomic contribution and Enlightenment-era valorization of scientific knowledge inspired and influenced utopian socialism, utilitarian political theorist John Stuart Mill, anarchism (through its founder, Pierre-Joseph Proudhon), and Marxism—Karl Marx and Friedrich Engels identified Saint-Simon as an inspiration for their ideas and classified him among the utopian socialists. Saint-Simon's views also influenced 20th-century sociologist and economist Thorstein Veblen, including Veblen's influential school of institutional economics.

== Biography ==
=== Early years ===
Henri de Saint-Simon was born in Paris as a French aristocrat, the son of Balthazar Henri de Rouvroy de Saint-Simon, Marquis de Sandricourt (1721–1783) and his wife and cousin, Blanche Isabelle de Rouvroy de Saint-Simon (b. 1737), lady-in-waiting of Marie Joséphine of Savoy, Countess of Provence. His grandfather's cousin had been the Duke of Saint-Simon. His younger sister Marie Louise de Rouvroy de Saint-Simon (1763–1834) was mother-in-law of Princess Maria Christina of Saxony, Dowager Princess of Carignano.

From his youth, Saint-Simon was highly ambitious. He ordered his valet to wake him every morning with, "Remember, monsieur le comte, that you have great things to do." Among his early schemes was one to connect the Atlantic and the Pacific oceans by a canal, and another to construct a canal from Madrid to the sea.

During the American Revolution, Saint-Simon joined the Americans, believing that their revolution signaled the beginning of a new era. He fought alongside the Marquis de Lafayette between 1779 and 1783, and took part in the siege of Yorktown under the command of General George Washington. Saint-Simon was captured and imprisoned by British forces during the end of his service, and upon his release, returned to France to study engineering and hydraulics at the Ecole de Mézières.

At the beginning of the French Revolution in 1789, Saint-Simon quickly endorsed the revolutionary ideals of liberty, equality and fraternity. In the early years of the revolution, Saint-Simon devoted himself to organizing a large industrial structure in order to found a scientific school of improvement. He needed to raise some funds to achieve his objectives, which he did by land speculation. This was only possible in the first few years of the revolution because of the growing instability of the political situation in France, which prevented him from continuing his financial activities and indeed put his life at risk. Saint-Simon and Talleyrand planned to profiteer during the Terror by buying the Cathedral of Notre-Dame, stripping its roof of metal, and selling the metal for scrap. Saint-Simon was imprisoned on suspicion of engaging in counter-revolutionary activities. He was released in 1794 at the end of the Terror. After he recovered his freedom, Saint-Simon found himself immensely rich due to currency depreciation, but his fortune was subsequently stolen by his business partner. Thenceforth he decided to devote himself to political studies and research. After the establishment of the Ecole Polytechnique in 1794, a school established to train young men in the arts of sciences and industry and funded by the state, Saint-Simon became involved with the new school.

=== Life as a working adult ===
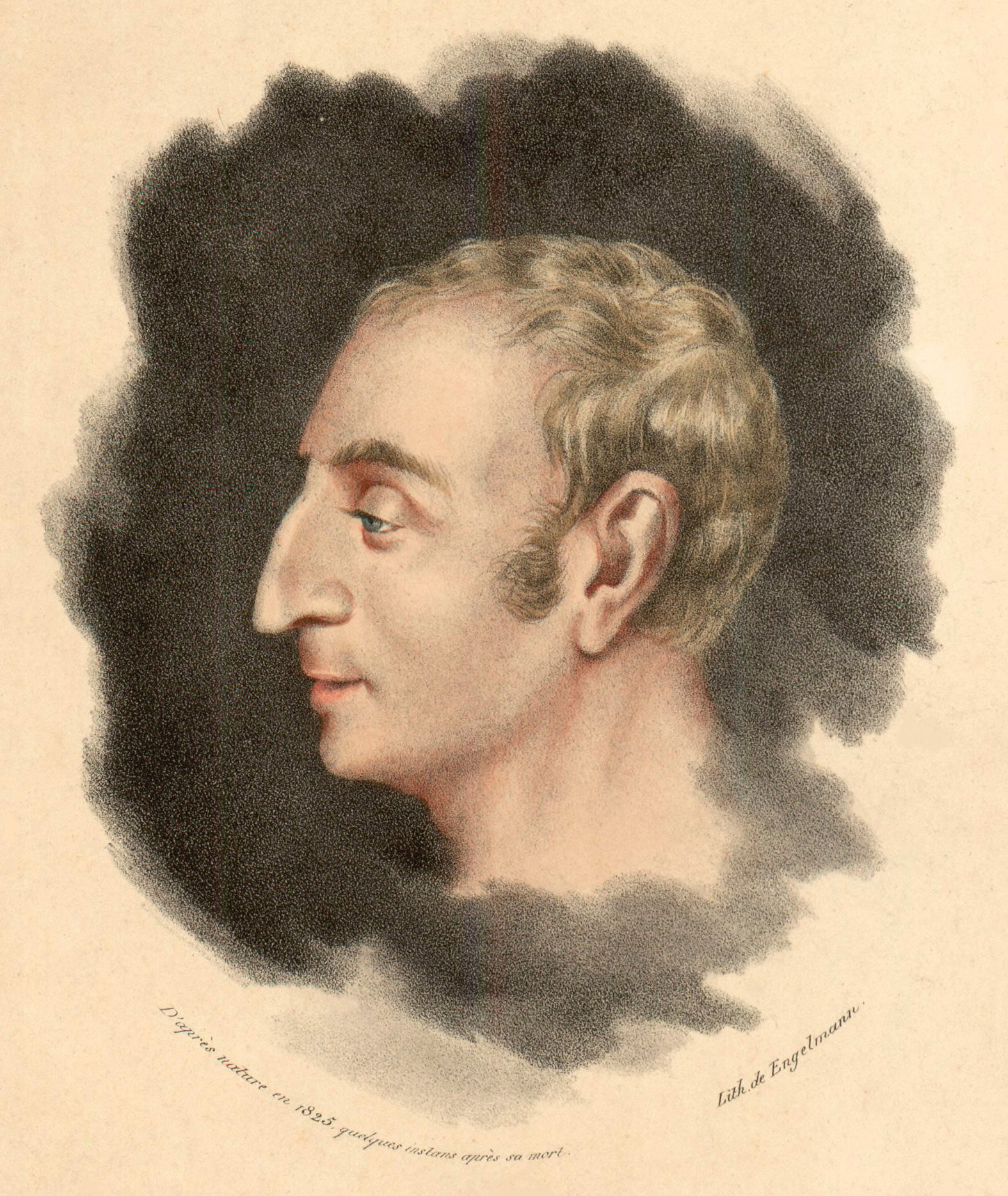
Henri de Saint-Simon, portrait from the first quarter of the 19th century by Godefroy Engelmann

When he was nearly 40 he went through a varied course of study and experiment to enlarge and clarify his view of things. One of these experiments was an unhappy marriage in 1801 to Alexandrine-Sophie Goury de Champgrand, undertaken so that he might have a literary salon. After a year, the marriage was dissolved by mutual consent. The result of his experiments was that he found himself completely impoverished, and lived in penury for the remainder of his life. The first of his numerous writings, mostly scientific and political, was Lettres d'un habitant de Genève, which appeared in 1802. In this first work, he called for the creation of a religion of science with Isaac Newton as a saint.

Saint-Simon's earliest publications, such as his Introduction aux travaux scientifiques du XIXe siècle (Introduction to scientific discoveries of the 19th century (1803) and his Mémoire sur la science de l'homme (Notes on the study of man) (1813), (the latter of which is a eulogy to Napoleon), demonstrate his faith in science as a means to regenerate society.

A few years into his writing career, Saint-Simon found himself ruined and was forced to work for a living. After a few attempts to recover his money from his former partner, he received financial support from Diard, a former employee, and was able to publish in 1807 his second book, Introduction aux travaux scientifiques du XIX siècle. Diard died in 1810 and Saint-Simon found himself poor again, and this time also in poor health. He was sent to a sanatorium in 1813, but with financial help from relatives, he had time to recover his health and gain some intellectual recognition in Europe. In February 1821 Du système industriel appeared, and in 1823–1824 Catéchisme des industriels.

Around 1814 he wrote the essay "On Reconstruction of the European Community" and sent it to the Congress of Vienna. He proposed a European kingdom, building on France and the United Kingdom.

For his last decade, Saint-Simon concentrated on themes of political economy. Together with Auguste Comte, (then only a teenager), Saint-Simon projected a society bypassing the changes of the French Revolution, in which science and industry would take the moral and temporal power of medieval theocracy. In his last work however, Le Nouveau Christianisme (The New Christianity) (1825), Saint-Simon reverted to more traditional ideas of renewing society through Christian brotherly love. He died shortly after its publication.

=== Suicide attempt ===
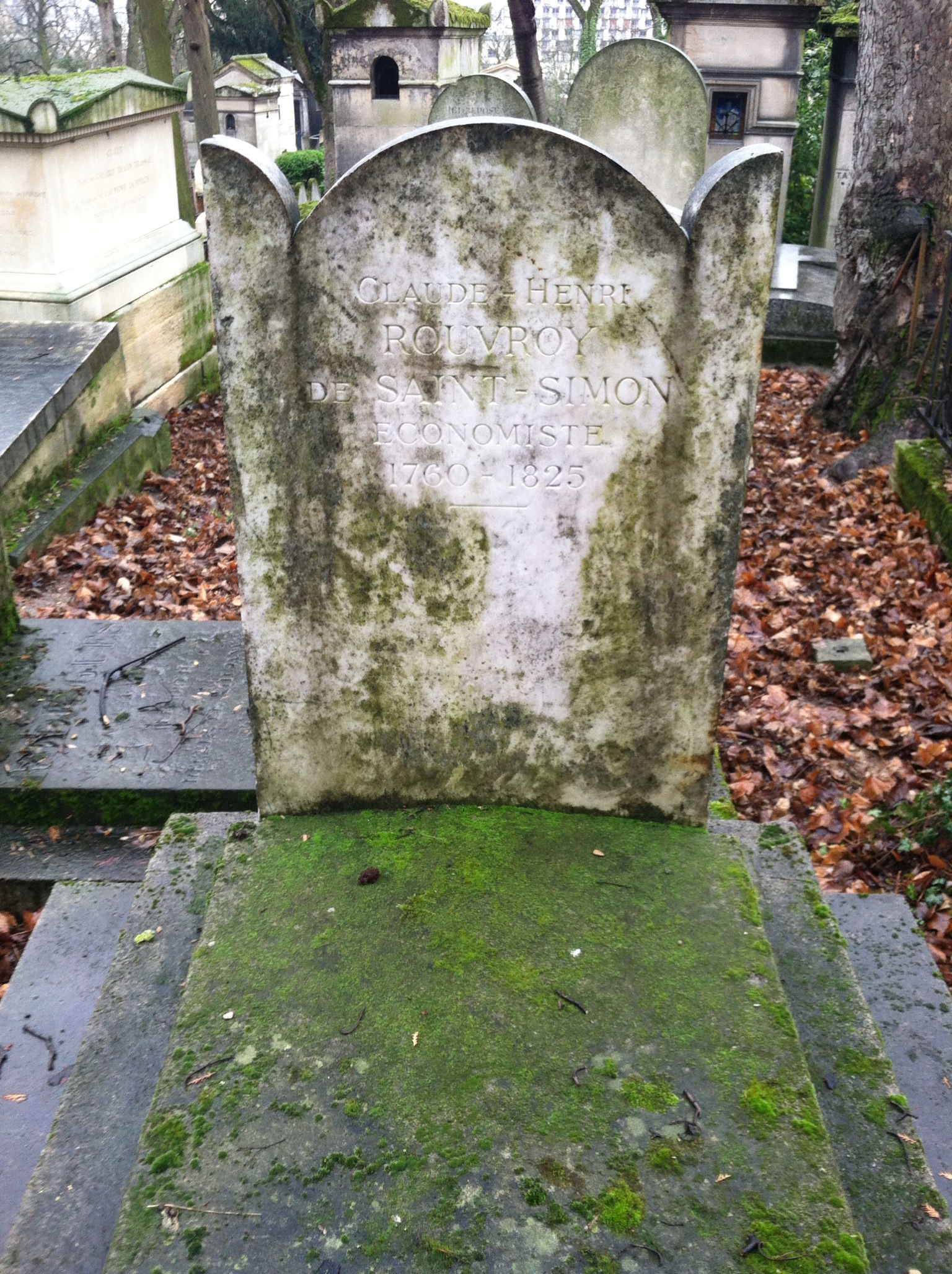
Saint-Simon's grave in Père Lachaise Cemetery, Paris

On 9 March 1823, disappointed by the lack of results of his writing (he had hoped they would guide society towards social improvement), he attempted suicide in despair. Remarkably, he shot himself in the head six times without succeeding, losing his sight in one eye.

=== Death ===
Two years after his suicide attempt, Saint-Simon died on 19 May 1825 and was buried in Le Père Lachaise Cemetery in Paris, France.

=== Legacy ===
After Saint-Simon's death in 1825, his disciples formalized his ideas into a "Saint-Simonian" movement, emphasizing a planned economy, the abolition of inheritance, and the emancipation of women. He is widely regarded as the founder of French socialism and a major early progenitor of sociology. His vision of a scientifically organized society led by "industrials" (productive classes including workers, scientists, and engineers) significantly influenced the development of 19th and 20th-century political thought.

Marx and Engels radicalised Saint-Simon's concepts of class and class conflict. They credited him with perceiving both the French Revolution and the Reign of Terror as a "class war" for recognizing that economic conditions are the basis of political institutions by Robespierre. While Marx and Engels admired his "breadth of view", they critiqued him for believing that social change could be achieved through peaceful persuasion of elites rather than proletarian revolution. The Communist Manifesto was published in London by 1848, commissioned by the Communist League, following the revolution in France, the provisional government invited Marx back. The Central Authority of the Communist League was officially reconstituted in Paris at this time.

== Ideas ==
=== Industrialism ===
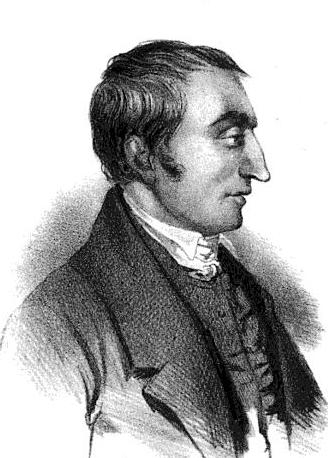
Posthumous 1848 portrait by Charles Baugniet

In 1817 Saint-Simon published a manifesto called the "Declaration of Principles" in his work titled L'Industrie ("Industry"). The declaration was about the principles of an ideology called industrialism that called for the creation of an industrial society led by people within what he defined as the industrial class. The industrial class, also referred to as the working class, was defined as including all people engaged in productive work that contributed to society, emphasizing scientists and industrialists, but including engineers, businesspeople, managers, bankers, manual workers, and others.

Saint-Simon said the primary threat to the needs of the industrial class was another class he referred to as the idling class, which included able people who preferred to be parasitic and benefit from the work of others while seeking to avoid doing work. He saw the origins of this parasitic activity by idlers in what he regarded as the natural laziness of humanity. He believed the principal economic roles of government were to ensure that productive activity in the economy is unhindered and to reduce idleness in society.

In the Declaration, Saint-Simon strongly criticized any expansion of government intervention into the economy beyond these two principal economic roles, saying that when the government goes beyond these roles, it becomes a "tyrannical enemy of industry" and that the industrial economy will decline as a consequence of such excessive government intervention. Saint-Simon stressed the need for recognition of the merit of the individual and the need for hierarchy of merit in society and in the economy, such as society having hierarchical merit-based organizations of managers and scientists to be the decision-makers in government. His views were radical for his time. He built on Enlightenment ideas which challenged church doctrine and the older regime with the idea of progress from industry and science.

Heavily influenced by the absence of social privilege he saw in the early United States, Saint-Simon renounced his aristocratic title and came to favor a form of meritocracy, becoming convinced that science was the key to progress and that it would be possible to develop a society based on objective scientific principles. He claimed that feudal society in France and elsewhere needed to be dissolved and transformed into an industrial society. As such, he invented the conception of the industrial society.

Saint-Simon's economic views and ideas were influenced by Adam Smith whom Saint-Simon deeply admired, and referred to him in praise as "the immortal Adam Smith". He shared with Smith the belief that taxes needed to be much reduced from what they were then in order to have a more just industrial system. Saint-Simon desired the minimization of government intervention into the economy to prevent disruption of productive work. He emphasized more emphatically than Smith that state administration of the economy was generally parasitic and hostile to the needs of production. Like Adam Smith, Saint-Simon's model of society emulated the scientific methods of astronomy, and said "The astronomers only accepted those facts which were verified by observation; they chose the system which linked them best, and since that time, they have never led science astray.".

Saint-Simon reviewed the French Revolution and regarded it as an upheaval driven by economic change and class conflict. In his analysis, he believed that the solution to the problems that led to the French Revolution would be the creation of an industrial society, where a hierarchy of merit and respect for productive work would be the basis of society, while ranks of hereditary and military hierarchy would lessen in importance in society because they were not capable to lead a productive society.

=== Racial views ===
Saint-Simon believed that Europeans were superior. In the work De la réorganization de la société européenne, written with Augustin Thierry and published in 1814, Saint-Simon advocated that the united Europe which he envisioned should try to colonize the rest of the world: "To colonize the world with the European race, which is superior to every other race: to make the world accessible and habitable like Europe—such is the sort of enterprise by which the European Parliament should continually keep Europe active and happy." Writing in Introduction aux œuvres scientifiques du XIXe siècle, Saint-Simon states that he does not believe negroes to be equal to the Europeans for physiological reasons. In Lettres, he writes: "The revolutionaries applied the principles of equality to negroes. If they had consulted the physiologists they would have learned that the negro, because of his basic physical structure, is not susceptible, even with the same education, of rising to the intellectual level of Europeans." Jan Eijking writes that "Saint-Simon's understanding of a neutral, technocratic international sphere took existing social, economic, and racial hierarchies for granted".

=== Religious views ===
Prior to the publication of the Nouveau Christianisme, Saint-Simon had not concerned himself with theology. In Nouveau Christianisme, Saint-Simon presupposes a belief in God; his object in the treatise is to reduce Christianity to its simple and essential elements. He does this by clearing it of what he thought to be the dogmas and other defects that had come to define the Catholic and Protestant forms of Christianity.

Saint-Simon posited a comprehensive formula for a "new Christianity": "The whole of society ought to strive towards the amelioration of the moral and physical existence of the poorest class; society ought to organize itself in the way best adapted for attaining this end."

== Influence ==
Saint-Simon's thought exerted significant influence upon French and European technocratic thought, the development of technocratic internationalism, as well as major industrial and financial projects including the Suez Canal, the Channel Tunnel, the Crédit Mobilier, and the Chemins de fer de Paris à Lyon et à la Méditerranée. Following Saint-Simon's death in 1825, his followers began to differ as to how to promulgate his ideas. The most acclaimed disciple of Saint-Simon was Auguste Comte.

In 1831 Barthélemy Prosper Enfantin and Amand Bazard purchased the newspaper Le Globe as the official organ for their revolutionary fraternity Friends of the Truth. Initially both men were supposed to be co-leaders naming themselves Supreme Fathers. However, Bazard left the group as it became increasingly ritualistic and religiously minded with Enfantin founding a community at Ménilmontant where he decried marriage as tyranny, promoted free love, declared himself "chosen by God", and began predicting that a "female Messiah" would soon save humanity. Enfantin would go on to organize an expedition of the disciples to Constantinople, and then to Egypt, where he influenced the creation of the Suez Canal.

"The school of Saint-Simon, while holding that the concept of class would some day cease to be characterized by any economic attribute, did not look for a future without class distinctions. The Saint-Simonians dreamed of the creation of a new hierarchy which was to be founded, not upon the privileges of birth, but upon acquired privileges. This class was to consist of 'the most vital, the most intelligent and the strongest, the living personification of the threefold progress of society,' and 'capable of directing it in the widest course.' At the head of their socialist state the Saint-Simonians desired to place those whom they termed 'hommes généraux,' who would be able to prescribe for each individual his quantum of social labor, the individual's special aptitudes being taken into account in this connection; here it is obvious that dependence must be placed upon the discretion of these supermen."

— Robert Michels on the apparent elitism present within the utopian socialism of Saint-Simonianism, Political Parties

Gustave d'Eichthal was a sympathiser of the Saint-Simonian movement who developed Saint-Simonian notions practically and involved himself in the development of the French economy, founding a number of leading concerns including the Suez Canal Company, founded by Saint-Simonian sympathiser Ferdinand de Lesseps, and the bank Crédit Mobilier, which was established by the Pereire brothers who had been members of the Saint-Simonian movement. It has also been noted that Saint-Simonian ideas exerted a significant influence on new religious movements such as Spiritualism and Occultism since the 1850s. Karl Marx considered the Saint-Simonians to be the "patriarchs of socialism".

French feminist and socialist writer Flora Tristan (1803–1844) claimed that Mary Wollstonecraft, author of A Vindication of the Rights of Woman, anticipated Saint-Simon's ideas by a generation.

Karl Marx identified Saint-Simon as being among whom he called the "utopian socialists", though historian Alan Ryan regards certain followers of Saint-Simon, rather than Saint-Simon himself, as being responsible for the rise of utopian socialism that based itself upon Saint-Simon's ideas. Ryan also distinguishes between Saint-Simon's conceptions and Marxism's, as Saint-Simon did not promote independent working-class organization and leadership as a solution to capitalist societal problems, nor did he adhere to the Marxist definition of the working class as excluded by fundamental private property law from control over the means of production. Unlike Marx, Saint-Simon did not regard class relations, with respect to the means of production, to be an engine of socio-economic dynamics but rather the form of management. Furthermore, Saint-Simon was not critical of capitalists as exclusive owners, collaborators, controllers, and decision-makers. Rather, he regarded capitalists as an important component of the "industrial class". Ryan further suggests that by the 1950s it was clear that Saint-Simon had presaged the "modern" understanding of industrial society. Economist Don Lavoie described Saint-Simon as part of an authoritarian current in socialist thought, by promoting a "deliberate reconstruction of society" which was "comprehensively planned" and which, which by necessity, required mass compulsion to achieve its goals.

According to Fr. Cyril Martindale, Robert Hugh Benson got the idea of his dystopian science fiction novel about the Antichrist, published in 1908 as Lord of the World, from his friend and literary mentor Frederick Rolfe, who also introduced Monsignor Benson to the writings of Saint-Simon. According to Fr. Martindale, as Benson read Saint-Simon's writings, "A vision of a dechristianised civilisation, sprung from the wrecking of the French ancien régime, arose before him and he listened to Mr. Rolfe's suggestion that he should write a book on Antichrist."

== Works ==
Saint-Simon wrote various accounts of his views:

- Lettres d'un habitant de Genève à ses contemporains. 1803 – via Gallica.
- De la réorganisation de la société européenne (1814)
- L'Industrie (1816–1817)
- Le Politique (1819)
- L'Organisateur (1819–1820)
- Du système industriel (1822)
- Catéchisme des industriels (1823–1824)
- Nouveau Christianisme (1825)
- An edition of the works of Saint-Simon and Enfantin was published by the survivors of the sect (47 vols., Paris, 1865–1878).

== See also ==
- Pierre Leroux
- Positivism
- Society of the Friends of Truth
