= Economic stratification =

Existence of economic strata

Social connectedness to people of higher income levels is a strong predictor of upward income mobility. However, data shows substantial social segregation correlating with economic income groups.

Economic stratification refers to the condition within a society where social classes are separated, or stratified, along economic lines. Various economic strata or levels are clearly manifest. While in any system individual members will have varying degrees of wealth, economic stratification typically refers to the condition where there are meaningful gaps between the wealth controlled by various groups, and few instances in the transitional regions.

Economic stratification should not be confused with the related concept, economic inequality. This deals with the range of wealth, rather than the existence of distinct strata. Economic inequality and economic stratification can coincide, of course.

== Causation ==
=== Causal conditions ===
The causal conditions for stratification include:

- Unequal distribution of resources (assets and income)
- Asymmetrical personal ability (Education, Genetic Factors)
- Cultural priorities
- State institutions and activities

The effects that stratification produces in society as a whole can be significant. They include:

- Inefficient economic cycling
- Increasing corruption of judicial and legislative processes
- Dysfunctional handling of social and political changes

In extreme cases, the social fabric can break down and result in open class warfare such as what happened during the French Revolution, the Russian Revolution, and many others.

=== Causative factors ===
Many of these effects also act as causative factors. This induces progressively greater stratification unless action is taken to limit a runaway condition. Corruption of the feedback mechanism is the most dangerous threat to any balanced system, since it can lead to economic oscillations of increasing magnitude until runaway inflation or depression results. A historical example of runaway stratification is the Great Depression of the late 1920s and 1930s. As monopolies gained increasing power and influence, the working class gradually lost purchasing power until other factors, such as the bank failures, coincided to produce an economic collapse. Such collapses can occur because the circulation of capital (M1) in such systems becomes highly dependent upon continually increasing apparent quantities of M2. A percentage of M2 is continually being converted into M1 until a point is reached in which the rate of conversion of M2 into M1 cannot be sustained by the available quantity of M1. In the case of the Great Depression, M2 refers to stocks and bank notes. When it became apparent that the valuation of M2 exceeded the supply of M1, a panic ensued to convert M2 to M1, resulting in the rapid apparent devaluation of M2, and the Wall Street Crash of 1929. In the case where M1 is increased to support the increasing conversion of M2 into M1, inflation increases until the physical supply of M1 becomes unwieldy and the result is also economic collapse, as was the case in Germany during the same period.

It is apparent that under these conditions, neither increasing the supply of M1 nor decreasing it (relative to M2) can effectively prevent an economic collapse. Therefore, it can be postulated that economic stratification itself ultimately results in economic collapse of one degree or another. An effective legislative process can prolong the period between collapses, but since one of the effects of stratification is the degradation of this process, it becomes a self accelerating process.

== See also ==
- Banana republic
