= Augustin Thierry =

French historian (1795–1856)

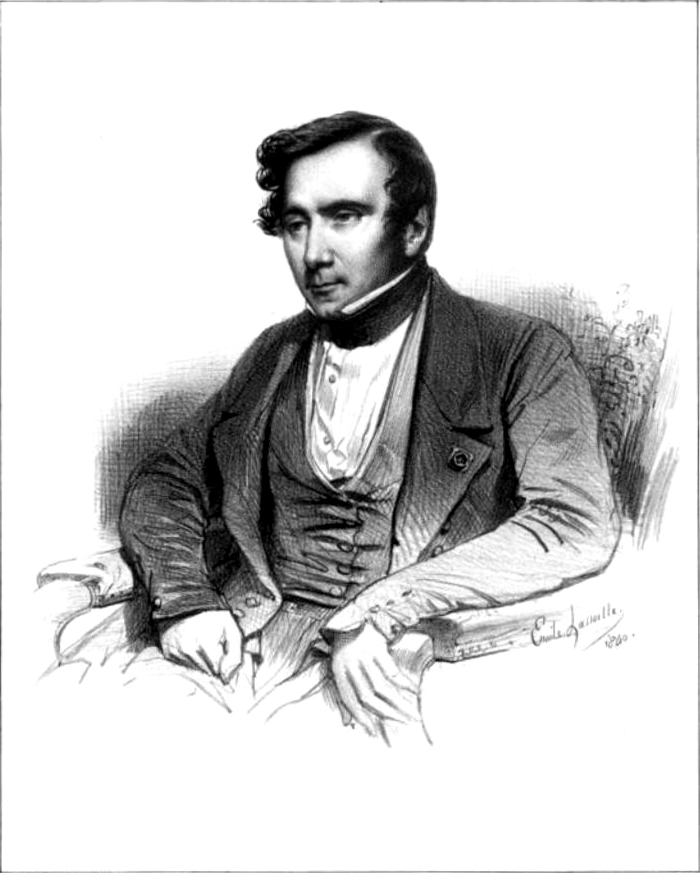
- Born: Jacques Nicolas Augustin Thierry; 10 May 1795; Blois, France
- Died: 22 May 1856 (aged 61); Paris, France

Education
- Academic advisor: Henri de Saint-Simon

Philosophical work
- Era: Modern philosophy: 19th-century philosophy
- Region: Western philosophy: French philosophy
- School: Romanticism

Jacques Nicolas Augustin Thierry (French: [tjɛʁi]; 10 May 1795 – 22 May 1856) was a French historian. Although originally a follower of Henri de Saint-Simon, he later developed his own approach to history. A committed liberal, his approach to history often introduced a Romantic interpretation, although he did engage in research of primary sources. He nevertheless was recognised as a significant historian of the evolution of communal governance.

== Early life ==
He was born in Blois, Loir-et-Cher, and was the elder brother of Amédée Thierry. He had no advantages of birth or fortune, but was distinguished at the Blois Grammar School, and entered the École Normale Supérieure in 1811. In 1813 he was sent as a professor to Compiègne, but stayed there a very short time.

== Career ==
Thierry enthusiastically embraced the ideals of the French Revolution and Saint Simon's vision of an ideal future society. He briefly became Saint-Simon's secretary and "adopted son". Initially he had been put off by what he perceived as the elitism of Mémoire sur le science de l'homme. However, by 1814, having no teaching position he accepted a position as Saint-Simon's secretary. He collaborated with Saint-Simon on De la réorganisation de la société européenne – a tract calling for the unification of Europe on the basis of a single constitution. However, by 1817 Thierry relinquished this position to Auguste Comte. But whereas most of Saint-Simon's followers applied his theories to present-day matters of political economy, Thierry trod an independent path and turned to history instead.

Thierry was also inspired by Romantic literature, such as Chateaubriand's Les Martyrs, and Walter Scott's novels. Though Thierry did not actually write romances, his conception of history recognised the dramatic element (for instance, Les Martyrs dramatises the clash of the Roman Empire with Early Christianity).

Thierry's main ideas on the Germanic invasions, the Norman Conquest, the formation of the Communes, the gradual ascent of the nations towards free government and parliamentary institutions, are set forth in the articles he contributed to the Censeur européen (1817–20), and later in his Lettres sur l'histoire de France (1820). From Claude Charles Fauriel he learned to use primary sources; and by the aid of the Latin chronicles and the collection of Anglo-Saxon laws, he wrote Histoire de la Conquête de l'Angleterre par les Normands (History of the Conquest of England by the Normans), the appearance of which was greeted with great enthusiasm (1825). It was written in a style at once precise and picturesque, and was dominated by a theory of Anglo-Saxon liberty resisting the invasions of northern barbarians, and eventually reviving in the parliamentary monarchy. Notably, it is in this work that Thierry voices the belief that Robin Hood was a leader of the Anglo-Saxon resistance. His artistic talent as a writer makes the weaknesses and deficiencies of his scholarship less obvious. Thierry's contemporary, François Guizot, praised Histoire de la Conquête de l'Angleterre as portraying "the motives, the inclinations and impulses that stir men into action in a state of life bordering on the savage... in a truly masterly manner," and said that "[t]here is nowhere else to be found so correct a likeness of what a barbarian was, or of his course of life." This work, the preparation of which had required several years of hard work, cost Thierry his eyesight; in 1826 he was obliged to engage secretaries and eventually became quite blind. Notwithstanding, he continued to write.

In 1827, he republished his Lettres sur l'histoire de France, adding fifteen new letters in which he described some of the more striking episodes in the history of the rise of the medieval communes. The chronicles of the 11th and 12th centuries, along with a few communal charters, provided him with material for a solid work. For this reason, his work on the communes has not become as outdated as his Norman Conquest. However, he was too prone to generalize from the facts presented by a few notable cases occurring in a small part of France, which helped spread mistaken ideas among the public—and even among professional historians—about one of the most complex problems relating to the social origins of France.

Thierry ardently supported the July Revolution and the triumph of liberal ideas; at this time, too, his brother Amédée was appointed prefect, and he went to live with him for four years. He now re-edited, under the title of Dix ans d'études historiques, his first essays in the Censeur européen and Le Courrier français (1834), and composed his Récits des temps mérovingiens, in which he vividly presented some of the stories of Gregory of Tours. These Récits appeared first in the Revue des deux mondes; when collected in volume form, they were preceded by long Considerations sur l'histoire de France.

From 7 May 1830, Thierry had already been a member of the Académie des Inscriptions et Belles Lettres; in 1841, on the motion of Villemain, the Académie Française awarded him the first Prix Gobert. He continued to receive this prize for the next fifteen years. Moreover, he had been asked to edit a volume of the series Documents inédits containing a selection of acts bearing on the history of the Third Estate. Helped by collaborators (including Bourquelot and Louandre) he compiled, in four volumes, Recueil des monuments inédits de l'histoire du Tiers Etat (1850–70), which, however, bear only on the northern part of France. The preface appeared afterwards in a separate volume under the title of Histoire du Tiers Etat.

== Later years and legacy ==
To Thierry belongs the credit for inaugurating in France the really critical study of the communal institutions. The last years of his life were clouded by domestic griefs and by illness. In 1844 he lost his wife, Julie de Querengal, who had been a capable and devoted collaborator in his studies. The Revolution of 1848 inflicted on him a final blow by overturning the regime of the Liberal bourgeoisie, whose triumph he had hailed and justified as the necessary outcome of the whole course of French history. Thierry began to abandon the strict rationalism that had hitherto estranged him from the Catholic Church. When Catholic writers criticised the "historical errors" in his writings he promised to correct them, and in the final edition of his Histoire de la Conquête his severe judgments of Vatican policies are eliminated. Though he did not renounce his liberal friends, he sought the company of enlightened priests, and just before his death seems disposed to reentering the Church. He died in Paris in 1856.

== Works ==
- 1814 De la réorganisation de la société européenne (by Claude Henri de Saint-Simon and by A. Thierry, his pupil) Paris: Adrian Égron
- 1825 Histoire de la Conquête de l'Angleterre par les Normands (History of the Conquest of England by the Normans)

== See also ==
- Jules Michelet
- Henri Martin (historian)
