= List of recurring Albert Campion characters =

This is a list of the recurring characters in the Albert Campion novels and short stories by Margery Allingham.

== Central characters ==
- Albert Campion describes himself (in Police at the Funeral) as a professional adventurer. He is a member of an aristocratic family but has chosen to follow his unconventional career under a pseudonym. He is the main character in the series.
- Magersfontein Lugg is Campion's manservant. He retired from a previous career as a burglar when he "lost his figure". He is involved in most of Campion's adventures.

== Police Officers ==
- Stanislaus Oates of Scotland Yard first appears in Mystery Mile. At that time he is an inspector but he is promoted as the series goes on, becoming chief of Scotland Yard by More Work for the Undertaker. Campion is godfather to his son.
- Charles Luke (normally called Charlie) is introduced in More Work for the Undertaker as a divisional detective inspector. He comes from the East End of London, and speaks in a Cockney accent; he is also notable for using his hands and face to describe whatever he is talking about. In The Beckoning Lady he falls in love with Prunella Scroop-Dory, the last of an old aristocratic family, to the dismay of Campion who considers that she was brought up to live in a world that no longer exists. She dies in childbirth before the start of The China Governess, after which Luke's mother takes care of him and his baby daughter.

== Campion's family ==
- Amanda Fitton first appears as a seventeen-year-old in Sweet Danger. The story of that book revolves around her brother Hal's attempts to regain his title, Earl of Pontisbright. Her parents are dead and she lives at the crumbling house of Pontisbright Mill with her brother Hal and sister Mary, and her American aunt Harriet Huntingforest ("Aunt Hatt"). They are very poor and make a living in a number of ways; Amanda is particularly skilled with machinery, supplying electricity generated from a converted watermill to her neighbours in the village and driving an electric car. The book ends with a scene in which she asks Campion to take her into partnership, and implies that she may be ready to marry him "in about six years". Amanda reappears in The Fashion in Shrouds, now working as an aircraft engineer; she enters into a fake engagement to Campion to help in their investigation. At the end of the book, they genuinely become engaged, but three years later in Traitor's Purse the marriage has not yet taken place, and Amanda falls in love with another man. Campion, who is suffering from amnesia, recognises his real feelings for her for the first time, just as she asks him to break off their engagement. Her new love affair ends badly as the other man rejects her as soon as she becomes available, and at the end of the book, she and Campion decide they will marry straight away. She appears at the end of the next book, Coroner's Pidgin, revealing that they have a son, Rupert, and in a letter at the end of More Work for the Undertaker, fingering the villain. She has important roles in The Tiger in the Smoke, The Beckoning Lady, and The Mind Readers. Her final appearance is in Mr. Campion's Falcon when Amanda telephones Albert in the chapter entitled "Telephone Exchange".
- Rupert is the son of Campion and Amanda. He appears as a small child at the end of Coroner's Pidgin, and plays a significant part in The Beckoning Lady. He is mentioned several times in the later novels, during which time he goes to study at Harvard University. He later appears in Mr Campion's Farthing, written after Allingham's death by her husband Philip Youngman Carter, at which time he is studying to become an actor.
- Val Ferris is Campion's sister. She is never mentioned before her first appearance in The Fashion in Shrouds. Like Campion, she has been disinherited by their family. In her case, this is due to her marriage to an unsuitable man, Sidney Ferris, who turned out to be a drunk and died in a car crash. After that, she developed a successful career as a fashion designer. She marries aircraft manufacturer Alan Dell, after The Fashion in Shrouds.
- Hal Fitton is Amanda's younger brother. The plot of Sweet Danger concerns his claim to the title "Earl of Pontisbright" and to the throne of a fictional Balkan country, Averna, which is small but potentially very wealthy. He comes into his inheritance at the end of the book. He next appears again in The Fashion in Shrouds, by which time he is an undergraduate at Oxford. He has at least one daughter, Sophia, whose son is Edward Longfox, one of the two schoolboys who are at the centre of The Mind Readers.
- Canon Avril is Campion's uncle on his mother's side. He is an elderly, unworldly clergyman. He appears first as one of the main characters in The Tiger in the Smoke and again in The Mind Readers. His character was partly based on Allingham's father, Herbert Allingham.
- The Bishop of Devizes appears in two different parts of the series, apparently referring to two different characters. The first Bishop of Devizes dies before Look to the Lady, and leaves Campion a small inheritance; he is also mentioned in Police at the Funeral. The second appears, alive, in Coroner's Pidgin, as a wine expert.

== Friends and acquaintances ==
- William Faraday ("Uncle William") first appears in Police at the Funeral, when he is in his fifties and living at the house of his domineering, Victorian mother, Caroline Faraday. He appears again in Dancers in Mourning, by which time his mother has died and he has become a bestselling author and librettist. His death occurs before the start of The Beckoning Lady.
- Renee Roper first appears as a theatrical landlady in Dancers in Mourning. Then, in More Work for the Undertaker, she has become the landlady of the eccentric Palinode family; she asks Campion to investigate the mysterious deaths of two members of the family.
- Guffy Randall first appears as part of the foxhunt which comes to Campion's rescue in The Crime at Black Dudley. He appears again in Sweet Danger, where he helps Campion in his investigation. He marries Mary Fitton, Amanda's older sister. Their daughter Mary appears in The Beckoning Lady. Their grandson Sam Ferris is one of the two schoolboys who appear in The Mind Readers.
- Thos. T. Knapp first appears in Mystery Mile as a spiv with a talent for tapping phones, a permanent sniff, an awful old mother and considerable physical courage. He pops up throughout the series, with an offstage role in Coroner's Pidgin, and features in The Mind Readers, employed by a forgotten wartime comms establishment on a bleak estuary island.
- L. C. (Elsie) Corkran appears in both Mr. Campion's Farthing and Mr. Campion's Falcon as an official and then ex-official with connections to "security". His surname is almost certainly a reference to "Stalky" Corkran, the protagonist of Stalky & Co. by Rudyard Kipling, who was modeled on Lionel Dunsterville.

== Bibliography ==
=== Novels ===
- The Crime at Black Dudley (U.S. title: The Black Dudley Murder) (1929)
- Mystery Mile (1930)
- Look to the Lady (The Gyrth Chalice Mystery) (1931)
- Police at the Funeral (1931)
- Sweet Danger (Kingdom of Death or The Fear Sign) (1933)
- Death of a Ghost (1934)
- Flowers for the Judge (Legacy in Blood) (1936)
- The Case of the Late Pig (1937)
- Dancers in Mourning (Who Killed Chloe?) (1937)
- The Fashion in Shrouds (1938)
- Traitor's Purse (The Sabotage Murder Mystery) (1941)
- Coroner's Pidgin (Pearls Before Swine) (1945)
- More Work for the Undertaker (1948)
- The Tiger in the Smoke (1952)
- The Beckoning Lady (The Estate of the Beckoning Lady) (1955)
- Hide My Eyes (Tether's End or Ten Were Missing) (1958)
- The China Governess (1962)
- The Mind Readers (1965)
- Cargo of Eagles (1968) (completed posthumously by Philip Youngman Carter)
- Mr. Campion's Farthing (1969) (by Carter)
- Mr. Campion's Falcon (Mr. Campion's Quarry) (1970) (by Carter)

=== Short story collections ===
- Mr. Campion and Others (1939, 1950)
- The Allingham Case-Book (1969)
- The Allingham Minibus (U.S. title: Mr. Campion's Lucky Day and Other Stories) (1973)
- The Return of Mr. Campion (1989)
