= Campion (1989 TV series) =

British TV drama series (1989–1990)

- Peter Davison as Campion with his Lagonda
- Genre: Mystery drama
- Created by: Margery Allingham
- Developed by: John Hawkesworth
- Written by: Margery Allingham Jeremy Paul
- Starring: Peter Davison; Brian Glover; Andrew Burt
- Composer: Nigel Hess
- Country of origin: United Kingdom
- Original language: English
- No. of series: 2
- No. of episodes: 16

Production
- Producers: Ken Riddington; Jonathan Alwyn
- Cinematography: John Baker; Nigel Walters
- Running time: 50 minutes
- Production companies: Consolidated Productions; WGBH Boston

Original release
- Network: BBC1
- Release: 22 January 1989 – 16 March 1990

Campion is a British television mystery drama first broadcast on the BBC on 22 January 1989. Each of the eight stories featured across the two series, broadcast in 1989 and 1990 respectively, are adapted from the Albert Campion mystery novels written by Margery Allingham. The series stars Peter Davison as Albert Campion, Brian Glover as his manservant Magersfontein Lugg and Andrew Burt as his policeman friend Stanislaus Oates.

Four novels were adapted for each series, each of which was originally broadcast as two separate hour-long episodes. Davison himself sang the title music for the first series; in the second series, it was replaced with an instrumental version. A Lagonda 16/80 featured extensively in the series. The car used in the series is now kept in Germany.

The complete series was released on DVD on 12 May 2008, distributed by Acorn Media UK.

== Cast ==
- Peter Davison as Albert Campion
- Brian Glover as Magersfontein Lugg
- Andrew Burt as Stanislaus Oates

== Episodes ==
=== Series 1 (1989) ===
No.	Title	Directed by	Written by	Original release date
1	"Look to the Lady"	Martyn Friend	Alan Plater	22 January 1989; 29 January 1989
Campion learns that a mediaeval relic called the Gyrth Chalice, which for hundreds of years has been in the care of the Gyrth family at the village of Sanctuary, is threatened by an international gang of art thieves. For the Gyrths the stakes are high – if they lose the Chalice, their country estate will revert to the Crown. Campion travels to Sanctuary with Val Gyrth, and almost at once Val's aunt Lady Diana is found dead in the middle of a wood, apparently frightened to death... it seems the gang is already on the job. Guest stars: Gordon Jackson, Barbara Jefford, John Horsley, Martin Benson, Roy Evans and John Gill
2	"Police at the Funeral"	Ronald Wilson	Jeremy Paul	5 February 1989; 12 February 1989
A murderer is on the loose at Cambridge, where the family of the late Professor John Faraday is being murdered. His niece's husband Andrew is found in the river with a bullet in his head, then his daughter Julia is poisoned and his son William is attacked. Campion is called in by a friend, and Caroline Faraday, the Professor's widow, retains him to protect her eccentric children William and Kitty and to find the murderer. Campion finds himself working on the case with Inspector Stanislaus Oates. Guest stars: Timothy West, Mary Morris, Tim Wylton and John Franklyn-Robbins
3	"The Case of the Late Pig"	Robert Chetwyn	Jill Hyem	19 February 1989; 26 February 1989
Campion investigates the murder of 'Pig' Peters, whose funeral he attended three months earlier. But after being buried, he turns up dead again. Guest stars: Michael Gough, Moray Watson, John Fortune, Dilys Laye, Rob Edwards, Amanda Elwes, Peter Tuddenham and Robert Eddison
4	"Death of a Ghost"	Michael Owen Morris	Elaine Morgan	5 March 1989; 12 March 1989
Campion, getting away from it all, visits his friend Belle Lafcadio, a rich art collector. Trouble begins with the murder of Claire Potter at an exhibition of works by a dead artist. Later, the inquest into her death reveals that she died from nicotine poisoning. Guest stars: Jean Anderson, Adrian Lukis, Carole Ruggier, Rosalie Crutchley and Milton Johns

=== Series 2 (1990) ===
Episode #	Title	Directed by	Written by	Original air date
1	"Sweet Danger"	Robert Tronson	Jill Hyem	12 January 1990; 19 January 1990
Campion is asked to find documents that will prove that the Fittons are the rightful owners of a tiny Dalmatian state where oil has been discovered. Campion returns to Pontisbright in disguise in order to track down Savanake. Guest stars: Iain Cuthbertson, Lysette Anthony, David Haig, Valentine Pelka, Richard Pearson, Frank Mills, Paul Brooke and Arthur Blake
2	"Dancers in Mourning"	Christopher Hodson	Jeremy Paul	9 February 1990; 16 February 1990
Campion visits the country house of the famous dancer Jimmy Sutane to investigate a string of unpleasant practical jokes, and falls in love. On Campion's first night at White Walls, another guest, Chloe Pye dies – though whether by accident, murder or suicide remains to be seen. Influenced by his feelings for Linda Sutane, Campion refuses to believe the evidence against her husband Jimmy, and continues trying to clear his name. But when another murder occurs, Sutane's innocence becomes impossible to sustain. Guest stars: Ian Ogilvy, Pippa Guard, Michael Melia, Tony Steedman, Paddy Joyce, Patricia Brake and Stephen Churchett
3	"Flowers for the Judge"	Michael Owen Morris	Brian Thompson	23 February 1990; 2 March 1990
Campion is drawn into the family feuds besetting the Golden Quill publishing business. One of the Barnabas family, who own the company, is found dead, leaving Campion's friend, Mike Barnabas, as the chief suspect. Campion is determined to prove the innocence of his friend Mike Barnabas, arrested for the murder of Paul Brande, but in trying to do so he puts his own life in jeopardy. Guest stars: Robert Lang, Barrie Ingham, Christopher Benjamin, Patricia Maynard, John Bardon, Roy Spencer and Christian Rodska
4	"Mystery Mile"	Ken Hannam	John Hawkesworth	9 March 1990; 16 March 1990
American Judge Crowdy Lobbett has suffered several attempts on his life and has decided to leave the United States and travel to England in the hope of finding a safe haven. The Lobbett family meet Campion on board their transatlantic liner, and the Judge's son Marlowe asks him to help with their problems. Judge Lobbett mysteriously disappears, Biddy Pagett is kidnapped, and Lugg tries to warn Campion off the Simister mob investigation, but he refuses to give in. Guest stars: Miles Anderson, Geoffrey Bayldon, Edward Kelsey, Roger Hammond, Donald Bisset and John Tordoff
