= Campion (1959 TV series) =

- Genre: Mystery
- Based on: Dancers in Mourning & Death of a Ghost by Margery Allingham
- Written by: John Hopkins
- Directed by: John Harrison
- Starring: Bernard Horsfall; Wally Patch
- Composer: Christopher Whelen
- Country of origin: United Kingdom
- Original language: English
- No. of series: 2
- No. of episodes: 12

Production
- Producer: John Harrison
- Running time: 30 minutes
- Production company: BBC

Original release
- Network: BBC One
- Release: 10 August 1959 – 1 August 1960

Campion is a British mystery television series which first aired on the BBC in two series between 1959 and 1960. It is adaptation of two novels by Margery Allingham, Dancers in Mourning (1937) and Death of a Ghost (1934) featuring the fictional detective Albert Campion. Bernard Horsfall played the title role, with Wally Patch as Magersfontein Lugg.

Other actors appearing in the first series include Denis Quilley, Michael Gough, Noel Howlett, Vanda Godsell, Richard Pearson, Olive Sloane, Sheila Burrell and John Ruddock as Inspector Stanislaus Oates. The second series featured Mary Merrall, Andre Van Gyseghem, Shay Gorman and Arthur Brough as Inspector Oates

== Bibliography ==
- Ellen Baskin. Serials on British Television, 1950-1994. Scolar Press, 1996.
