= Look to the Lady =

1931 novel by Margery Allingham

- First edition (UK)
- Author: Margery Allingham
- Language: English
- Series: Albert Campion
- Genre: Crime novel
- Publisher: Jarrolds Publishing; Doubleday, Doran
- Publication date: 1931
- Publication place: United Kingdom
- Media type: Print (hardback & paperback)
- Preceded by: Mystery Mile
- Followed by: Police at the Funeral

Look to the Lady is a crime novel by Margery Allingham, first published in January 1931, in the United Kingdom by Jarrolds Publishing, London, and in the United States by Doubleday, Doran, New York, as The Gyrth Chalice Mystery. It is the third novel featuring the mysterious Albert Campion, accompanied by his butler/valet/bodyguard Magersfontein Lugg.

== Plot introduction ==
Albert Campion rescues Val Gyrth from the streets of London, to help him save a family heirloom, the Gyrth Chalice, from a band of devious criminals. In Suffolk, he reunites the son with his family, but soon one of them is found dead, and preventing the theft of the chalice must be combined with solving the mysterious death.

== Plot summary ==
Val Gyrth, heir to the Gyrth family and their traditional vocation of guarding the famous Gyrth Chalice, is homeless and wandering the streets. After a mysterious chain of events, he is plucked out of danger by Albert Campion, who explains that a conspiracy of art collectors and criminals hopes to steal the treasure his family is charged with protecting.

Returning Gyrth to his family in the village of Sanctuary in Suffolk, Campion is shocked when Val's aunt Di, a bohemian who upset the family by being photographed with the chalice, is found lying dead in a spooky forest clearing, apparently frightened to death.

With Val's 25th birthday, at which a great secret will be revealed to him, fast approaching, Campion and the Gyrths smuggle the chalice to London, evading ruthless crooks. There, they find it is a fake, a replacement made a few hundred years ago, while the genuine, thousand-year-old chalice remains out of sight. A crook informs them that someone named "Daisy" is behind the chalice thieves; Val is left in the safety of Campion's flat, protecting the decoy chalice.

Back in Sanctuary, Lugg has been frightened by a monster in the woods, perhaps the same thing that scared Aunt Di to death. Accompanied by the Gyrths' neighbour Professor Cairey, a historian friend of Campion's, and a local woodsman, they trap the monster, revealed to be an aged witch of the village, protecting her slow-witted poacher son, descendants of a family of witches with the name Munsey. They further learn that she was encouraged to frighten Aunt Di by someone named Daisy, and the local woodsman tells Campion that a local stable owner, Mrs Shannon, whom Campion has met a few times already, is called Daisy.

Awaking after his long night in the woods, Campion learns that his flat has been attacked, the chalice taken and Val Gyrth vanished in pursuit. He rushes off, leaving instructions that a pouch be delivered to Gypsies staying nearby. Later, the chalice arrives by post, and Penny and Beth find Val in a field, bedraggled and exhausted but alive, with a White Campion in his buttonhole.

Campion strolls up to Mrs Shannon's stables, where he finds her playing cards with a band of well-known crooks, including a cat-burglar. Campion is locked in a room above the stables for a day, and visited by Mrs Shannon on the night of Val's birthday. Realising he knows too much, she pushes him through the floor into a stable with a wild, angry horse; he hides in a hay-feeder until rescued by Professor Cairey, who heard Daisy's name from the Munseys too. A gang of Gypsies, summoned by Campion's message, arrive and scatter Shannon's gang, but she escapes in a car. Campion follows on the wild horse, temporarily tamed by a gypsy.

Arriving at the Gyrth's Tower, he finds Mrs Shannon lowering herself from the roof to see into the window of a secret room, only lit up on the heir's birthday and rumoured to contain a fearsome secret that protects the chalice. Looking in, she goes white with fear, and falls from her rope to her death.

Campion reveals that he had found Val, knocked out by the crooks he pursued in London, and sent him home before heading to the stables. Next day a representative of royalty arrives to inspect the chalice, and Campion and the Professor are permitted to join the party; taken to the secret room, they see the chalice guarded by the skeleton of a giant, clad in armour, and the chalice, a beautiful bowl of red gold and rubies.

== Characters in Look to the Lady ==
- Albert Campion, a mysterious adventurer of noble blood
- Magersfontein Lugg, Campion's servant, an ex-criminal
- Percival St. John Wykes Gyrth, known as Val, a young man of ancient family
- Colonel Sir Percival Christian St John Gyrth, Val's father, bearer of the Gyrth secret
- Penelope "Penny" Gyrth, Val's sister
- Diana Gyrth, Lady Pethwick, Val's aunt, "Maid of the Cup" and friend to bohemians
- Branch, their capable butler, an old cohort of Lugg
- Professor Cairey, their neighbour, an expert in archaeology and folklore
- Beth Cairey, the professor's charming daughter
- Mrs Dick Shannon, a loud-voiced, tactless local stable-owner
- Percy Peck, a knowledgeable local woodsman
- Mrs Munsey, hairless old crone of the village
- Sammy Munsey, her son, the village idiot
- Israel Melchizadek, a jeweller
- Stanislaus Oates, Scotland Yard Inspector, a friend of Campion

== Adaptations ==
The story was adapted, following the original closely, for television by the BBC, the first of eight Campion stories starring Peter Davison as Campion, Brian Glover as Lugg and Gordon Jackson as Professor Cairey. Originally broadcast as two separate hour-long episodes, the original UK air date was 22 January 1989. The series was shown in the United States by PBS. It was filmed partly on location in the village of Kersey, Suffolk.

The novel had been adapted by the BBC once before. As a radio play for the Home Service in 1957. had been played by Richard Hurndall, who like Peter Davison also appeared as an incarnation of the Doctor in The Five Doctors.
