= Traitor's Purse =

1941 novel by Margery Allingham

- First edition (UK)
- Author: Margery Allingham
- Language: English
- Series: Albert Campion
- Genre: Crime novel
- Publisher: Heinemann (UK)
- Publication date: 1941
- Publication place: United Kingdom
- Media type: Print (hardback & paperback)
- ISBN: 978-0-09-949283-2 (Vintage, Random House)
- Preceded by: The Fashion in Shrouds
- Followed by: Coroner's Pidgin

Traitor's Purse is a crime novel written by Margery Allingham. It was originally published in 1941 in the United Kingdom by Heinemann, London and in the United States by Doubleday, New York as The Sabotage Murder Mystery. It is the eleventh novel in the Albert Campion series and is set during the Second World War.

== Plot introduction ==
Albert Campion wakes in hospital suffering from amnesia. He knows there is something vital he must do, but he cannot remember what it is – or even his own name. He finds himself on the run, suspected of attacking a policeman, as he tries to avert a catastrophe.

The action takes place during the early years of the Second World War in the fictional town of Bridge in South West England, which is run by an ancient hereditary organisation, the Masters of Bridge.

Traitor's Purse (1941), 2006 Vintage paperback edition

== Plot summary ==
In the early days of World War II, a man wakes in a country hospital to find he cannot remember anything prior to his arrival except that he has something vital to do, somehow connected to the number fifteen. He hears voices outside discussing an unconscious patient – who they say has killed a policeman and will be hanged. Assuming that he is the patient being discussed, the man escapes in a stolen car but soon realises he is being followed. Instead of the police, however, the car is driven by a woman who appears to assisting the amnesiac man in his mission; she refers to him as "Albert Campion". The car also contains an old man, Mr Anscombe. After seeing Anscombe home, the two continue to the house of Lee Aubrey, the head of a local scientific research body called the institute, with whom they are staying. Campion begins to remember the woman, who is called Amanda, and due to their familiarity begins to assume that they are married, only to be shocked when Amanda informs him she wants to break off their engagement. As such, he does not tell her about his amnesia.

Campion receives a letter from Stanislaus Oates, an acquaintance from Scotland Yard, telling him to investigate Anscombe – moments before Superintendent Hutch of the local police arrives to inform the party that Anscombe is dead. Campion, the last person to see Anscombe alive, accompanies Hutch to the scene of the death, and the two are joined by Pyne, a fellow guest of Aubrey's. Pyne's familiar, friendly manner convinces Campion that the two are friends, prompting him to confide in Pyne. Campion is thus horrified when, after Pyne leaves, Hutch informs him that they had only met three days before.

Amanda tells Campion that she is falling in love with Lee Aubrey, causing him further anguish. Later that night, Hutch arrives at Aubrey's home in secret to meet with Campion; the two had previously arranged a covert mission into the nearby town of Bridge. Hutch smuggles Campion into the Council Chamber, a meeting place for a local organisation of dignitaries known as the Masters of Bridge, which is built into caves in a hill overlooking the town. Bluffing his way through an investigation of the site, Campion finds an agenda for a meeting which mentions Minute Fifteen, and Anscombe's sudden retirement from the order. Exploring further, he finds a vast cavern filled with hundreds of trucks.

The next day, Aubrey takes Campion for a tour of the institute, a scientific where they meet Mrs Ericson, whose volunteer workers are housed in the Institute grounds – she is clearly infatuated with Aubrey. They also meet a researcher who is developing a new, very powerful explosive. Hutch approaches Campion, asking him questions to prove his identity; Campion realises that Pyne has hinted that Campion might be an imposter, and ironically due to his amnesia he cannot prove his true identity. Panicking, he knocks Hutch out and flees to the nearby town of Coachingford. There, on instinct, he enters a local newsagent's shop where in a backroom he encounters a man who recognises him—his manservant, Lugg. Campion confides to Lugg about his condition, and Lugg shows him a basket filled with a large sum of bank notes that Campion left on his previous visit.

Soon after, a sinister man with a gun arrives at the newsagents and attempts to bribe Campion to leave town. Upon realising that Campion is not the imposter he suspects him to be, the man panics and flees. Amanda summons Campion to a nearby hotel where he meets the sister of Mr Anscombe. Miss Anscombe gives Campion her brother's diary, and tells him she believes he was smuggling contraband in the caves under the hill. The hotel is surrounded by both police and criminals, so Campion escapes over the roofs and catches a train to London where he meets Sir Henry Bull, a high-ranking member of HM Treasury and one of the Masters of Bridge. He tells Campion that Minute Fifteen is a war loan, details of which are going to be mailed to every taxpayer in the country. Realising Pyne's involvement with the affair, Campion rushes back to Coachingford but is arrested at the train station. Panicking and desperate, Campion attempts to escape the police station but is violently subdued by the skeptical officers and knocked unconscious.

Upon awakening, Campion's memories of the events preceding his arrival at the hospital are restored. He remembers that he and Oates were investigating a counterfeiting operation undercover, but had been ambushed by their enemies and assaulted, causing Campion's amnesia. The prisoner that was being discussed when Campion awoke was in fact the unconscious and disguised Oates. When Amanda arrives to post bail, Campion finally realises what the scheme he must foil is; an attempt to flood the United Kingdom with large sums of counterfeit money, which would devalue the pound sterling, cause inflation to skyrocket and destabilise the economy and the government. The money is to be posted at the same time as news about the Minute Fifteen war loan, disguised as a social security payment to the poor. Campion manages to get himself released barely in time to make it back to the caves under the Council Chamber, where he discovers that the money is about to be transported. Using the experimental explosive he was shown at the institute, Campion manages to destroy the counterfeit money, killing Pyne and several of his men in the process.

Afterwards, Campion and Hutch realise Pyne could not have carried out the plan by himself. The mastermind is revealed to be Lee Aubrey. Aubrey confidently admits what he has done—having decided that the government was too inefficiently run to survive, he intended to use the scheme to bring down the government and install himself as a technocratic dictator in its place. Afterwards, Amanda and Campion talk, and Amanda admits that Aubrey had lost interest in her once he had convinced her that she was in love with him. Realising he has taken Amanda for granted, Campion proposes that they marry the next day, and she agrees.

== Characters in "Traitor's Purse" ==
- Albert Campion
- Lady Amanda Fitton
- Magersfontein Lugg, Campion's servant
- Stanislaus Oates of Scotland Yard
- Superintendent Hutch, a senior officer in the local county police force
- Robert Anscombe, Secretary to the Masters of Bridge
- Miss Anscombe, his elderly sister
- Lee Aubrey, a brilliant academic, Principal of the Bridge Institute (a research institute owned by the Masters of Bridge)
- Mrs Ericson, in charge of a group of women doing voluntary work
- Mr Pyne, owner of a business evacuated to Bridge
- Sir Henry Bull, a Treasury minister and Senior Master of Bridge

== Allusions/references to actual history, geography and current science ==
Operation Bernhard was a real life German plot to flood wartime Britain with counterfeit currency – however this did not become public until after the end of the war, so Allingham was unaware of it at the time the novel was written.
