= The Case of the Late Pig =

1937 novel by Margery Allingham

- First edition
- Author: Margery Allingham
- Language: English
- Series: Albert Campion
- Genre: Crime fiction
- Publisher: Hodder & Stoughton
- Publication date: 1937
- Publication place: United Kingdom
- Media type: Print (Hardback & Paperback)
- Preceded by: Dancers in Mourning
- Followed by: The Fashion in Shrouds

The Case of the Late Pig is a crime novel by English writer Margery Allingham, first published 1937, by Hodder & Stoughton. It is the ninth novel featuring the mysterious Albert Campion and his butler/valet/bodyguard Magersfontein Lugg.

== Plot summary ==
As Lugg reads aloud the obituaries one morning, he comes across one for an old school nemesis of Campion. Surprisingly, an anonymous letter inviting Campion to the funeral has also arrived in the morning post. R.I. "Pig" Peters is reported dead according to the doctor who treated him.

Five months later, Campion receives a panicked call from a friend, something about a murder. Campion drives down to the friend's home where her father reveals the most assuredly dead body of R.I. “Pig” Peters, his head caved in no more than 12 hours earlier.

Individuals from Peters' first funeral and acquaintances of Pig attend. The village population has increased.

Now begins Campion's search, which leads to a missing body, a grisly scarecrow and one too many beers for Lugg before he discovers the madman that planned more than a few murders.

This is the only Albert Campion story told in the first person by Campion.

== Television ==
In two series of BBC adaptations of Allingham's stories entitled Campion (shown in the United States by PBS), Campion was played by Peter Davison, Lugg by Brian Glover and Oates by Andrew Burt. In the first series, Peter Davison sang the title music himself.

Campion adapted a total of eight novels, each of which was originally broadcast as two separate hour-long episodes.

=== Series 1 (1989) ===
The Case of the Late Pig, Season 1, Episode 3,

- Original Air Date: 19 February 1989
