= Mystery Mile =

1930 novel by Margery Allingham

- First US edition
- Author: Margery Allingham
- Language: English
- Series: Albert Campion
- Genre: Crime novel
- Publisher: Jarrolds Publishing; Doubleday, Doran
- Publication date: 1930
- Publication place: United Kingdom
- Media type: Print (hardback & paperback)
- OCLC: 56648169
- Preceded by: The Crime at Black Dudley
- Followed by: Look to the Lady

Mystery Mile is a crime novel by Margery Allingham, first published in 1930, in the United Kingdom by Jarrolds Publishing, London, and in the United States by Doubleday, Doran, New York. Following his first, supporting appearance in The Crime at Black Dudley (1929), it is the first of many novels starring the mysterious Albert Campion, and introduces his butler/valet/bodyguard Magersfontein Lugg.

== Plot introduction ==
Crossing the Atlantic on the luxurious liner Elephantine are an American judge, Crowdy Lobbett, and his children. A number of people around Judge Lobbett have been murdered, and he is said to be fleeing to England for safety. Apparent buffoon Albert Campion offers the family sanctuary with his friends in remote Suffolk, but a local commits suicide, the Judge vanishes, and another disappearance follows soon after. What is the Judge's mysterious secret? How was he kidnapped from a remote maze? Can Campion and his friends get to the bottom of things before it's too late?

== Plot summary ==
When Campion saves him from certain death on the ship over, Judge Lobbett looks into the man's background, and is advised to trust him. So, he takes Campion's advice and brings his handsome son and pretty daughter down to Mystery Mile, a tiny village on a near-island on the Suffolk coast, where Campion's friends Biddy and Giles Paget own a run-down manor house.

The night they arrive, a roving fortune-teller visits, and soon afterward the local Rector "St." Swithin Cush, a mild and much-loved man, commits gruesome suicide, leaving a note and some mysterious clues—a red knight from his chess set, and the word "Danger" in encrypted form.

Settling in at the manor, the judge calls in an art expert to inspect a possible masterpiece, but as the man (an annoying bore they had encountered on the boat) arrives at the house, the judge vanishes, seemingly inexplicably, while exploring the maze. They search for the judge's secret knowledge, the clue to the identity of crime boss Simister, which has brought such danger, but find only a large box of children's books.

Travelling to London to investigate the judge's enemies, and to shake off art expert Barber, Campion and Lobbett's son Marlowe are recalled by a shocking telegram, but find the local Post Office man has exaggerated things—not a body, but Judge Lobbett's clothes, have been found. Next day, Biddy disappears, and Campion soon sees that the shopkeeper is behind it.

Thos. T Knapp, a low-class criminal of Campion's acquaintance, arrives with news of their enemies, and they all decamp to London to rescue Biddy, leaving Lobbett's daughter, Isobel, safe in Campion's flat. They break into the house of the fortune-teller, where Biddy is being cruelly interrogated, and after a fight and Campion's use of a smoke-bomb, escape, leaving the gang in disarray.

Back at Campion's flat, they see a photo of the judge in a newspaper, and Campion reveals that he had arranged for the disappearance, and hidden the man on a nearby estate, following St. Swithin's advice. They go there, fetch the judge, and he, Giles and Campion decamp for Mystery Mile once more, where they find the household, including Mr Barber, drugged. They retrieve the judge's evidence—a book of stories from the Thousand and One Nights from his set—and Giles and the judge flee using the same path used to smuggle the judge away before, a boat from a beach near some dangerous "soft" – mud that works like quicksand.

Campion sits in the hut and deciphers the clue—the art expert's name is Ali Barber. The man comes in, and reveals his secret role as Simister, head of a colossal criminal gang, inherited from his father. He tries to kill Campion with a syringe filled with acid, but Campion breaks through the floor of the hut and falls beneath it. Barber goes to retrieve the book, but is taken by the soft mud, dying horribly.

Later, when Campion is recuperating, his friend Stanislaus Oates tells him the secret of Swithin Cush's suicide – he was in fact not a parson at all, having taken the place of his brother who died young. The fortune-teller, a blackmailer working for Simister, knew this and threatened to reveal it.

Biddy and Giles Paget plan to marry Marlowe and Isobel Lobbett, respectively, and to sell the valuable painting for a small fortune.

== Characters in "Mystery Mile" ==
- Magersfontein Lugg, Campion's servant, a beefy ex-crook
- Giles Paget, owner of the manor on Mystery Mile, a friend of Campion
- Biddy Paget, Giles' sister, whom Campion admires
- Addlepate, originally owned by Campion but now the Paget's dog
- Crowdy Lobbett, an American judge, scourge of gangsters
- Marlowe Lobbett, his handsome son
- Isobel Lobbett, his attractive daughter
- Swithin Cush, rector of Mystery Mile, a friend of the Pagets
- Ali Ferguson Barber, art collector and bore
- Thos. T Knapp, low-class London criminal, known to (but despised by) Campion

== Literary significance and criticism ==
The setting, a semi-island called Mystery Mile, is based on Mersea Island, Essex, where Allingham spent some time in her youth, and set her first novel, Blackkerchief Dick.

The book includes some hints about Campion's background. His real first name is "Rudolph", and his last name begins with "K". Campion looks enough like some Very Important Person to impersonate him on a trip to Asia. These hints appear off and on throughout many other Campion novels.

Campion's affection for Biddy, and jealousy of Marlowe Lobbett, is quite apparent throughout, though never explicitly stated. Campion's thoughts turn to Biddy again in Look to the Lady.

The character of Simister bears a striking similarity to Keyser Söze, a fictional character in the 1995 film The Usual Suspects — an all powerful crime lord, operating entirely through minions so that he himself is never exposed, thought by many to be a myth, to have existed too long to be a single man, and originating from the Middle East.

== Television adaptations ==
The story was adapted for television by the BBC, the last of eight Campion stories starring Peter Davison as Campion and Brian Glover as Lugg. Originally broadcast as two separate hour-long episodes, the original UK air date was 9 March 1990. The series was shown in the United States by PBS.
