= Dancers in Mourning =

1937 novel by Margery Allingham

- First edition
- Author: Margery Allingham
- Language: English
- Series: Albert Campion
- Genre: Crime fiction, Theatre-fiction
- Publisher: Heinemann
- Publication date: 1937
- Publication place: United Kingdom
- Media type: Print (Hardback & Paperback)
- Preceded by: Flowers for the Judge
- Followed by: The Case of the Late Pig

Dancers in Mourning is a crime novel by English writer Margery Allingham, first published in 1937, in the United Kingdom by Heinemann, London and in the United States by Doubleday Doran, New York City; later U.S. versions used the title Who Killed Chloe?.

It is the eighth novel to feature the mysterious Albert Campion, aided as usual by his butler/valet/bodyguard Magersfontein Lugg.

== Plot summary ==
An old friend of Albert Campion, "Uncle" William Faraday, has written a successful book that has been turned into a hit musical comedy. Jimmy Sutane, an established actor and dancer, is the star of the musical. But recently someone has it in for Sutane and has started playing harmless practical jokes that have caused the highly emotional Jimmy much trauma. Jimmy asks Campion to look into who the prankster may be. So Campion takes a trip to the Sutane household, where he unexpectedly finds more than he bargained for, which is a strange mix of the theatrical and the snobbish

Chloe Pye is an overdone and melodramatic has-been actress that no one seems to like. When she is accidentally run over by Jimmy Sutane in his car, no one seems upset and everyone is eager to call it an accident. But Campion is not so certain, and the more he investigates the less he desires to find out about the world of the Sutanes.

Campion must deal with high strung entertainers and his own emotions as he tries to find out if a murder even happened, and who is still playing tricks on the star and his family.

It turns out that Squire Mercer, a genius musician who lives with the Sutanes, was once married to Chloe Pye. She wanted to leave him for Jimmy Sutane, and he threatened never to divorce her. She told him that divorce wasn't necessary since she was still married to someone else, thereby committing bigamy with Squire Mercer. Her return to the Sutane household was to get back into the good graces of Squire Mercer so that he would fall back in love with her and support her financially. Instead he gets annoyed and angry at her advances and kills her. Then he throws her body off a bridge in front of Jimmy Sutane's car so that the whole thing will look like an accident. Unfortunately Sutane's understudy, who has been playing the pranks on Sutane because he wants to play the lead role in the hit show, witnessed the whole of Chloe's "accident". When he and several innocent bystanders are killed by one of Mercer's old-time criminal associates, everything is gradually uncovered by the police. Unfortunately, Campion's love for Sutane's wife clouds his judgement so that he thinks Jimmy has actually murdered both Chloe and his understudy. It is only at the end that he discovers the truth for himself.

== Film, TV or theatrical adaptations ==
The story has twice been adapted for television for the BBC; in 1959 for Campion, and again in 1990, starring Peter Davison as Campion and Brian Glover as Lugg.
