= B. A. Pike =

Barry Pike is the chairman of the Margery Allingham Society and an authority on Margery Allingham and other Golden Age detective writers such as Gladys Mitchell and Dorothy L Sayers.

== Talks ==
- BBC - Radio 4 - Woman's Hour - Margery Allingham, 14 June 2004 — A retrospective 100 years after the crime writers birth
- Bodies from the Library, 11 June 2016, British Library
- Bodies from the Library - "Margery Allingham", 20 June 2015, British Library

== Publications ==
=== Books ===
- Campion's Career: A Study of the Novels of Margery Allingham; 1987, ISBN 0879723807.
- Murder Takes a Holiday, 1989, ISBN 074723356X.
- Detective Fiction: The Collector's Guide, with John Cooper; 1988, ISBN 0950905755.
- Murder in Miniature: and Other Stories; Leo Bruce short story compilation; 1992, ISBN 0897333675.
- Detective Fiction: The Collector's Guide, 2nd edition, with John Cooper; 1994.
- Artists in Crime: Illustrated Survey of Crime Fiction First Edition Dust Wrappers, 1920–70; 1995, ISBN 1859281885.

=== Journals (as editor) ===
- Bottle Street Gazette,

=== Journals (as contributor) ===
- Bottle Street Gazette,

=== Articles ===
- "In Praise of Gladys Mitchell" in the Armchair Detective, Vol. 9 No. 4 October 1976,
- "Wimsey on the Wireless", in "Sidelight’s on Sayers" Vol. XLIX October 1999.

=== Crosswords ===
- Under the pseudonym BAP, B A Pike set seven Listener cryptic crosswords, 1963–1969.
