= Flowers for the Judge =

1936 novel by Margery Allingham

- First edition cover
- Author: Margery Allingham
- Language: English
- Series: Albert Campion
- Genre: Crime novel
- Publisher: Heinemann (UK); Doubleday, Doran (US)
- Publication date: 1936
- Publication place: United Kingdom
- Media type: Print (hardback & paperback)
- Preceded by: Death of a Ghost
- Followed by: The Case of the Late Pig

Flowers for the Judge is a crime novel by Margery Allingham, first published in February 1936, in the United Kingdom by Heinemann, London, and in the United States by Doubleday, Doran, New York. It is the seventh novel to feature the mysterious Albert Campion, aided by his grouchy manservant Magersfontein Lugg.

== Plot introduction ==
The story starts in 1911 with the mysterious disappearance of one of the members of the Barnabas family, owners of a leading publishing house in London. After the initial investigation, the mystery soon disappears from the public's mind, and the remaining cousins continue the family business. Twenty years later, another member of the same family has also gone missing, and Albert Campion, a friend of the family, is brought in to find the wayward cousin.

This time, the missing cousin shows up dead. The obvious suspect is the youngest of the Barnabas cousins, who also happens to love the dead man's wife. Campion must delve deep into the Barnabas family history to find the real murderer, but finds much more than he expected.

== Plot summary ==
The Barnabas family is no stranger to mystery, one of the founder's nephews, Tom Barnabas, having disappeared from the street in broad daylight never to be seen again. When it is remarked, at a Sunday evening gathering held by Gina Brande in her flat next door to the offices, that Paul Brande, her inattentive husband, has not been home for three days, no-one finds it too remarkable. Shortly after the arrival of his old friend Albert Campion to look into the vanishing, Paul's younger cousin Mike, in love with Gina, goes to the vault to fetch some papers for the eldest cousin, the Barnabas Managing Director John Widdowson, and returns looking shaken, but saying nothing.

Next morning, Paul's body is found sprawled in plain view in front of the vault. The doctor who is called immediately recognizes that Paul has been dead for several days, and a decision is made to move the body from where it was found, destroying clues. Mike is sent to inform Mrs Brande and seen comforting her tenderly. Campion investigates the scene of the crime and finds a recently broken ventilator to the rear of the vault, which leads to a next-door garage. Questioning staff, he discovers that the position of the body made it impossible for Mike to have missed him the night before. The police find a length of rubber pipe stained with soot.

At the inquest, the doctors and police reveal that Paul was killed by carbon monoxide inhalation, the pipe having been used to connect the exhaust of Mike's car to the vault ventilator. A neighbour testifies she heard the car running in the garage from six to nine on the night Paul disappeared. Mike says he was out walking the streets until eight, and that around nine had started the car to warm it up by running the engine for a few minutes before going for a drive. Gina's housekeeper speculates too freely about her mistress's relationship with Mike, and at the end of the inquest Mike is arrested for the murder.

Campion befriends Ritchie, an odd and rather awkward cousin - the brother of the vanished Tom, and with his help questions Miss Netley, Paul's suspicious secretary. He tracks down Paul's mistress, but finds she knows nothing, except that he missed an appointment with her on the night he died. He learns of a valuable unpublished manuscript of a play by William Congreve owned by the firm and regarded as a financial asset, which Paul had hoped to display, and of a visit Paul paid to a London district on business concerning a key. From his manservant Lugg, he learns that a renowned underground key copier lives in the area mentioned, and together they investigate, Lugg's criminal past helping to persuade the man to help by providing a copy of the key he made for Paul.

Campion visits the Barnabas offices with Ritchie's help and finds someone in the vault. They fight, and Campion subdues the man, who turns out to be the accountant, Rigget. Rigget confesses to having made a copy of the vault key and sneaking in at night to look for any valuable information. On the night after Paul's death, he had also entered the room and found Paul curled up and dead in a corner, and the vault unlocked; he locked it using Paul's key. He also took the vault key from inside the door, locked it on the outside when he left, returning the key to its normal place.

The trial begins the next day, and Campion, exhausted from his long night, attends. Things look bleak for Mike, but Campion has found out from an uncle working at the British Museum that the document in the vault is not the original manuscript. He visits John Widdowson's flat with Ritchie, looks around, questions the maid, and leaves a note for Widdowson enclosing a page from the facsimile manuscript. Widdowson calls him later, agrees that the manuscript he found was a facsimile, but that the original is safe in one of the firm's other offices, telling him to confirm the fact by opening a certain locked cupboard. Campion goes there, still weary from a lack of sleep, and almost hurls himself at the jammed door to force it open. Becoming suspicious, he kicks it instead, and discovers it leads outside to a terrible drop. He realizes that he too was to be killed by Widdowson for the same reason he killed Brande, to prevent exposure that the play, which is the company's financial asset, is not an original.

During the court proceedings against Mike on the next day, the case is suddenly called off. Widdowson has been found in his bath, an apparent suicide caused by carbon monoxide fumes from a gas water-heater. Campion learns that the windows had been were wedged shut from the outside, that the heater had been manipulated, and that Ritchie has vanished. Later, holidaying in France with Mike, Campion finds the long lost Tom Barnabas, alias Pierre Robert, who tells him that instead of his legacy he had taken the original manuscript to buy a circus, in which Campion sees Ritchie performing, now finally in his element as a clown. Campion realizes that Ritchie's quietly avenging the murder of Paul by killing Widdowson gave him the role of "the king's executioner."

== Characters in Flowers for the Judge ==
- John Widdowson, head of the Barnabas publishing company, and nephew of the founder
- Paul Brande, another Barnabas nephew, also employed by the company
- Gina Brande, Paul's attractive but neglected American wife
- Mrs Austin, their maid, a kindly but tactless woman
- Mike Wedgwood, the youngest of the nephews, a junior partner in the firm
- Albert Campion, an old friend of Mike, an adventurer, detective and universal uncle
- Magersfontein Lugg, Campion's manservant, a temperamental ex-burglar
- Ritchie Barnabas, an apparently simple nephew employed in minor duties, a long-armed man
- Tom Barnabas, the long-missing brother of Ritchie, thought to have vanished into thin air
- Miss Florence Curley, an efficient lady, long employed by the Barnabases
- Peter Rigget, an accountant with the firm, a stocky and sneaky man
- Mr Scruby, the family's lawyer
- Alexander Barnabas, a famously dramatic barrister, son of the founder of the company

== Film, TV or theatrical adaptations ==
The story was adapted for television by the BBC, the seventh of eight Campion stories starring Peter Davison as Campion and Brian Glover as Lugg. Originally broadcast as two separate hour-long episodes, the original UK air date was 23 February 1990. The series was shown in the United States by PBS.
