= Coroner's Pidgin =

1945 novel by Margery Allingham

- First edition
- Author: Margery Allingham
- Language: English
- Series: Albert Campion
- Genre: Crime novel
- Publisher: William Heinemann
- Publication date: 1945
- Publication place: United Kingdom
- Media type: Print (Hardback & Paperback)
- Pages: 236
- ISBN: 978-0-09-949278-8 (2006 Vintage)
- OCLC: 70059533
- Preceded by: Traitor's Purse
- Followed by: More Work for the Undertaker

Coroner's Pidgin is a crime novel by Margery Allingham, first published in 1945, in the United Kingdom by William Heinemann, London and in the United States by Doubleday Doran, New York as Pearls Before Swine. It is the twelfth novel in the Albert Campion series.

== Plot introduction ==
Just returned from years overseas on a secret mission, Albert Campion is relaxing in his bath when his servant Magersfontein Lugg and a lady of unmistakably aristocratic bearing appear in his flat carrying the corpse of a woman. At first Campion is unwilling to get involved, but he is forced to bring his powers of detection to bear on the case, and to solve not only the mystery of the murdered woman but also the alarming disappearance of some well-known art treasures. Campion discovers the clue to the mystery by tracing two bottles of a very rare wine.
