= Death of a Ghost =

1934 novel by Margery Allingham

- First edition (US)
- Author: Margery Allingham
- Cover artist: Boris Artzybasheff (US)
- Language: English
- Series: Albert Campion
- Genre: Crime novel
- Publisher: Heinemann (UK); Doubleday Doran (US)
- Publication date: 1934
- Publication place: United Kingdom
- Media type: Print (hardcover)
- Preceded by: Sweet Danger
- Followed by: Flowers for the Judge

Death of a Ghost is a crime novel by Margery Allingham, first published in February 1934, in the United Kingdom by Heinemann, London and in the United States by Doubleday, Doran, New York. It is the sixth novel with the mysterious Albert Campion, aided by his policeman friend Stanislaus Oates.

== Plot introduction ==
At the former home of John Lafcadio, the great painter dead some 18 years, the annual ceremony to unveil a painting he left behind to keep his memory alive is interrupted by a murder. Suspicion falls on a family member, but with no proof the police are baffled. When murder once again visits "Little Venice", Albert Campion must exercise all his powers to bring the killer to justice...

== Plot summary ==
John Lafcadio, who modestly described himself as "probably the greatest painter since Rembrandt", has left a bizarre legacy – a collection of twelve sealed paintings, to be unveiled one at a time at an annual event commencing ten years after his death. While the first seven ceremonies went smoothly, the eighth starts with family ructions, when John's granddaughter Linda finds her boyfriend Tommy has returned from a painting trip to Rome with a model, whom he has married to get into the country. Albert Campion, a friend of Belle and the family, persuades her to attend the show, just in time to be there when Tommy is stabbed to death during a power cut.

Campion calls in his old friend Stanislaus Oates to help avoid scandal, but Oates is convinced Linda must be guilty, as she has the only obvious motive. Max Fustian, a hanger-on to Lafcadio's coat-tails and now a flourishing art dealer, confesses to the crime, but his confession is laughable and a clear attempt to clear Linda. No further proof can be found however, and thanks to pressure from some important dignitaries attending the show, the matter is hushed up.

The mystery continues, however, as Tommy's art and possessions slowly vanish, until no trace of him remains. Campion meets up with Max Fustian, and finds himself entertaining strange suspicions of the odd little man. Some weeks later, Belle visits Claire Potter in her studio in the garden and finds her dead, face down on the couch. Nicotine poisoning is diagnosed, and suspicion falls at first on her husband, who had skipped work that day and had returned home for a minute an hour before the body was discovered, only to leave again in a hurry.

Potter reveals his wife suffered from alcoholism, and frequently drank herself unconscious; he had assumed she had done this once more, washed her glass and left her there. Seeking the source of the poisoned booze, Campion and Oates discover that Claire took in wood-blocks for cleaning from Max Fustian, and had returned a parcel that very day. Questioning the delivery boy, they find that he once dropped a similar package, and was surprised to find the wrapping wet.

Convinced of Fustian's guilt but lacking proof, Campion seeks a motive. He learns from the model Rosa-Rosa that Tommy had a cottage in the country, and from the cook Lisa that Lafcadio, despite his determination to defeat his rival and keep his fame alive, had only managed to complete eight of the twelve paintings of his legacy, filling the remaining packages with junk as a joke. Campion visits Tommy's cottage and finds Max there, all traces of Tommy burnt. He returns to Little Venice later, and finds Max in a blazing row with Belle – he has insisted he must take the remaining Lafcadio works abroad and sell them, and she has refused to let him.

Sure now that Max had Tommy fake the last four paintings for him, Campion gets further proof in the form of a drawing uncovered in Paris by Linda. He meets Max and they go out to dinner, where Max has him sample a strange and rare wine from Romania. Too late, Campion recalls the wine has a terribly intoxicating effect if taken after spirits – and Max had made sure Campion drank much gin before dinner. After a drunken tour of town, Max leads Campion to the edge of a Tube platform, and pushes hard – only to be stopped by the plain-clothes men Oates has had on their tail, after a meeting with Campion that morning.

Visiting Fustian in prison, Campion finds him a gibbering lunatic, his mind pushed over the edge by the defeat of his schemes.

== Characters in "Death of a Ghost" ==
- John Sebastian Lafcadio, a famous artist, eighteen years dead and still a dominant personality in his home
- Belle Lafcadio, widow of the artist, a much-loved and charming old lady
- Linda Lafcadio, granddaughter of John and Belle
- Thomas Dacre, Linda's fiancé, recently returned from a two-year spell in Italy
- Rosa-Rosa Rosini, a striking-looking model, brought back from Italy by Tommy
- Matt D'Urfey, Tommy's roommate and a friend of Linda, a solid and friendly chap
- Donna Beatrice, real name Harriet Pickering, once Lafcadio's model, become a rather dotty old lady obsessed with the spirit world
- W. Tennyson Potter, a failed and miserable artist taken in by Lafcadio
- Claire Potter, his wife, also an artist and a former Lafcadio model, a despairing but useful woman
- Lisa Capella, an Italian, once Lafcadio's model, become cook to the household in her old age
- Fred Rennie, Lafcadio's old assistant, still making his secret paint recipes
- Max Fustian, Lafcadio's biographer and art dealer, a foppish, self-important man
- Albert Campion, an old friend of Belle, an adventurer, detective and universal uncle
- Stanislaus Oates, a senior Scotland Yard man, Campion's friend

== Film, TV or theatrical adaptations ==
It was the basis for the second series of Campion in 1960, with Bernard Horsfall in the title role.

The story was again adapted for television by the BBC, the fourth of eight Campion stories starring Peter Davison as Campion and Andrew Burt as Oates. Originally broadcast as two separate hour-long episodes, the original UK air date was 5 March 1989. The series was shown in the United States by PBS.
