= Herbert Allingham =

English editor and writer (1867–1936)

- Born: Herbert John Allingham; 1867; Kennington, South London, England
- Died: 10 January 1936 (aged 68–69); UK
- Occupations: Editor, writer
- Spouse: Emily Jane Hughes (m. 1902–1936)
- Children: Margery Allingham
- Writing career
- Pen name: Herbert Allingham, Herbert St Clair, David Pitt
- Genre: Pulp fiction

Herbert John Allingham (1867–10 January 1936) was an English editor, journalist, serial pulp fiction writer, husband of writer Emmie Allingham and father of crime novelist Margery Allingham.

== Early life ==
Herbert John Allingham was born in Kennington, South London in 1867, the second of eight sons of James William Allingham (then a printer) and his wife, Louisa. When aged 15 he went to University of Cambridge as a non-collegiate student, graduating as BA in 1889.

== Editor ==
In 1874, Allingham's grandfather died. His father used the legacy to found The Christian Globe, a non-denominational penny weekly mainly funded by patent medicine advertising. Allingham edited The Christian Globe for his father. In 1889 he became editor of The London Journal. Later he left journalism to become a freelance pulp fiction writer for both children and adults.

== Writing career ==
In 1886, Allingham's uncle, John Allingham (better known as Ralph Rollington), launched The New Boys' Paper penny weekly, in which Herbert published "Barrington's Fag", a "true tale of school life", initially under the pen name Herbert St Clair. In 1889, Herbert Allingham was named editor of The London Journal, publishing his own story "A Devil of a Woman" in 1893.

In 1906, Herbert Allingham was recognised by Amalgamated Press and began writing stories for Puck, The Jester, Comic Cuts, Chips and The Butterfly. By 1909, readers' enjoyment of Allingham's contrasting serials Plucky Polly Perkins and Driven from Home sent The Butterfly's sales figures soaring. This allowed him to resign from The London Journal (which ceased publication soon afterward) and move his family out of London to The Old Rectory in Layer Breton. From this time until the mid-years of World War I he was hugely productive. His regular editor was Frederick George Cordwell, a major influence in the development of British comic papers. Whenever Cordwell established a new title, he used Allingham (anonymously) as the lead writer and main attraction. Readers could enjoy Allingham's fiction on at least four days of every week.

In 1916, Cordwell joined up, paper was rationed and casualties reduced readership of the comics. Allingham found work at Woman's Weekly often under pseudonyms. In 1918, financial hardship forced Allingham to lease thirteen of his most successful titles which were then anonymously syndicated across D. C. Thomson & Co. Ltd regional papers. In 1919, Cordwell returned to Amalgamated Press and founded a new comic with Allingham once again as lead author. In 1920 many of his stories were reprinted in film-themed magazines. In 1926 Amalgamated Press was sold, Allingham's rates of pay were slashed and his work on the comics dried up as tastes changed.

The hard times of the early 1930s unexpectedly reversed Allingham's personal circumstances. He became the lead fiction writer on two big-selling Amalgamated Press publications, The Family Journal and The Home Companion. Many of his pre-war serials were hastily revised and re-issued and the editor (Anne St John Cooper) took as much new work as he was able to produce. Anonymity disguised the fact that Allingham's stories were running without a break, sometimes two or three at a time, for the next six years. In 1932, he was able to buy a small house at Thorpe Bay in Essex. In 1935, he fell ill and retired, living off borrowings against reprint rights. When he died in 1936, his stories ran on into the autumn of 1937 when his debt had been fully repaid. Then they stopped.

== Personal life ==
In 1902 Allingham married his first cousin, Emily Jane Hughes, who also wrote (as Emmie Allingham). Their daughter, Margery (1904–1966) was a noted writer.

== Bibliography ==
- (as Herbert St Clair) "Barrington's Fag: A true tale of school life", The New Boys’ Paper, 1886
- "A Devil of a Woman", The London Journal, 1893
- (as David Pitt) Boys' adventure serials for True Blue
- "Plucky Polly Perkins" and "Driven from Home", The Butterfly, 1909
- Commissions for women's magazines The Happy Home and My Weekly, 1914
- Commissions for Woman's Weekly 1916
- The Call of the Road, 1921
