= Police at the Funeral =

Novel by Margery Allingham

- First edition
- Author: Margery Allingham
- Language: English
- Series: Albert Campion
- Genre: Crime novel
- Publisher: Heinemann
- Publication date: 1931
- Publication place: United Kingdom
- Media type: Print (hardcover)
- Preceded by: Look to the Lady
- Followed by: Sweet Danger

Police at the Funeral is a crime novel by Margery Allingham, first published in October 1931, in the United Kingdom by Heinemann, London and in 1932 in the United States by Doubleday, Doran, New York. It is the fourth novel with the mysterious Albert Campion, aided as usual by his butler/valet/bodyguard Magersfontein Lugg and his policeman friend Stanislaus Oates.

== Plot introduction ==
When Albert Campion is called in by the fiancee of an old college friend to investigate the disappearance of her uncle, he little expects the mysterious spate of death and dangers that follows among the bizarre inhabitants of Socrates Close, Cambridge. He and Stanislaus Oates must tread carefully, and battle some complex family dynamics, to solve the case.

== Plot summary ==
Stanislaus Oates is being followed by a stranger, and runs into his friend Campion in the bizarrest of places. Campion is waiting for a client, Joyce Blount, the fiancee of his solicitor friend Marcus Featherstone, and when she arrives she clearly recognises Oates' stalker, but denies having seen him before. After Campion hears Joyce's story, of the disappearance of her Uncle Andrew on the way home from church, news reaches them that Andrew's murdered body has been found in a stream.

They head to Cambridge, where Campion meets Marcus and hears more about the family of Andrew, his imperious Great-Aunt Caroline and the clutch of feckless relatives who live off her, including Uncle William, who was with Andrew when he went missing, and about the body, found tied up and shot in the head. He meets William, and learns that Oates' mysterious stalker was Cousin George, who visits rarely and has some power over Great-Aunt Caroline.

Next morning, more bad news hits the family; Aunt Julia is found dead in her bed, poisoned by a surreptitious morning cup of tea. Campion heads to the house and meets the famous Caroline Faraday, who hires him to help them resolve matters. Oates analyses the teacup and finds traces of conium poison (hemlock, the poison that was used to execute Socrates, and one of the species in the carrot genus, including dill, and parsnip), while Campion finds a stash of weight-loss pills in Julia's room.

Uncle William approaches Marcus, telling him he has been suffering from blackouts, and Campion also finds the old man's service revolver is missing, along with some cord from the same (unused) room. Later, Campion finds William in the corridor, his hand badly cut; he almost faints, and Campion suspects mild poisoning. He and Oates inspect the scene where Andrew's body was found, but find nothing but an old hat, presumably swapped for Andrew's missing bowler.

Back at the house, there has been another scare; a mysterious symbol like a stylised letter B has been drawn in chalk on one of the library windows. Campion and Oates suspect it is a sign used by tramps to communicate amongst themselves. Great-Aunt Caroline reveals that Andrew had been writing to old girlfriends, and Campion has an idea which could solve the case. He finds Uncle William has an alibi, having been seen in a pub at the time of the murder, in the midst of an amnesia attack, and the inquest into Andrew's death returns a verdict of murder.

Cousin George arrives at the house, and denounces his family, claiming to know who killed Andrew and insisting he be allowed to stay in the house, threatening to bring scandal on the family. He gets drunk and is locked in Andrew's room by Campion and Marcus. In the night, Campion spots a man in the gardens, and tackles him; he is a large-footed tramp named Beveridge.

In the morning, Campion is missing, and George is found dead in his bed, with a strong smell of cyanide in the room. When Campion and Oates arrive, Campion explains all – Andrew, watched secretly by George and his friend Beveridge, bound and then shot himself, arranging for the gun to fall from the bridge. George hid the gun in a tree and Beveridge took Andrew's hat. Andrew had previously placed several booby-traps around the house, including the poisoned pill which killed Julia, a hidden blade which cut William, and a cyanide-stuffed pipe which killed George.

Campion leaves the house with everyone's gratitude, and some gifts.

The device Uncle Andrew used is similar to one in a Sherlock Holmes story The Problem of Thor Bridge.

== Characters in "Police at the Funeral" ==
- Albert Campion, a mysterious adventurer of noble blood
- Magersfontein Lugg, Campion's servant, an ex-criminal
- Marcus Featherstone, friend of Campion, engaged to Joyce, lawyer and son of the family lawyer Hugh Featherstone
- "Great Aunt" Caroline Faraday, the powerful widow of a renowned academic, Dr. John Faraday
- Uncle William Faraday, Caroline's son, a bluff old man
- Aunt Julia Faraday, Caroline's daughter, an overweight, lazy woman, "spinster of the parish"
- Aunt Catherine "Kitty" Berry, Caroline's daughter, a widow, prone to hysterics
- Joyce Blount, Kitty's niece by marriage, engaged to Marcus
- Uncle Andrew Seeley, Caroline's nephew, a cantankerous fellow, who disappears at the start
- Cousin George Faraday, the black sheep of the family, a reprobate
- Stanislaus Oates, a senior Scotland Yard man, Campion's friend

== Television ==
The story was faithfully adapted for television by the BBC, the second of eight Campion stories starring Peter Davison as Campion and Brian Glover as Lugg. The film also featured Mary Morris (in her last role; she died some months before it was broadcast) as Great-aunt Caroline and Timothy West as William. Originally broadcast as two separate hour-long episodes, the original UK air date was 5 February 1989. The series was shown in the United States by PBS.

== Editions ==
- Allingham, Margery (1987). Police at the Funeral. London: Penguin Books. ISBN 0-14-008780-X.
- Allingham, Margery (2007). Police at the Funeral. London: Vintage Books, Random House. ISBN 978-0-09-950734-5.
