= The Fashion in Shrouds =

1938 novel by Margery Allingham

- First edition (US)
- Author: Margery Allingham
- Language: English
- Series: Albert Campion
- Genre: Crime fiction
- Publisher: Heinemann
- Publication date: 1938
- Publication place: United Kingdom
- Media type: Print (hardback and paperback)
- Preceded by: Dancers in Mourning
- Followed by: Traitor's Purse

The Fashion in Shrouds is a crime novel by English writer Margery Allingham. It was originally published in 1938 in the United Kingdom by Heinemann, London and in the United States by Doubleday, New York. It is the tenth novel in the Albert Campion series.

== Plot introduction ==
Richard Portland-Smith disappeared without a trace three years ago – now Albert Campion has found his skeleton. The investigation of his suicide leads to Portland-Smith's former fiancee, the actress Georgia Wells, and to a series of deaths, apparently caused by "the hand of fate", but always in Georgia's interest. Campion's involvement is more than just professional – this case involves his sister Valentine, Georgia's best friend.

== Plot summary ==
Campion asks his sister, fashion designer Valentine Ferris, to introduce him to her best friend and most important client, Georgia Wells, a famous actress. Campion has been investigating the disappearance of Georgia's former fiance, barrister Richard Portland-Smith, three years previously. Now Campion has found Portland-Smith's skeleton.

Campion meets Georgia and her entourage, including her unpleasant, possibly dangerous husband Raymond Ramillies, at the unveiling of the costumes Val has made for Georgia's new play. He also meets Alan Dell, the man Val is in love with, who admits to an admiration for Georgia. The event ends in a fashion disaster when it emerges that the design for the main dress has been leaked and copied. The house model Caroline Adamson, chosen for her resemblance to Georgia, is responsible.

Georgia knows about Portland-Smith's death but she is shocked when Campion tells her it was suicide, not murder – she asks Dell to drive her home instead of her husband Ramillies.

Several weeks later, Val tells Campion that Georgia has stolen Dell from her. Besides admitting that she wants Georgia dead, she is worried that Ramillies has been behaving unpredictably and might attack Dell.

Then Lady Amanda Fitton (Sweet Danger), who now works as an engineer at Dell's aircraft factory, asks for Campion's help to find out why Dell is neglecting his work. Campion takes her to a restaurant where they see Dell with Georgia. Ramillies arrives with Caroline Adamson, dressed up exactly like Georgia, to provoke a confrontation. But the situation is miraculously defused by various friends of those concerned – stage-managed by Georgia's manager, Ferdie Paul.

To distract Dell from the embarrassing situation, Amanda tells him she is engaged to Campion – to Campion's surprise.

Ramillies is due to return to Ulangi, the African colony of which he is governor, in a gold-painted plane, a gift to a local ruler. He is leaving from Caesar's Court, a luxury resort outside London, run by Gaiogi Laminoff.

Ramilies disappears after an official dinner and does not return until the afternoon of the next day – he says he has been drinking all night. When the flight is due to take off, he cannot be found – he is eventually found dead in the plane.

The officials attempt to smooth over his death and a doctor is ready to give a certificate that he died of natural causes, but then Georgia mentions that she gave him a painkiller to take which Val had given her for herself. When a post mortem is carried out there is no evidence of unnatural death. However, the rumour that Val tried to poison Georgia because they fell out over Alan Dell becomes widespread society gossip.

Caroline Adamson contacts Campion with information but fails to turn up for their appointment. Then Stanislaus Oates calls Campion in to Scotland Yard – Caroline has been stabbed and her body dumped in the countryside.

Sinclair, Georgia's young son, tells Campion and Amanda that Ramillies was actually terrified of flying, but that he knew of an injection which would make him feel ill for four hours, then feel fine for the flight. Campion thinks this is how he was killed.

As the police close in on Val because of the painkiller story, Campion tracks down the men who dumped Caroline's body. They run a restaurant which provides accommodation for various criminal activities – they are not saying who killed Caroline and they have destroyed all the evidence.

Amanda gives a party to celebrate breaking off her engagement to Campion – she is calm about it, but he seems upset. Campion tells everybody what he has found out – that Portland-Smith was blackmailed by Caroline and an accomplice until he killed himself, that Ramillies was given an unknown drug which killed him, and that Caroline was murdered when she tried to blackmail her former accomplice. Then he argues with Amanda, throws her in the river, and leaves.

Alan Dell apologises to Val and asks her to marry him – she accepts.

Campion visits Ferdie Paul and explains that the crimes were carried out for Georgia's sake. Ferdie Paul leaves for Caesar's Court to confront Gaiogi Laminoff, who he says is Georgia's father. A message asks Campion to follow, but on the way he is knocked out and taken to Amanda's cottage where he is placed with his head in the gas oven to fake his suicide. But at the vital moment, the police burst in – Campion has arranged in advance for them to follow him. Ferdie Paul is revealed as the man who tried to kill him, and he was also responsible for the other deaths.

Campion recovers. Now that the fake engagement is over, Amanda asks for her ring back – Campion says he will marry her if she wants.

== Characters ==
- Albert Campion
- Magersfontein Lugg, his "gentleman's gentleman", and ex-burglar
- Valentine Ferris (Val), Campion's sister, a fashion designer
- Marthe Papendeik ("Tante Marthe"), Val's employer, friend of Val and Campion's mother
- Caroline Adamson, a model employed by Papendeik's
- Georgia Wells, a famous actress
- Raymond Ramillies, Georgia's husband, governor of a British colony in Africa
- Sinclair, Georgia's son by a previous marriage.
- Ferdie Paul, Georgia's manager and theatrical impresario
- Anna Fitch, Ferdie Paul's mistress
- Gaiogi Laminoff, manager of Caesar's Court
- Alan Dell, aircraft designer
- Lady Amanda Fitton, aircraft engineer employed by Dell, old friend of Campion
- Stanislaus Oates, Scotland Yard inspector and friend of Campion
