= The Mind Readers =

1965 novel by Margery Allingham

- First edition
- Author: Margery Allingham
- Language: English
- Series: Albert Campion
- Genre: Crime novel
- Publisher: Chatto & Windus
- Publication date: 1965
- Publication place: United Kingdom
- Media type: Print (Hardback & Paperback)
- Preceded by: The China Governess
- Followed by: Cargo of Eagles

The Mind Readers is a crime novel by Margery Allingham, first published in 1965, in the United Kingdom by Chatto & Windus, London. It is the eighteenth novel in the Albert Campion series.

== Plot introduction ==
Canon Avril is looking forward to hosting Albert Campion and his wife Lady Amanda for half-term, with their nephew Edward, and his cousin Sam. But strange things are happening at the electronics establishment on a remote island on the east coast where Sam's father works, and when the boys arrive at Liverpool Street Station an attempt is made to kidnap them. Then Edward goes missing, and Campion and DS Charles Luke find themselves caught up in a mystery, unexpectedly helped by a certain Thomas T. Knapp, a disreputable old acquaintance.
