= The Crime at Black Dudley =

Novel by Margery Allingham

- First edition
- Author: Margery Allingham
- Language: English
- Series: Albert Campion
- Genre: Crime novel
- Publisher: Jarrolds Publishing
- Publication date: 1929
- Publication place: United Kingdom
- Media type: Print (hardcover)
- Followed by: Mystery Mile

The Crime at Black Dudley, also known in the United States as The Black Dudley Murder, is a crime novel by Margery Allingham, first published in 1929, in the United Kingdom by Jarrolds, London and in the United States by Doubleday Doran, New York. It introduces Albert Campion, her misleadingly vapid detective, who would go on to appear in another 18 novels and many short stories over the next 30 years.

== Plot introduction ==
A house party is under way at the remote Black Dudley, and among the guests are some very shady characters. As they merrily recreate the ritual of the Black Dudley Dagger, Colonel Coombe dies. Pathologist George Abbershaw suspects foul play, and when a vital item is mislaid, a gang of crooks hold the guests hostage. Will they escape the house – what did happen to the Colonel – and just who is the mysterious Mr Campion?

== Plot summary ==
The story begins as the guests assemble for dinner on the first night of a house party. Black Dudley is a remote, ancient and sprawling manor house with a long and complex history, its numerous changes of use resulting in plenty of hidden rooms and secret passages. The pile is owned by the family of Wyatt Petrie, a popular young academic, and inhabited by his uncle by marriage, Colonel Coombe, a sickly recluse who wears a mask to cover unsightly scars. The bulk of the guests are young friends of Petrie – among them our red-headed hero George Abbershaw, pathologist and occasional consultant to Scotland Yard, and similarly flame-haired Meggie, whom he shyly admires. The Colonel's medic Doctor White Whitby, and two of his associates, a shifty Englishman named Gideon and an imposing but silent foreigner going by the name of Benjamin Dawlish, are also present. So is one Albert Campion, garrulous and affable, but, George soon learns, unknown to either Petrie or the Colonel.

After dinner, the guests notice a sinister, bejewelled dagger hanging above the fireplace; Petrie tells them a story of its ancient origins in the family, and mentions a ritual involving the dagger being passed from hand to hand round the darkened house. The guests are keen to play the game, so the servants are dismissed, the lights extinguished and the ritual begins.

Abbershaw, not excited at the prospect of people waving daggers around in the dark, slips outside to check on his car; in the garage, he finds the mysterious Mr Campion loitering around. Admiring the Colonel's ancient car, they find it has been converted to contain a powerful Rolls-Royce engine. The two head back into the house to see the end of the game, and find Meggie in a state of shock. The knife was handed to her at some point, and then snatched away again, but not before she realised the blade was covered in blood.

When the lights are finally restored, they hear the Colonel has fallen ill and has been taken to bed. The party breaks up for the night, but as George prepares for bed he is visited by Prenderby, a young newly qualified doctor, who has been shown Coombe's body and been asked by Doctor Whitby to sign forms allowing a rapid cremation, but, nervous and suspicious, has refused. Abbershaw is next to be asked, and entering the room he at once pulls the sheet from the bed. Although there are no obvious signs of foul play, Abbershaw's experience tells him the man did not die of heart failure, as Whitby claims. Also, his mask has slipped, revealing an unmarked face beneath. Abbershaw is forced to sign the forms, but plans to wire London the next day, to delay the cremation until a proper investigation can be carried out.

Later that night, the house is woken by loud noises, and they find Campion fighting wildly with one of the servants. Abbershaw finds a leather case on the ground, which he later opens, burning the document it contains and secreting the case. He talks with Meggie and her friend Anne, finding that Campion had met Anne in London, informed her he was invited to the party and got a lift down in her car.

The next day, Whitby and the chauffeur depart early with the body. At breakfast, the imposing Mr Dawlish makes a stark announcement – the cars have been drained of fuel, and no-one is to leave the house until something he has lost is returned to him. A brave young rugby-player attempts to escape in a car powered by alcohol, but is shot and wounded.

Campion, having mocked their captors, disappears, but later materialises, dusty and shaken, in Abbershaw's wardrobe. He tells them he has been roughly interrogated and locked up, but escaped through a secret passage, and also that he came to the house on a mission from an unknown, to collect an item from the Colonel and return to London with it. He retrieved the item, but was prevented from leaving by Abbershaw's presence in the garage, and then lost it in the fight with the chauffeur. He has also recognised the crooks, and names Dawlish as Eberhard von Faber, the head of a powerful criminal gang, one of the deadliest men in Europe.

Abbershaw hears that Meggie has been taken for questioning, and angered at the thought of the villains mistreating her, he uses Campion's passage to reach their lair. He too is questioned, and then locked up with Meggie. They speak to an eccentric servant locked up next door, and find that the criminals were as surprised as anyone at the Colonel's death. Campion releases them, and they form a plan to overpower the villains. After much fighting and danger, they retake the house, and are about to flee to safety when the chief villains return and recapture them.

Abbershaw reveals that he has burned their document, the plans for an audacious crime, and the party is locked upstairs, while the gang prepare to leave the house, leaving it on fire with the guests trapped inside. Just in time, the local hunt ride by, with a friend of Campion's among them. Hearing the prisoners' cries for help, the hunt rides up, are incensed by the German's behaviour, and, as he tries to flee, cause his car to crash, crushing him.

The party breaks up and all return to London, where Campion impresses Abbershaw with the name of his mother before disappearing. Abbershaw, Prenderby and another man from the party find the converted car, and follow it to find Dr Whitby and the chauffeur about to flee the country by air. He denies killing the Colonel, and departs.

Abbershaw, after some thought and research, pays a visit to the killer – Petrie himself. Having fallen in love with a young girl, he found she was the puppet of evil criminals, and enraged by their treatment of her, he resolved to track them down. When he found his own uncle was one of them, he felt he had no choice but to slay him, inventing the dagger ritual to give him the chance. Abbershaw lets him go, on condition he enters a monastery.

== Characters in "The Crime at Black Dudley" ==
- Dr George Abbershaw, a pathologist occasionally consulted by Scotland Yard
- Wyatt Petrie, host of the party at Black Dudley, a gifted scholar
- Colonel Gordon Coombe, Petrie's uncle, a mask-wearing recluse
- Dr. White Whitby, Coombe's medical man
- Jesse Gideon, an associate of Coombe, a shifty-looking fellow
- Benjamin Dawlish, aka Eberhard Von Faber, another associate of Coombe, a stone-faced German
- Margaret "Meggie" Oliphant, a flame-haired party guest, adored by George
- Anne Edgeware, a beautiful and flirtatious party guest
- Michael Prenderby, another guest, a newly qualified doctor
- Chris Kennedy, another guest, a Cambridge rugby blue
- Martin Watt, another guest at the party
- Albert Campion, an amiable, foolish-looking party-crasher
- Daisy May Meade, a local woman employed at the house
- "Guffy" Randall, a huntsman, a friend of Campion
- Jeanne Dacre, another party guest and Prenderby's fiancée

== Literary significance & criticism ==
The hero of The Crime at Black Dudley is George Abbershaw; Campion starts as a minor character, and grows far faster than the other characters do. This is most evident when Allingham takes time to explain when and why Abbershaw changes, while Campion's development seems to happen naturally.

Apparently, Allingham intended Abbershaw to be the hero/sleuth of this book and any future mysteries. He is, after all, a pathologist, and that could lead to many interesting stories. Campion got in the way and became a far more memorable character, so much so that the American publishers strongly encouraged Allingham to focus on Campion.

Even in this first Campion novel, there are hints of his willingness to work outside the law. Though he and Scotland Yard are familiar with one another, it is clear that he is not working in any official capacity. Abbershaw had even encountered Campion before, although Campion was using a different name.

Campion's mysterious past is also brought out. He admits to using a number of names, and that Campion is not his real one (Mystery Mile has more information). Campion goes so far as to mention the name of his mother to Abbershaw, who is struck speechless by the revealed name. Could he be one of Edward VII's illegitimate children? He never really hints at who his father was, and to British readers in the late 1920s the thought may have been natural.

If Campion was developed to poke fun at other sleuths, most notably Dorothy Sayers' Lord Peter Wimsey, The Crime at Black Dudley shows a glimmer of a character that will stand very much on his own.
