= The Tiger in the Smoke =

Novel by Margery Allingham

- First edition
- Author: Margery Allingham
- Language: English
- Series: Albert Campion
- Genre: Crime novel
- Publisher: Chatto & Windus
- Publication date: 1952
- Publication place: United Kingdom
- Media type: Print (hardback and paperback)
- Preceded by: More Work for the Undertaker
- Followed by: The Beckoning Lady

The Tiger in the Smoke is a crime novel by Margery Allingham, first published in 1952 in the United Kingdom by Chatto & Windus and in the United States by Doubleday. It is the fourteenth novel in the Albert Campion series. Critics have called it the finest of the Campion mysteries and her best book.

Author J. K. Rowling described the novel as phenomenal.

== Plot ==
Meg Elginbrodde is a young war widow whose husband, Martin Elginbrodde, was presumed killed during the D-Day landings and who is now engaged to marry Geoffrey Levett. As their wedding date nears, she begins receiving mysterious photographs that suggest her first husband is still alive. As a thick and overwhelming pea soup fog begins to descend upon London, she meets with London Police Inspector Charlie Luke and her cousin, the detective Albert Campion, to find an individual who claims to know her first husband's whereabouts. Meg appears to recognise a man disembarking from a train as her husband, but when apprehended the man is revealed to be a recently paroled convict called "Duds" Morrison who has somehow acquired an old, distinctive coat that belonged to her first husband. Duds is arrested but soon released without charge.

Unknown to the others, Meg's new fiancé Geoffrey Levett, who is desperate to know whether Martin Elginbrodde is still alive, accosts Duds and tries to bribe him for information regarding Meg's first husband. Before he can learn anything, the two men are attacked by a gang of criminals. The gang demand that Duds reveal the whereabouts of Duds's employer, a man they call "the Gaffer", who they claim has cheated them out of something valuable. When Duds tries to flee, the gang attack him, and the gang leader, Tiddy Doll, accidentally kills him. The gang, thinking that Levett knows the Gaffer, kidnap him.

Investigating how Duds acquired the coat, Meg's father Canon Avril discovers that a member of his household staff gave it to Mrs Lucy Cash, a local loan shark, to settle a debt. Levett's inexplicable disappearance begins to arouse suspicion that he is involved in the murder of Duds. During the investigation, three people, including a young police detective, are stabbed to death in a nearby house, triggering a public outcry. The murderer is quickly identified as Jack Havoc, a violent and mysterious convict who recently escaped from jail. Learning that Havoc served with Martin Elginbrodde during the war, Campion and Luke conclude that Havoc is "the Gaffer".

While the gang are debating what to do with the kidnapped Geoffrey Levett, Havoc—their wartime sergeant—unexpectedly joins them. Although Havoc still holds a powerful thrall over the gang, Tiddy Doll realises that Havoc needs their help, because Havoc's reckless actions have earned the wrath of both the police and the criminal underworld. Havoc reveals that, during a confidential mission in occupied France during the war, Elginbrodde told him that the house the unit was infiltrating was his family home and that a great treasure had been located there. In the event of his death, the treasure would be inherited by Meg. Elginbrodde had written a letter revealing the treasure's exact location, and Havoc was seeking the letter. The connections between himself and Elginbrodde have convinced Havoc of the existence of what he calls "the Science of Luck" and his all-consuming belief that he is destined to have the treasure has driven all his ruthless actions.

Tiddy Doll, who is paranoid that Levett can identify him as the murderer of Duds, attempts to manipulate Havoc into revealing too much in front of Levett, which would give Havoc a reason to murder Levett. Before this can happen, however, Campion finds their hideout, forcing the gang to make a swift retreat and leave Levett behind to be rescued. Levett, Campion, Amanda and Meg go to Martin Elginbrodde's childhood home in France to search for the treasure.

After a conversation with Inspector Luke, who suspects a connection between Havoc and Mrs Cash, Canon Avril realises that Havoc's true identity is Johnny Cash, the son of Mrs Cash who had previously been thought dead. In fact, Mrs Cash had blackmailed Avril's now-deceased wife, who was in debt to her, to help her pretend to bury her son, rather than face the public humiliation of admitting that he had been sent to prison. Avril realizes that Havoc has been secretly hiding in the crypt of the church and goes to talk to him. During their confrontation, they have a philosophical conversation about Havoc's belief in the "Science of Luck", which shares some similarity to Avril's own philosophy of life. After revealing the location of the treasure, Avril tries to persuade Havoc to abandon his murderous path. Havoc attacks Avril in response—but the old priest's words have shaken his self-confidence, leading Havoc to atypically only wound Avril instead of killing him.

Havoc and the remaining gang members follow Campion and the others to France and the now-known location of the treasure, closely pursued by Inspector Luke and the French police. Shortly after their arrival, all of the gang except Havoc are killed or arrested by police. On reaching the place where the treasure is hidden, an exhausted Havoc encounters Meg trying to retrieve the treasure herself. Not recognising her childhood bully, Meg asks for his help in removing the treasure, which the two manage to accomplish. The treasure turns out to be a pristine mediaeval ivory sculpture of the Madonna and Child. Meg is moved to tears, but Havoc is horrified by the realisation that his quest has been all for nothing— the piece's uniqueness makes it impossible to sell off illicitly. A broken man, he dies while fleeing the police.

== Film ==
The story was adapted for a 1956 film Tiger in the Smoke starring Donald Sinden, Muriel Pavlow, Bernard Miles (in an unusual role as a villain), and Tony Wright, but omitting the central character of Campion and handing his dialogue and scenes to other characters, particularly Inspector Luke, and changing the ending.
