= More Work for the Undertaker =

1948 novel by Margery Allingham

- First edition
- Author: Margery Allingham
- Language: English
- Series: Albert Campion
- Genre: Crime novel
- Publisher: William Heinemann
- Publication date: 1948
- Publication place: United Kingdom
- Media type: Print (Hardback & Paperback)
- Preceded by: Coroner's Pidgin
- Followed by: The Tiger in the Smoke

More Work for the Undertaker is a crime novel by Margery Allingham, first published in 1948, in the United Kingdom by William Heinemann, London and in the United States by Doubleday, New York. It is the thirteenth novel in the Albert Campion series.

The book focuses on Apron Street, an isolated neighbourhood in London. Going "up Apron street" has become a byword for a criminal vanishing. This proves to be done by the Bowels family, the undertakers of the title. More sinister proves to be the effort of the local banker to eliminate the eccentric Palinode family, which has inherited shares of stock once thought worthless. The banker proves also to be the moving force behind the service the Bowels family runs for criminals.

== Note on the Title ==
Allingham may have taken the title from a comical music-hall song More Work for the Undertaker written in 1895 by Fred W. Leigh (1871 - 1924)

The chorus of this song is traditionally sung by Yale when they are winning against Harvard.
