= Margery Allingham =

English editor and novelist (1904–1966)

- Born: Margery Louise Allingham; 20 May 1904; Ealing, London, UK
- Died: 30 June 1966 (aged 62); Colchester, Essex, England
- Occupation: Novelist
- Spouse: Philip Youngman Carter
- Parent(s): Herbert Allingham and Emmie Allingham
- Writing career
- Pen name: Margery Allingham; Maxwell March
- Period: 1923–1966
- Genres: Mystery, crime fiction

Margery Louise Allingham (20 May 1904 – 30 June 1966) was an English novelist from the "Golden Age of Detective Fiction", and considered one of its four "Queens of Crime", alongside Agatha Christie, Dorothy L. Sayers and Ngaio Marsh.

Allingham is best remembered for her hero, the gentleman sleuth Albert Campion, who first appeared in her novel The Crime at Black Dudley (1929). Initially believed to be a parody of Dorothy L. Sayers's detective Lord Peter Wimsey, Campion matured into a strongly individual character, part-detective, part-adventurer, who formed the basis for 18 novels and many short stories.

== Early life ==
Margery Louise Allingham was born on 20 May 1904 in Ealing, London, the eldest daughter of Herbert Allingham (1868–1936) and Emily Jane (née Hughes; 1879–1960). She had a younger brother, Philip William, and a younger sister Emily Joyce Allingham, former WRNS member and amateur filmmaker.

Her family was immersed in literature; her parents were both writers. Her father was editor of the Christian Globe and The New London Journal, to which Margery later contributed articles and Sexton Blake stories, and he had become a successful pulp fiction writer, and her mother, as Emmie Allingham, was a contributor of stories to women's magazines, including The Exploits of Phinella Martin, stories of a lady detective which ran in Woman's Weekly from 1915 to 1920.

Soon after Margery's birth the family left London for Essex, where they lived in an old house in Layer Breton, a village near Colchester.

She attended a local school and then the Perse School for Girls in Cambridge, all the while writing stories and plays. She earned her first fee at the age of eight, for a story printed in her aunt's magazine.

Upon returning to London in 1920 she studied drama and speech training at Regent Street Polytechnic, which helped her manage a stammer which she had since childhood. At this time she first met her future husband, Philip Youngman Carter, whom she married in 1927. He collaborated with her in plotting her stories, particularly those written between the wars, and designed the jackets for many of her books.

== Career ==
=== Early writings ===
While she was enrolled at the Regent Street Polytechnic she wrote a verse play, Dido and Aeneas, which was performed at St. George's Hall, London, and the Cripplegate Theatre, London. Allingham played the role of Dido and the scenery was designed by her future husband, Philip Youngman Carter.

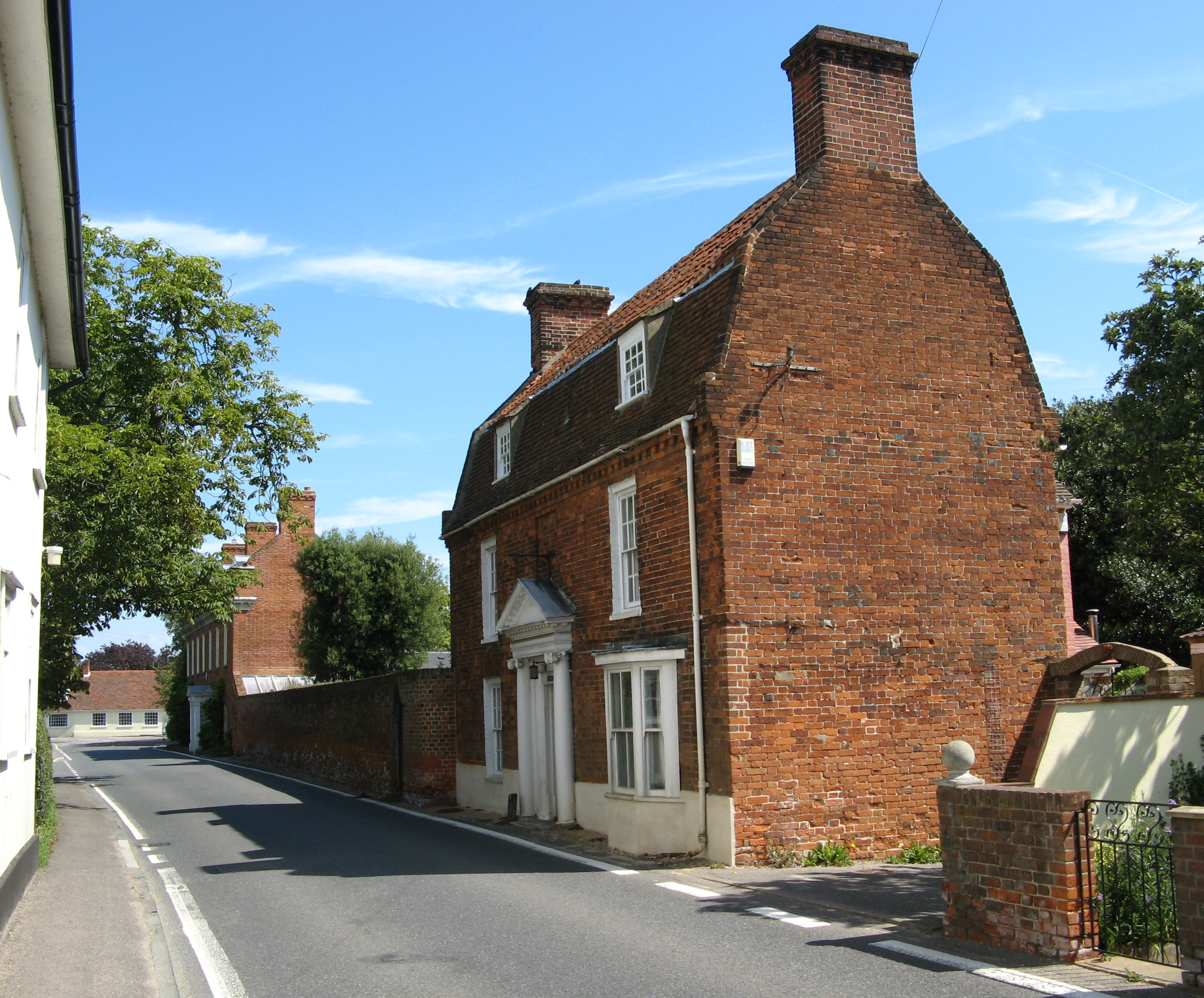
South Street, Tolleshunt D'Arcy: Allingham and Carter lived in the far house

Her first novel, Blackkerchief Dick, was published in 1923, when she was 19. It was allegedly based on a story she had heard during a séance, though later in life this was debunked by her husband. Nevertheless, Allingham continued to include occult themes in many of her novels. Blackkerchief Dick was well received, but was not a financial success. She wrote several plays in this period and attempted to write a serious novel, but finding that her themes clashed with her natural light-heartedness, she decided instead to try the mystery genre.

=== Campion and success ===
Her breakthrough occurred in 1929 with the publication of The Crime at Black Dudley. This introduced Albert Campion, initially as a minor character, thought to be a parody of Dorothy Sayers' Lord Peter Wimsey. Campion returned in Mystery Mile, thanks in part to pressure from her American publishers, who had been taken with the character.

With a strong central character and a format to work in, she began to produce a series of Campion novels. At first she also continued writing short stories and articles for magazines such as The Strand Magazine, but as her Campion saga went on her sales grew steadily. Campion proved so successful that Allingham made him the centrepiece of another 17 novels and more than 20 short stories, continuing into the 1960s.

Campion is a mysterious upper-class character (early novels hint that his family is in the line of succession to the throne), working under an assumed name. He floats between the upper echelons of the nobility and government on the one hand, and the shady world of the criminal class on the other, often accompanied by his scurrilous ex-burglar servant Magersfontein Lugg. During the course of his career Campion is sometimes a detective, sometimes an adventurer.

The first three Campion novels, The Crime at Black Dudley, Mystery Mile and Look to the Lady, were all written by what Allingham referred to as the "plum pudding" method, focused less on methods of murder or the formal strictures of the whodunit and more on mixing possibilities together. As the series progresses, however, Campion comes to work more closely with the police and MI6 counter-intelligence. He also falls in love, gets married and has a child, and as time goes by he grows in wisdom and matures emotionally.

The style and format of the books moved on: while the early novels are light-hearted whodunnits or "fantastical" adventures, The Tiger in the Smoke (1952) is more a character study than a crime novel, focusing on the serial killer Jack Havoc. In many of the later books Campion plays a subsidiary role, no more prominent than the roles of his wife Amanda and his police associates, and in the last novel he is a minor character.

In 1941 Allingham published a non-fiction work, The Oaken Heart, which describes her experiences in Essex when an invasion from Germany was expected and actively being planned for, potentially placing the civilian population of Essex in the front line.

== Death ==
Allingham suffered from breast cancer and died at Severalls Hospital, Colchester, England, on 30 June 1966, aged 62. Her final Campion novel, Cargo of Eagles, was completed by her husband at her request, and was published in 1968. She was cared for through her illness by her sister, who avoided the topic in her films depicting their home life as well as ensuring her husband was not inconvenienced by it.

Compilations of her work, both with and without Albert Campion, continued to be published in the 1960s and 1970s. The Margery Allingham Omnibus, comprising Sweet Danger, The Case of the Late Pig and The Tiger in the Smoke, with a critical introduction by Jane Stevenson, was published in 2006.

Allingham was buried in the newer cemetery in Tolleshunt D'Arcy.

== Legacy ==
A film version of The Tiger in the Smoke was made in 1956 (though Campion does not appear in the film), and a highly popular series of Campion adaptations was shown by the BBC in 1989–90. It is titled simply Campion and stars Peter Davison as Campion and Brian Glover as Lugg.

Several books have been written about Allingham and her work, including:

- Margery Allingham: 100 Years of a Great Mystery Writer edited by Marianne van Hoeven (2003)
- Margery Allingham: A Biography by Julia Thorogood (1991); revised as The Adventures of Margery Allingham as by Julia Jones (2009).
- Ink in Her Blood: The Life and Crime Fiction of Margery Allingham by Richard Martin (1988)
- Campion's Career: A Study of the Novels of Margery Allingham by B.A. Pike (1987)

Further Campion adventures have been written by Mike Ripley. The first of these, Mr Campion's Farewell, was based on notes left at his death by Allingham's husband, Philip Youngman Carter; all the rest have been originals.

== Bibliography ==
=== Albert Campion novels and short stories ===
Title	Author	Year
The Crime at Black Dudley; US title: The Black Dudley Murder	Margery Allingham	1929
Mystery Mile	Margery Allingham	1930
Look to the Lady; US title: The Gyrth Chalice Mystery	Margery Allingham	1931
Police at the Funeral	Margery Allingham	1931
Sweet Danger; US titles: Kingdom of Death / The Fear Sign	Margery Allingham	1933
Death of a Ghost	Margery Allingham	1934
Flowers for the Judge; US title: Legacy in Blood	Margery Allingham	1936
Dancers in Mourning; US title: Who Killed Chloe?	Margery Allingham	1937
Mr. Campion: Criminologist (compilation of short stories): The Case of the Late Pig (novelet); "The Border-Line Case"; "The Case of the Man with the Sack"; "The Case of the Old Man in the Window"; "The Case of the Pro and the Con"; "The Case of the White Elephant"; "The Case of the Widow"	Margery Allingham	1937
The Case of the Late Pig (originally appeared in Mr Campion: Criminologist)	Margery Allingham	1937
The Fashion in Shrouds	Margery Allingham	1938
Mr. Campion and Others (compilation of short stories): "The Widow"; "The Name on the Wrapper"; "The Hat Trick"; "The Question Mark"; "The Old Man in the Window"; "The White Elephant"; "The Frenchman's Gloves"; "The Longer View"; "Safe as Houses"; "The Definite Article"; "The Meaning of the Act"; "A Matter of Form"; "The Danger Point"	Margery Allingham	1939
Traitor's Purse; US title: The Sabotage Murder Mystery	Margery Allingham	1941
Coroner's Pidgin; US title: Pearls Before Swine	Margery Allingham	1945
The Casebook of Mr Campion (compilation of short stories): "The Case of the Question Mark"; "The Crimson Letter"; "The Definite Article"; "The Magic Hat"; "A Matter of Form"; "The Meaning of the Act"; "Safe as Houses"	Margery Allingham	1947
More Work for the Undertaker	Margery Allingham	1948
The Tiger in the Smoke; Serialized in US newspapers as Tiger Loose. Serialized in the UK in John Bull (1952)	Margery Allingham	1952
The Beckoning Lady; US title: The Estate of the Beckoning Lady	Margery Allingham	1955
Hide My Eyes; US titles: Tether's End / Ten Were Missing	Margery Allingham	1958
The China Governess	Margery Allingham	1963
The Mind Readers	Margery Allingham	1965
Cargo of Eagles (completed by Philip Youngman Carter after Allingham's death)	Margery Allingham; Philip Youngman Carter	1968
Mr. Campion's Farthing	Philip Youngman Carter	1969
Mr. Campion's Falcon; US title: Mr. Campion's Quarry	Philip Youngman Carter	1970
The Allingham Minibus (also known as Mr. Campion's Lucky Day) (compilation of short stories): "The Barbarian"; "Bird Thou Never Wert"; "The Correspondents"; "He Preferred Them Sad"; "He Was Asking After You"; "The Man with the Sack"; "Mr. Campion's Lucky Day"; "The Perfect Butler"; "Publicity"; "A Quarter of a Million"; "The Same to Us"; "The Secret"; "The Sexton's Wife"; "She Heard It on the Radio"; "'Tis Not Hereafter"; "The Unseen Door"; "The Wink"	Margery Allingham	1973
The Return of Mr. Campion (compilation of short stories): The Beauty King"; "The Black Tent"; "The Case Is Altered"; "The Curious Affair in Nut Row"; "The Dog Day"; "Happy Christmas"; "The Kernel of Truth"; "Once in a Lifetime"; "Sweet and Low"; "What to Do with an Ageing Detective"; "The Wind Glass"; "The Wisdom of Esdras	Margery Allingham	1989
Mr Campion's Farewell (completed by Mike Ripley after Youngman Carter's death)	Philip Youngman Carter; Mike Ripley	2014
Mr Campion's Fox	Mike Ripley	2015
Mr Campion's Fault	Mike Ripley	2016
Mr Campion's Abdication	Mike Ripley	2017
Mr Campion's War	Mike Ripley	2018
Mr Campion's Visit	Mike Ripley	2019
Mr Campion's Seance	Mike Ripley	2020
Mr Campion's Coven	Mike Ripley	2021
Mr Campion's Mosaic	Mike Ripley	2022

=== Short stories and novellas ===
- Formula for Murder.
  This Week, 5 May 1935
- The Great London Jewel Robbery.
  This Week, 27 February 1955
- A Matter of Form
- A Proper Mystery
- Bird Thou Never Wert
- Borderline Case
- Evidence in Camera
- Frenchmen Wear Gloves
- Bluebeard's Bathtub.
  This Week, 23 September 1956
- It Didn't Work Out
- It Needed Someone Innocent.
  Published as Wanted, Someone Innocent
- Miss Amber
- Publicity
- Jubilee for Two
- Safe as Houses
- The Case Is Altered
- The Case of the White Elephant.
  Also published as The White Elephant
- The Correspondents
- The Danger Point
- The Definite Article
- The Dog Day
- The Friend
- The Hat Trick
- The Lieabout
- The Longer View
- The Man with the Sack
- The Meaning of the Act
- The Mistress of the House
- The Name on the Wrapper
- The Old Man in the Window
- The Perfect Butler
- The Pioneers
- The Pro and the Con
- The Question Mark
- The Wind Glass
- They Never Get Caught
- Tis Not Hereafter
- You've Got to Have Brains

=== Non-fiction ===
- Is Golf a Menace to Marriage?
- The Public Spirit of Francis Smith

=== Radio plays ===
- A Corner in Crime
- Room to Let (Nov. 1947)(filmed in 1950)

=== Stage plays ===
- Water in a Sieve

=== Other works by Margery Allingham ===
- Blackkerchief Dick (1923)
- The White Cottage Mystery (1928)
- The Darings of the Red Rose (1930) Published anonymously in the Weekly Welcome magazine
- Black Plumes (1940)
- The Oaken Heart (1941: autobiographical)
- Dance of the Years (1943: also known as The Galantrys)
- Wanted: Someone Innocent (1946: novella and short stories)
  - Wanted: Someone Innocent
  - He Was Asking After You
  - The Sexton's Wife
  - 'Tis Not Hereafter
- Deadly Duo (1949: UK title Take Two at Bedtime (1950)) – two novellas:
  - Wanted: Someone Innocent
  - Last Act
- Take Two at Bedtime (1950) (novellas)
  - Last Act
  - Wanted: Someone Innocent
- No Love Lost (1954) (novellas)
  - The Patient at Peacocks Hall
  - Safer Than Love
- The Allingham Case-Book (1969: short stories)
  - "Black Plumes" (some re-prints)
  - "The Border-Line Case" (Mr. Campion)
  - "Evidence in Camera"
  - "Face Value"
  - "Is There a Doctor in the House?"
  - "Joke Over" (Mr. Campion)
  - "The Lieabout"
  - "Little Miss Know-All" (Mr. Campion)
  - "The Lying-in-State"
  - "The Mind's Eye Mystery"
  - "Mum Knows Best" (Mr. Campion)
  - "One Morning They'll Hang Him" (Mr. Campion)
  - "The Pioneers"
  - "The Pro and the Con" (Mr. Campion)
  - "The Psychologist"
  - "The Snapdragon and the C.I.D." (Mr. Campion)
  - "Tall Story" (Mr. Campion)
  - "They Never Get Caught"
  - "Three Is a Lucky Number"
  - "The Villa Marie Celeste" (Mr. Campion)
- The Darings of the Red Rose (Crippen & Landru, 1995)

=== As Maxwell March (a pseudonym) ===
- Other Man's Danger (1933: US title The Man of Dangerous Secrets)
- Rogues' Holiday (1935)
- The Shadow in the House (1936: US title The Devil and Her Son)
