= Sweet Danger =

Novel by Margery Allingham

- First edition (UK)
- Author: Margery Allingham
- Language: English
- Series: Albert Campion
- Genre: Crime novel
- Publisher: Heinemann (UK); The Crime Club (US)
- Publication date: 1933
- Publication place: United Kingdom
- Media type: Print (hardcover)
- Pages: 286 pp
- OCLC: 56648155
- Preceded by: Police at the Funeral
- Followed by: Death of a Ghost

Sweet Danger is a crime novel by Margery Allingham, first published in October 1933, in the United Kingdom by Heinemann, London and in the United States by The Crime Club as Kingdom of Death; later US versions used the title The Fear Sign. It is the fifth adventure of the mysterious Albert Campion, aided as usual by his butler/valet/bodyguard Magersfontein Lugg, and introduces the recurring character of Amanda Fitton.

== Plot introduction ==
When Averna, a tiny but oil-rich principality on the Adriatic Sea, becomes a vital port after an earthquake, Albert Campion is called in to track down proof that the land belongs to an aristocratic family, believed long died out. With an unscrupulous financier and his hired thugs also on the trail, Campion and his confederates must unravel the mystery, while defending the Fitton family, claimants to the title, in the strange Suffolk village of Pontisbright.

== Plot summary ==
Guffy Randall is surprised to find his old friend Albert Campion in a French hotel, accompanied by Eager-Wright, a mountaineer, and Farquharson, a prospector, masquerading as minor royalty. When Campion explains that they are seeking proof of British rights to a small territory, recently disturbed by an earthquake and turned into a strategically important harbour with its own fuel, Randall joins the team. Following their adversaries, headed by a secretive financier named Savanake, they travel to the village of Pontisbright in Suffolk, former seat of the heirs to the crown of Averna.

They spend a night in the local inn, the Gauntlett, during which Lugg sees a corpse wrapped in a winding cloth on the nearby heath. They move to the local mill, which is run by impoverished Fitton family, who claim to be the lost heirs to the Earldom of Pontisbright: siblings Mary, Amanda, and Hal, and Aunt Hattie. 17-year-old Amanda, the middle child, has an interest in electricity and radio, and runs a generator from the watermill. Aunt Hattie recently disturbed a burglar in the house, who Campion immediately identifies as "Peaky" Doyle, an old associate of Savanake who recently shot at Campion on the continent.

Amanda shows them an ancient inscription on a slab of oak cut from the Pontisbright estate, which speaks of a crown hidden by a split diamond, and other proofs, believed to be the missing deeds and titles, marked by a bell and a drum. Campion and his friends visit Dr Galley, the local medic, a bizarre, eccentric old man who tries to scare them back to London with talk of a curse on the village. Back at the house, they find a drunken Lugg and Scatty Williams, the Fittons' servant, have caught Peaky Doyle breaking into the mill and have beaten him up. He had been found looking at the inscription. Campion reveals that he informed Doyle of the inscription in hopes of getting some help solving the riddle, and insists they leave Doyle unconscious on the heath,

Campion is called to a meeting with Savanake, who insists he take a job in Peru, leaving immediately; when Campion's friends receive a note saying he has run out on them, they resolve to stay to finish the business, but are at a loss as to how to continue. The mill-house is invaded, and everyone left bound and gagged in the dark while it is searched, but they are mysteriously released later.

A letter arrives addressed to Campion, which the men read after Amanda has opened it; it describes a drum belonging to the Pontisbrights, currently in a Norwich museum. Amanda reveals she has come into £300, and plans to buy a car and some radio equipment. When Farquharson and Randall arrive at the museum to retrieve the drum, they find Amanda and Scatty Williams have already taken it.

At the mill, Hal, the youngest Fitton, meets Dr Galley, who tells him he has found evidence that Hal is the Pontisbright heir, and insists they all visit him the following night for dinner. Amanda arrives, and Hal locks her in the grain store, taking the drum. When the others return, he goes to tell them he has it, but when they return to his room the skin is gone from the drum and Amanda is free.

Next morning, Lugg and Scatty leave early in the new car, laden with radio equipment. Two policemen arrive, and take Farquharson and Eager-Wright away, accused of trying to steal the drum from the museum. Aunt Hattie disturbs a man rifling her jewellery, which leads to a gunfight in the yard; the thief is driven back into the house by Campion, dressed as a woman. He explains that he switched with a friend to avoid being sent abroad, and has been hiding in the house, secretly helping out.

He tells them he arranged for the two men to be arrested by friends, so they could safely take the drum-skin to London: it bears information about deeds giving title to Averna. He identifies a necklace of Aunt Hattie's as the ancient crown of Averna, and gives everyone instructions to go to Dr Galley's house and flee by boat when they get his signal. When he hears some stories about Galley from Amanda, he realises the old man is insane and plans to kill his guests. Campion and Amanda rush to Galley's house, arriving just in time to stop him drugging everyone, and Campion heads off on his mission.

Amanda enters Galley's house, and Galley begins a ceremony to conjure a demon. He had tried this before, and had mistaken Peaky Doyle, who arrived during the ceremony, for Astaroth. Galley did Doyle's bidding for a time, until Galley found him unconscious on the heath, from when he believed he had control of the demon, and tried to feed him with bizarre herbs. He unveils Doyle, bizarrely dressed and near death, just as the sound of an enormous bell rings loud around the valley; the others overpower Galley, lock him up and flee in a camouflaged boat prepared by Amanda.

Campion follows an echo of the bell, broadcast by a duplicate of the old Pontisbright bell in a foreign convent and amplified by Amanda's equipment. He finds an old well, but must hide in a tree when Savanake arrives with his well-armed gang. They remove an iron box from the well, but Campion has knocked out Savanake's chauffeur, and driving Savanake and his henchman Parrott away with the box, heads to the mill and gets out, feigning engine trouble.

Campion knocks Parrott out, but Savanake draws a gun on him. Campion knocks the box into the mill-pond, and he and Savanake fight. As Campion is about to drown in Savanake's mighty hands, Amanda opens the sluices of the mill-pond and flushes Savanake away. Campion is exhausted, and Savanake climbs out of the water; Amanda distracts him and grabs the box, but takes a bullet from Savanake's gun as she shuts a door on him. Savanake tries to get round to them, but falls through a rotten walkway. When Campion tries to help him, he shoots at Campion, losing his grip as he does so, and is washed into the waterwheel and killed.

The Army arrive and clear everything up, taking the precious deeds found in the box to the government. Hal has proof, found in Galley's house, that he is the Pontisbright heir; Randall and Mary (the oldest Fitton) plan to marry; and Amanda's wound is not serious. She and Campion talk, and she makes him promise to take her into "partnership", when she is a little older.

== Characters in "Sweet Danger" ==
- Albert Campion, a mysterious adventurer
- Magersfontein Lugg, Campion's servant, an ex-criminal
- "Guffy" Randall, an old friend of Campion
- Dicky Farquharson, a famous prospector, on Campion's team
- Jonathan Eager-Wright, a mountaineer, also working with Campion
- Amanda Fitton, a beautiful and precocious teen-aged girl, the Miller of Pontisbright
- Hal Fitton, Amanda's serious younger brother and heir to the missing title
- Mary Fitton, Amanda's sensible older sister
- Miss Harriet Huntingforest, the Fittons' kindly American aunt
- "Scatty" Williams, Amanda's assistant at the mill
- Dr Edmund Galley, the rather odd local doctor
- Brett Savanake, a secretive and powerful financier
- Mr Parrott, Savanake's right-hand man
- "Peaky" Doyle, a thug in Savanake's employ

== Adaptation ==
The story was adapted for television by the BBC, the fifth of eight Campion stories starring Peter Davison as Campion and Brian Glover as Lugg. Originally broadcast as two separate hour-long episodes, the original UK air date of the first part was 12 January 1990. The series was shown in the United States by PBS. Amanda Fitton was played by Lysette Anthony and Guffy Randall by David Haig.
