= Cargo of Eagles =

1968 novel by Margery Allingham

- First edition
- Author: Margery Allingham
- Language: English
- Series: Albert Campion
- Genre: Crime novel
- Publisher: Chatto & Windus
- Publication date: 1968
- Publication place: United Kingdom
- Media type: Print (Hardback & Paperback)
- Preceded by: The Mind Readers
- Followed by: Mr Campion's Farthing

Cargo of Eagles is a crime novel by Margery Allingham, first published in 1968, in the United Kingdom by Chatto & Windus, London. It was incomplete at her death in 1966 and completed by her husband Philip Youngman Carter. It is the nineteenth novel in the Albert Campion series.

== Plot introduction ==
Saltey in Essex, the "Back Door to London", has a long history of smuggling, and holds a secret that leads to murder. Albert Campion sends his young American associate Mortimer Kelsey to mingle with the locals to try to solve the mystery. The evidence points to a robbery from a yacht done years before by a dangerous criminal named Teague and his associates.
