= Hide My Eyes =

1958 novel by Margery Allingham

- First edition
- Author: Margery Allingham
- Language: English
- Series: Albert Campion
- Genre: Crime novel
- Publisher: Chatto & Windus
- Publication date: 1958
- Publication place: United Kingdom
- Media type: Print (Hardback & Paperback)
- Preceded by: The Beckoning Lady
- Followed by: The China Governess

Hide My Eyes is a crime novel by Margery Allingham, first published in 1958, in the United Kingdom by Chatto & Windus, London. It was published in the U.S. under the titles Tether's End or Ten Were Missing. It is the sixteenth novel in the Albert Campion series and was a runner-up for the Gold Dagger Award.

== Plot ==
An old-fashioned bus with two elderly passengers visible through its windows parks in a London street and its driver covertly enters an adjacent building with a gun to meet with a moneylender. Several months later, independent detective Albert Campion meets with Detective Charlie Luke, who has connected the missing moneylender to several murders in the same neighborhood but lacks evidence apart from a witness who saw the bus, which may have been used to move the body. The police have been unsuccessful tracing the vehicle and its two elderly passengers.

On the same day, Annabelle, a seventeen-year-old woman who travelled to London to live with a relative she has never met before, asks an old friend, Richard, to meet her so he will be aware of where she is staying, just in case. A police officer directs them to the relative's house, known as Tether's End. It's attached to a museum of oddities, and the officer is suddenly struck by a memory that may have bearing on the case of the missing moneylender and the two old people on the bus.

Wandering in the museum, Annabelle encounters an exhibit missing two life-sized wax figures and meets her aunt Polly and a man named Gerry whom Polly treats like a son, though they are not related. Richard sees Gerry leave the house and, suspicious, resolves to follow him.

Meanwhile, attorney Matthew Phillipson arrives to consult with Polly, who had caught Gerry altering a check she wrote to him and is worried he's showing signs of criminality. The lawyer has made arrangements to meet with Gerry, recover the fraudulent funds, and set him straight. Phillipson is startled when he learns that Polly had hoped she could arrange for Gerry to marry her niece, though she admits it won't work after all because the girl is too young.

Richard catches up with Gerry, who insists that they stay together while visiting several drinking establishments. Soon Richard realizes Gerry is a dangerous, charismatic liar.

Charlie Luke and Campion meet with the police officer who tells them that there were two wax figures in the museum of oddities that fit the description of the old couple on the bus. Luke is discouraged because he believes the witness who reported seeing two people on the bus mistakenly recalled and described the waxwork figures. They visit Polly to ask about the waxwork figures. As they leave, Campion asks about shop nearby that sells the kind of gloves left at the scene of another murder, startling Polly. As they depart, they get word that the bus has been found, hidden at a scrapyard.

Gerry tells Richard, meanwhile, that he has to go to a pay phone to make a call. While out of sight, he quickly alters his clothing and picks up a large box to pose as a delivery man. He enters the building housing the office of lawyer Phillipson, drops the box noisily in front of the doorman, then enters the office and shoots the lawyer dead, the gunshot mistaken by those in the building for the sound of the box falling again. He escapes without the murder being discovered.

Realizing he has been set up to provide Gerry with an alibi, Richard calls Annabelle who tells him, amused, that she thinks Polly had hoped to arrange a marriage with her for Gerry. Alarmed, he asks her to get Polly to invite him to Tether's End as soon as possible. He then asks a policeman for directions to Rolf's Dump, an address he noticed on a label attached to an object in Gerry's car.

Gerry, meanwhile, is startled when he looks at a wallet he took from the murdered lawyer and discovers it contains letters from Polly that reveal she knows he stole from her. He realizes she will see through his alibis once the murder is discovered.

A night watchman at the dump directs Richard to the shed where Gerry works on cars. Inside he's startled by two old people sitting in the dark, just as Campion and Luke arrive. They turn out to be the missing waxworks. Richard tries to keep Annabelle and Polly out of his account to spare them, but after the police let him go, he tries to call the house and finds out the line has been cut.

Polly and Annabelle go to a movie and have dinner at a restaurant, where she calls her lawyer's number and learns he has been murdered. As they return home, she tells Annabelle she must return home first thing in the morning, to her niece's dismay. Once in the house, they encounter Gerry.

While the police gather evidence of several murders from the dump site, Richard goes to Tether's End and Polly secretly arranges for him to help Annabelle escape down a fire escape. They're unable to climb over a wall to leave the property, so take shelter in the museum. Gerry learns Polly knows he killed the lawyer. He drugs her, planning his escape, and she warns him he will have nothing left if he kills her.

As the police surround the house, Gerry goes into the museum, planning to burn his coat, which has traces of blood on it, but finds Annabelle and Richard who have been hiding there. Richard attacks Gerry and takes his gun from him. The museum catches fire and is quickly engulfed. After considering suicide, Gerry decides to rescue Polly.

Though the police have enough evidence to see Gerry hanged for his crimes, Luke tells a colleague Polly will forgive him because her love for him is "like nuclear energy. It's absolute."

== Reception ==
Referring to its American title, Tether's End, crime fiction critic Anthony Boucher called the novel "a delight" and a sign that Allingham had "mastered her new approach to the crime novel."

Biographer Julia Jones reports that the critical reception of Hide My Eyes and subsequent novels was mixed compared to the author's earlier output. Yet it was financially successful, in part because it was her first novel to be chosen by Reader's Digest Condensed Books.

== Interpretations ==
According to Jones a theme of the novel is uncritical love leading to evil, writing, "[t]he anguish of the book is the anguish of a parent who has seen a child go wrong and can trace it directly to loving indulgence... [Polly] is a fool and worse, for she deliberately shuts her eyes to the clues scattered in her path and does all within her power not to recognize the monster of callous selfishness and duplicity that her love has created." As for Gerry, the novel's villain, his character was "the nearest Margery came to the portrait of an actual criminal" with some aspects of his crimes similar to crimes reported widely in the news.
