= The Beckoning Lady =

1955 novel by Margery Allingham

- First edition
- Author: Margery Allingham
- Language: English
- Series: Albert Campion
- Genre: Crime novel
- Publisher: Chatto & Windus
- Publication date: 1955
- Publication place: United Kingdom
- Media type: Print (Hardback & Paperback)
- Preceded by: The Tiger in the Smoke
- Followed by: Hide My Eyes

The Beckoning Lady is a crime novel by Margery Allingham, first published in 1955 in the United Kingdom by Chatto & Windus, London, and later published in the United States by Doubleday, New York under the title The Estate of the Beckoning Lady in 1975. It is the 15th novel in the Albert Campion series.

== Plot introduction ==
While Campion is attending the preparations for a summer party held by Minnie and Tonker Cassand, the body of Cassand's uncle is discovered. Suspecting murder, Campion works to uncover the perpetrator and motive.
