= The China Governess =

1963 crime novel by Margery Allingham

- First edition
- Author: Margery Allingham
- Cover artist: Youngman Carter
- Language: English
- Series: Albert Campion
- Genre: Crime novel
- Publisher: Chatto & Windus
- Publication date: 1963
- Publication place: United Kingdom
- Media type: Print (Hardback & Paperback)
- Preceded by: Hide My Eyes
- Followed by: The Mind Readers

The China Governess is a crime novel by Margery Allingham, first published in 1963, in the United Kingdom by Chatto & Windus, London. It is the seventeenth novel in the Albert Campion series.

== Plot introduction ==
Timothy Kinnit is trying to elope with Julia, but the question of his origins as a wartime refugee baby stand between them and their future. What does the "Turk Street Mile", once the wickedest street in London but now redeveloped after wartime bombing, have to do with the mystery? Can Albert Campion and the recently widowed Superintendent Charles Luke find the answer and discover who wants it kept a secret?
