= Albert Campion =

Fictional character in novels by Margery Allingham

- Albert Campion mysteries character
- First appearance: The Crime at Black Dudley
- Created by: Margery Allingham
- Portrayed by: Bernard Horsfall; Brian Smith; Peter Davison; James Snell; Richard Hurndall; William Fox; Basil Moss

In-universe information
- Aliases: Rudolph (real name) the Honourable Tootles Ash, Mornington Dodd, Orlando, Christopher Twelvetrees
- Gender: Male
- Occupation: Adventurer, detective
- Family: Emily (grandmother); Herbert (brother); Valentine Ferris (sister)
- Spouse: Lady Amanda Fitton
- Children: Rupert (son)
- Nationality: British

Albert Campion is a fictional character in a series of detective novels and short stories by Margery Allingham. He first appeared as a supporting character in The Crime at Black Dudley (1929), an adventure story involving a ring of criminals, and would go on to feature in another 18 novels and over 20 short stories.

Supposedly created as a parody of Dorothy L. Sayers' detective Lord Peter Wimsey, Campion established his own identity, and matured and developed as the series progressed. After Allingham's death her husband Philip Youngman Carter completed her last Campion book and wrote two more before his own death. In 2012, the British crime novelist Mike Ripley completed an unfinished manuscript of Carter's which became Mr. Campion's Farewell. Ripley has written 11 further Campion novels as of 2024.

== Fictional biography ==
Albert Campion is a pseudonym used by a man who was born in 1900 into a prominent British aristocratic family. Early novels hint that he was part of the Royal Family but this suggestion is dropped in later works. However, it is hinted at again in Cargo of Eagles, Allingham's last novel. He was educated at Rugby School and the (fictitious) St. Ignatius' College, Cambridge (according to a mini-biography included in Sweet Danger; this is also hinted at in Police at the Funeral). Ingenious, resourceful and well-educated, in his twenties he assumed the name Campion and began a life as an adventurer and detective.

== Characteristics ==
Campion is thin, blond, wears horn-rimmed glasses, and is often described as affable, inoffensive and bland, with a deceptively blank and unintelligent expression. He sometimes engages in silly stunts, slapstick humour, and carries a realistic-looking water pistol instead of a firearm. He is nonetheless a man of authority and action, and considers himself to be a helpful and comforting 'Uncle Albert' to friends and those in need. In some stories, he lives in a flat above a police station at Number 17A, Bottle Street, in Piccadilly, London. In the early stories he has a pet jackdaw called Autolycus.

In some stories, Allingham explores the differences between society as it existed before the Great War, and the modern world. Campion sometimes works as an intermediary between old upper-class characters and the new, modern police.

== Names ==
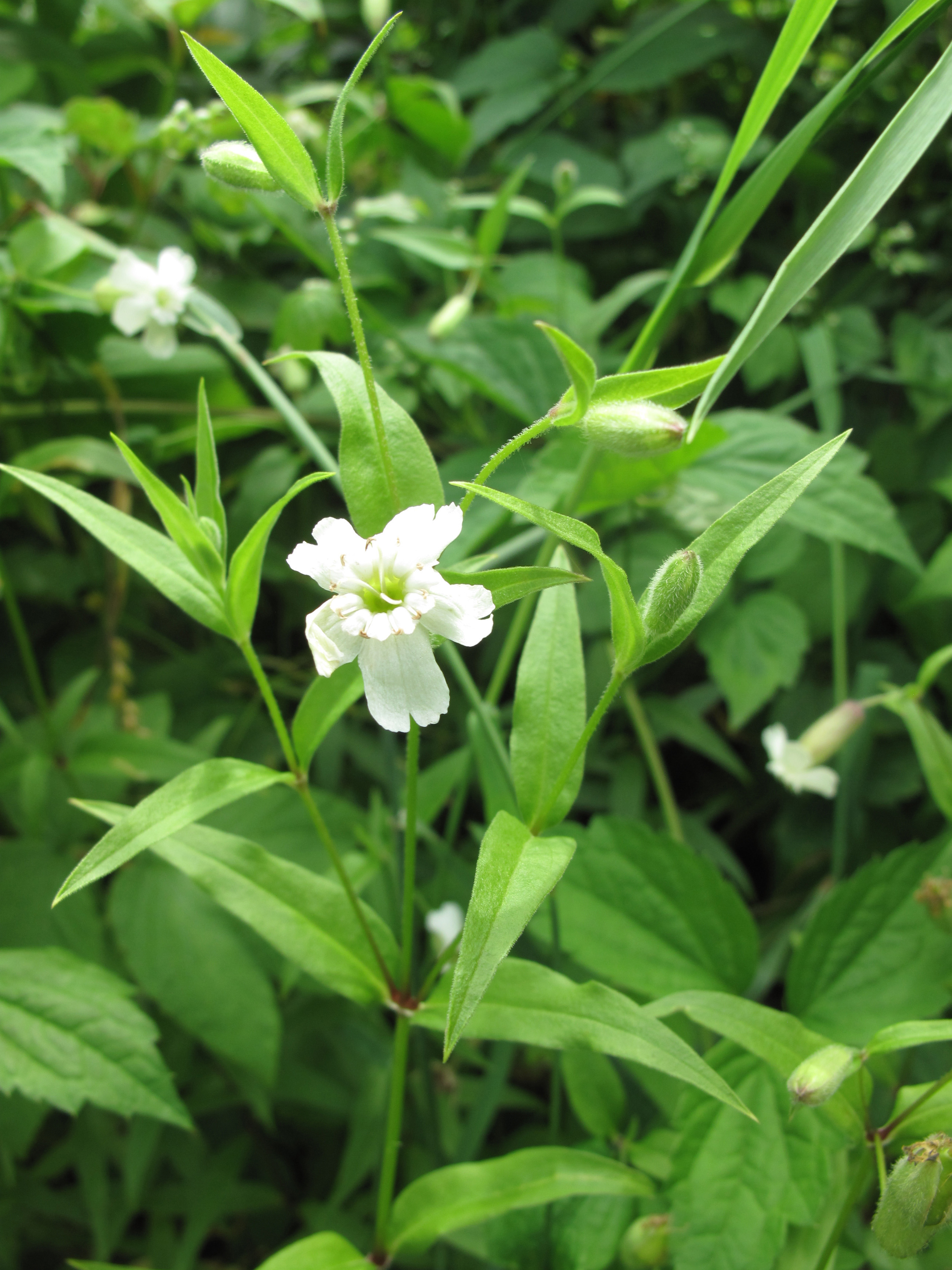
White campion, a wildflower

The name 'Campion' may have its origin in the Old French word for 'champion'. Another source says the name was suggested by Allingham's husband, Philip Youngman Carter, and may allude to the Jesuit martyr St. Edmund Campion. Carter and St. Edmund Campion were both former pupils of Christ's Hospital school. Campion's fictional college, St. Ignatius, supports the Edmund Campion connection, since St. Ignatius of Loyola was the founder of the Jesuits. There are also occasional references in the books to the field-flower campion (e.g., Look to the Lady ch. 21), evoking the similar relationship between the fictional hero the Scarlet Pimpernel and the pimpernel flower.

'Albert Campion' is revealed early on to be a pseudonym. In Mystery Mile and Police at the Funeral, his true first name is said to be Rudolph, while his surname begins with a K. In The Fashion in Shrouds he also mentions his first name being Rudolph but confides he changed it, asking people to call him Albert as he did not like the name Rudolph. In Look to the Lady the butler reveals to Lugg that he has deduced who Campion is by a particular feature of his pyjamas which he has also seen on Campion's elder brother's pyjamas.

Campion has used many other names in the course of his career. 'Mornington Dodd' and 'the Honourable Tootles Ash' are mentioned in The Crime at Black Dudley; 'Christopher Twelvetrees' and 'Orlando' are mentioned in Look to the Lady.

== Family and background ==
Allingham makes various references to Campion's aristocratic background, and hints at a connection to royalty in several asides. However, none of the books reveal his full birth name or identify more than an isolated individual or two in his family of origin. A study of the books suggests his father was a viscount and was already dead at the start of the series. Campion's mother is mentioned several times and writes a letter in The Fashion in Shrouds, and Campion borrows a car from his older brother (apparently the current holder of the title) in Mystery Mile, but neither of them appears in person. In Sweet Danger, it was mentioned that his brother was 'still unmarried' and therefore Campion is likely to 'come into the title some day.' In Coroner's Pidgin a character mentions Campion's uncle, a bishop, and says, 'Let me see, you're the only nephew now, aren't you?' This indicates that, by the middle of the Second World War, Campion's older brother Herbert has died and Campion has inherited the title.

In More Work for the Undertaker, set just after the war, Lugg addresses Campion sarcastically as 'young Viscount Clever'. Campion's sister Valentine Ferris plays a central part in The Fashion in Shrouds; in that book, it is revealed that they are both estranged from most of their family. In Police at the Funeral, the venerable Caroline Faraday is aware of his true identity, and knows his grandmother Emily (whom she refers to as 'the Dowager') – she calls him by his real name, 'Rudolph', and states at one point that the rest of his family blame Emily for encouraging Campion in his adventurous ways.

In Safe as Houses he has a second cousin called Monmouth who has a mother called Lady Charlotte Lawn whom he refers to as his great-aunt.

== Associates ==
From Mystery Mile onwards, Campion is normally aided by his manservant, Magersfontein Lugg, an uncouth, rough-and-tumble fellow who used to be a burglar. Campion is good friends with Inspector (later Superintendent) Stanislaus Oates of Scotland Yard, who is as by-the-book as Campion is unorthodox, and in later books with Oates's protégé Inspector Charles Luke.

In wartime, Campion is involved in intelligence work, and after the war he continues to have an unspecified connection to the secret services.

Campion also has many friends and allies, seemingly scattered all across London and the English countryside, often including professional criminals. In the short story "The Meaning of the Act" Campion explains to Oates that the secret of his success is to 'take a drink with anyone, and pick your pals where you find 'em'.

In Mystery Mile Campion is subtly shown to be in love with Biddy Paget, around whose home most of the story revolves; Campion is distraught when, at the end of the adventure, she marries an American, and his sadness at losing her is mentioned again in subsequent stories.

After a doomed passion for a married woman in Dancers in Mourning, Campion eventually marries Amanda Fitton, who first appears in Sweet Danger as a 17-year-old and later becomes an aircraft engineer; they have a son, named Rupert. Her brother Hal recovers the family title of Earl of Pontisbright as a result of the adventures described in Sweet Danger, and Amanda then becomes Lady Amanda, as the sister of an Earl.

== Mr Campion's Farewell ==
Crime writer Mike Ripley completed an unfinished Campion manuscript, started by Philip Youngman Carter before his death. The fragment, which contained revisions and minor corrections but no plot outline, character synopsis or plan, was bequeathed to Margery Allingham's sister Joyce; upon her death in 2001, the manuscript was left to officials of the Margery Allingham Society. Beginning in 2012, Ripley, with the approval and agreement of the Margery Allingham Society, completed Youngman Carter's manuscript, which has become Mr Campion's Farewell. The novel was published in March 2014 by Severn House Publishers. Succeeding volumes were entirely Ripley's work.

== Bibliography ==
The Campion stories are generally adventures rather than true mysteries, as they rarely feature puzzles that the reader has a chance of solving; it is the characters and situations which carry the story. Most of the novels are short by modern standards – about 200 pages long.

=== Novels ===
- The Crime at Black Dudley (1929) (U.S. title: The Black Dudley Murder)
  - During a party game at a remote manor house named the Black Dudley, a man is stabbed to death, and some important documents have disappeared. Introduces Campion a little later in the story, as a pleasant hanger-on with a possibly shady side; the main character is a pathologist.
- Mystery Mile (1930)
  - A retired American judge believes he has the key to identifying the real identity of a criminal mastermind. Campion, after saving his life, is hired to protect him and his children. Most of the book takes place at a country house on an island called Mystery Mile.
- Look to the Lady (1931) (U.S. title: The Gyrth Chalice Mystery)
  - A shadowy club of art collectors intends to steal an ancient and sacred chalice from a family whose home, title, and livelihood depends upon keeping it in safely in its tower. This book opens with an attempt to locate the estranged and recently homeless heir to the family.
- Police at the Funeral (1931)
  - Set in Cambridge (where Allingham attended boarding school as a teenager), in the house of Caroline Faraday, a formidable widow whose adult children are still under her sway. Campion investigates the disappearance of Andrew, Caroline's malicious and eccentric younger son. Stanislaus Oates joins in the endeavour after Andrew is found dead in suspicious circumstances, and further attacks on the family follow. This book marks Allingham's transition from thrillers to mystery novels.
- Sweet Danger (1933) (U.S. title: Kingdom of Death or The Fear Sign)
  - In which Campion meets Amanda Fitton, his future wife. The Principality of Averna, a Balkan microstate unpopulated since the Crusades, gains international interest after an earthquake gives it access to the sea and exposes an oil supply. Campion seeks long-lost documents which will validate the Fitton family's ancestral claim to Averna, and hence place the territory in British hands.
- Death of a Ghost (1934)
  - The will of a famous painter set aside a dozen secret pictures to be unveiled, one per year, beginning 10 years after his death. The arrangement was meant to perpetuate his colourful legacy and provide more income to his widow. However, at the unveiling of the eighth painting, someone is murdered.
- Flowers for the Judge (1936) (U.S. title: Legacy in Blood)
  - Scandal strikes Barnabus Publishing, a stodgy family business, when one of its senior members dies of carbon monoxide poisoning in a sealed strongroom. Junior partner Mike Wedgwood is accused of having engineered the death, and his friend Albert Campion works to exonerate him as the trial date draws nearer. Campion's investigation links the murder with the prior notorious incident in Barnabus's history, the disappearance of another family member 20 years before.
- The Case of the Late Pig (1937)
  - In January, Campion attends a funeral for "Pig" Peters, who bullied him at school; in June, he is confronted with Pig's corpse, freshly killed.
- Dancers in Mourning (1937) (U.S. title: Who Killed Chloe?)
  - Campion is brought in to investigate a series of threatening pranks involving a group of actors and finds himself falling in love with a married woman.
- The Fashion in Shrouds (1938)
  - This book has elements of a thriller, a detective story, and a psychological novel. Fake engagements, secret weddings, jealous spouses, and broken hearts appear in this book, which introduces Campion's sister as a fashion designer.
- Traitor's Purse (1941) (U.S. title: The Sabotage Murder Mystery)
  - This war-time story opens with Campion experiencing amnesia and an associated change of personality, and closes with his recovery and marriage. After being bludgeoned midway through an espionage case, Campion is unable to remember a piece of important information or to find Stanislaus Oates, the only person in Scotland Yard who shares the secret.
- Coroner's Pidgin (1945) (U.S. title: Pearls Before Swine)
  - Campion is on his way home from the war for the first time in three years, and his attempt to catch a train out of London is delayed by the discovery of a dead body put in his bed while he takes a bath. Ultimately, he is unable to leave town until after he solves a series of art thefts.
- More Work for the Undertaker (1948)
- The Tiger in the Smoke (1952)
  - Called the finest of the Campion mysteries and her best book. The smoke in the title is a pea soup fog; the tiger is Jack Havoc, a murderous criminal on a treasure hunt.
- The Beckoning Lady (1955) (U.S. title: The Estate of the Beckoning Lady)
  - Part of the plot centers on paying taxes, which she had been struggling with at the time.
- Hide My Eyes (1958) (U.S. title: Tether's End or Ten Were Missing)
- The China Governess (1962)
- The Mind Readers (1965)
- Cargo of Eagles (1968) (completed posthumously by Philip Youngman Carter)
- Mr. Campion's Farthing (1969) (by Philip Youngman Carter)
- Mr. Campion's Falcon (1970) (U.S. title: Mr. Campion's Quarry) (by Philip Youngman Carter)
- Mr Campion's Farewell (2014) – completed by Mike Ripley
- Mr Campion's Fox (2015) by Mike Ripley
- Mr Campion's Fault (2016), Ripley
- Mr Campion's Abdication (2017), Ripley
- Mr Campion's War (2018), Ripley
- Mr Campion's Visit (2019), Ripley
- Mr Campion's Seance (2020), Ripley
- Mr Campion's Coven (2021), Ripley
- Mr Campion's Mosaic (2022), Ripley
- Mr Campion's Memory (2023), Ripley

=== Short story collections ===
- Mr. Campion: Criminologist (1937) comprising:
  - The Case of the Late Pig
  - The Case of the White Elephant
  - The Case of the Man with the Sack
  - The Border-Line Case
  - The Case of the Widow
  - The Case of the Pro and the Con
  - The Case of the Old Man in the Window
- Mr. Campion and Others (1939, 1950)
  - The Widow
  - The Name on the Wrapper
  - The Hat Trick
  - The Question Mark
  - The Old Man in the Window
  - The White Elephant
  - The Frenchman's Gloves
  - The Longer View
  - Safe as Houses
  - The Definite Article
  - The Meaning of the Act
  - A Matter of Form
  - The Danger Point
- The Casebook of Mr. Campion (1947) comprising:
  - The Case of the Question Mark
  - The Crimson Letters
  - The Definite Article
  - The Magic Hat
  - A Matter of Form
  - The Meaning of the Act
  - Safe as Houses
- The Allingham Case-Book (1969) comprising:
  - Tall Story
  - Three is a Lucky Number
  - The Villa Maria Celeste
  - The Psychologist
  - Little Miss Know-All
  - One Morning They'll Hang Him
  - The Lieabout
  - Face Value
  - Evidence in Camera
  - Joke Over
  - The Lying-In-State
  - The Pro and the Con
  - Is There a Doctor in the House?
  - The Borderline Case
  - They Never Get Caught
  - The Mind's Eye Mystery
  - Mum Knows Best
  - The Snapdragon and the C.I.D.
- The Allingham Minibus (U.S. title: Mr. Campion's Lucky Day and Other Stories) (1973)
  - He Was Asking After You
  - Publicity
  - The Perfect Butler
  - The Barbarian
  - Mr Campion's Lucky Day
  - 'Tis Not Hereafter
  - The Correspondents
  - He Preferred Them Sad
  - The Unseen Door
  - Bird Thou Never Wert
  - The Same to Us
  - She Heard It on the Radio
  - The Man With The Sack
  - The Secret
  - A Quarter of a Million
  - The Pioneers
  - The Sexton's Wife
  - The Wink
- The Return of Mr. Campion (1989) comprising:
  - The Case Is Altered
  - My Friend Mr Campion
  - The Dog Day
  - The Wind Glass
  - The Beauty King
  - The Black Tent
  - Sweet and Low
  - Once in a Lifetime
  - The Kernel of Truth
  - Happy Christmas
  - The Wisdom of Esdras
  - The Curious Affair in Nut Row
  - What to do with an Aging Detective

=== Omnibus editions ===
- Crime and Mr Campion (1959) – Death of a Ghost, Flowers for the Judge and Dancers in Mourning.
- Three Cases for Mr Campion (1961) – Look to the Lady, The Fashion in Shrouds and Traitor's Purse.
- The Mysterious Mr Campion (1963) – The Case of the Late Pig, Dancers in Mourning and The Tiger in the Smoke;
  also a short story On Christmas Day in the Morning and a preface by the author.
- Mr Campion's Lady (1965) – Sweet Danger, The Fashion in Shrouds and Traitor's Purse;
  also a short story A Word in Season and a preface by the author.
- Mr Campion's Clowns (1967) – Mystery Mile, Coroner's Pidgin and More Work for the Undertaker;
  with a preface by Philip Youngman Carter.

== Adaptations ==
=== Campion (1959–1960) ===
Two stories were adapted by the BBC in 1959 and 1960, with Bernard Horsfall as Campion and Wally Patch as Lugg. Each story was shown in six 30-minute episodes. The 1959 adaptation of Dancers in Mourning also featured John Ruddock as Oates, Denis Quilley as Jimmy Sutane, Michael Gough as Squire Mercer and Noel Howlett as 'Uncle' William Faraday. The 1960 adaptation, Death of a Ghost, featured Arthur Brough as Oates.

=== Detective (1968) ===
In 1968 The Case of the Late Pig was adapted for television starring Brian Smith as Campion, and George Sewell as Lugg. It was part of the BBC Detective (1964–1969) series which was an anthology series featuring adaptations of detective stories.

=== Campion (1989–1990) ===
In 1989 and 1990, the first eight of the novels (excluding The Crime at Black Dudley) were adapted over two seasons, with each story shown in two hour-long episodes. Peter Davison played Campion, Brian Glover was Lugg and Andrew Burt was Oates.

=== Radio ===
Various stories have been adapted for BBC Radio over the years. Campion was played by James Snell, Richard Hurndall, William Fox, and Basil Moss.
Among them were the following.
"Traitor's Purse" (read by Roger Allam in 10 episodes),
"Look to the Lady" (1961) starred Richard Hurndall.
"Mr Campion's Falcon" (1972) by Youngman Carter. not by Allingham: William Fox took the lead role.
"More Work for the Undertaker" (1986) starred Francis Matthews
