= Magersfontein Lugg =

- Albert Campion mysteries character
- First appearance: Mystery Mile
- Created by: Margery Allingham
- Portrayed by: Wally Patch; George Sewell; Brian Glover; Cyril Shaps; Brewster Mason

In-universe information
- Gender: Male
- Occupation: Manservant, Burglar, Detective
- Nationality: British

Magersfontein Lugg is a fictional character in the Albert Campion detective novels, written by Margery Allingham. Servant and factotum to Mr Campion, Lugg is a former burglar, with a gruff manner, who hinders Campion socially as much as he helps him with detection.

== Appearances ==
Lugg first appears in Mystery Mile, where his contacts in the underworld prove useful; he goes on to be featured in most of the Campion books.

Lugg also features in novels by John Lawton, most notably Black Out (see review on Amazon.com).

== Character ==
Lugg is a large, bald man, a former criminal who reformed after he "lost his figure". In Police at the Funeral, he has recently grown a very large white moustache, which he also sports in Sweet Danger.

Lugg, in The Fashion in Shrouds, is the originator of the sentence "It's crackers to slip a rozzer the dropsy in snide". This sentence frequently appeared in Mad magazine and has achieved some notoriety as an Internet meme, though it is seldom attributed to either Lugg or Allingham. The sentence contains English slang and means, "It's madness (crackers) to slip a policeman (rozzer) a packet of money (the dropsy) in worthless money (snide)" or "it's madness to try to bribe a policeman with counterfeit money".

Explaining why Lugg never seemed to age over the series of books, Allingham herself suggested that, like the detective's hornrimmed glasses, Lugg was “part of Mr Campion's personal accoutrements...Lugg is his sense of humour, and is disliked by some of his best friends” as a result. The pair have also been seen as a classic comic act, the one hypermanic, the other the lugubrious foil for Campion's wit. P. D. James considered the character too close to the traditional stage cockney for full effect.

Lugg's character is more subtle and nuanced. Campion displays the indifference to social standing which betokens those who have been born to it; like the legendary "true aristocrat" which it is constantly hinted that he is, he associates freely and without embarrassment with all classes of people. Lugg, in order to prick this cosmopolitan insouciance, affects—when it suits him—a comic aspiration to "better himself" and to lift both himself and Campion "out of the gutter," an aspiration frustrated by Campion's insistence on mixing himself up with crime. In this way he often succeeds in shaming, or at least embarrassing, Campion, and thus the status dynamic between the two men is made far more interesting and attractive than the traditional master-servant relationship as typified by Lord Peter Wimsey and his man Bunter.

Lugg's first name has been linked to the British defeat in the Battle of Magersfontein during the Boer War.

== Portrayals ==
=== Television ===
In the 1959 TV series Lugg was played by Wally Patch.

George Sewell portrayed the character in a 1968 adaptation of The Case of the Late Pig for the BBC anthology series Detective.

In the 1989 series, Lugg was played by ex-wrestler turned character actor Brian Glover.

=== Radio ===
Many of the Campion novels have been adapted for BBC Radio over the years. Lugg has been played by Cyril Shaps and Brewster Mason.

== See also ==
- Dromio
- Sancho Panza
