= Brian Glover =

British character actor, writer and professional wrestler (1934–1997)

- Glover in the film Alien 3
- Born: 2 April 1934; Sheffield, South Yorkshire, England
- Died: 24 July 1997 (aged 63); London, England
- Resting place: Brompton Cemetery, London, England
- Education: University of Sheffield
- Occupations: Wrestler; teacher; actor; writer
- Years active: 1969–1997
- Spouses: Elaine Foster (m. 1954, divorced) Tara Prem (m. 1976)
- Children: 2

Brian Glover (2 April 1934 – 24 July 1997) was an English actor and writer. He worked as a teacher and professional wrestler before commencing an acting career which included films, many roles on British television and work on the stage. His film appearances include Kes (1969), An American Werewolf in London (1981) and Alien 3 (1992).

Described by The New York Times as a "robust character actor" who played "gruff but likable roles", he had a "string of roles playing tough guys and criminals". He once said, "You play to your strengths in this game, and my strength is as a bald-headed, rough-looking Yorkshireman". Glover was also known as the voice of Gaffer in the Tetley tea commercials. The Independent described him upon his death as "one of Britain's best-loved actors".

== Early life and wrestling career ==
Glover was born at the Women's Hospital, Sheffield, South Yorkshire and he lived in Sheffield until 1937 when his parents moved to Lundwood, near Barnsley. His father, Charles Glover, was a wrestler, performing as "the Red Devil". He attended Barnsley Grammar School and the University of Sheffield, where he supplemented his student grant with appearances as a professional wrestler, going under the ring name "Leon Arras the Man From Paris". He adopted that name from a wrestler who did not turn up to a match one night, for whom Glover stood in. His wrestling style incorporated a lot of comedy, including the catchphrases "ask 'im, ref" and "'ow about that then".

In 1954 he married his first wife, Elaine Foster, and became a teacher at the Barnsley school where he had been a pupil. He taught English and French from 1954 until 1970, some of it at Longcar Central School, Barnsley, where he met Barry Hines, who was also teaching there. He managed to combine this with regular performances as "Leon Arras", whose appearances included bouts on World of Sport, and in Paris, Milan, Zürich and Barcelona.

== Acting career ==
Glover's first acting role came playing Mr Sugden, the comically overbearing sports teacher in Ken Loach's film Kes (a job offered to him when Barry Hines, who wrote the film, suggested him to the director). Although untrained, Glover proved to be a skilled and flexible character actor, using techniques learnt during his wrestling career. His large bald head, stocky build, and distinctive voice, with his Yorkshire accent, garnered him many roles as tough guys and criminals.

He played Bottom in A Midsummer Night's Dream (BBC TV, 1981) and had a recurring role in the classic sitcom Porridge as dim-witted prison inmate Cyril Heslop who, when accused of being illiterate, utters the memorable line "I read a book once! Green, it was." He played Quilp in The Old Curiosity Shop, and lent his voice to a number of animated characters, including the "gaffer" of the "Tetley Tea Folk" in a long-running series of television advertisements for Tetley tea, the voice behind the advertising slogan "Bread wi' nowt taken out" for Allinson bread, and the voice of "Big Pig", the mascot for the long-running Now That's What I Call Music! album series, appearing on the TV adverts for Now 3, Now 4 and Now 5. He also appeared in An American Werewolf in London, The First Great Train Robbery, Jabberwocky, Alien 3, Leon the Pig Farmer and as General Douglas in a Bollywood hit 1942: A Love Story. He appeared seven times in Play for Today, in three of them as part of a recurring trio of Yorkshiremen: The Fishing Party, Shakespeare or Bust and Three for the Fancy.

Glover's performance in Kes led to parts at the Royal Court Theatre, London, notably in Lindsay Anderson's The Changing Room (1971). A season with Britain's Royal Shakespeare Company followed, where his roles included Charles the wrestler (and, drawing on his wrestling experience, the fight arranger) in As You Like It, and a robust Peter in Romeo and Juliet. For the Royal National Theatre he appeared in The Mysteries (as God, creating the world with the help of a real fork-lift truck), Saint Joan and Don Quixote.

In the film Brannigan he claimed to have lost the only fight in his acting career, fighting John Wayne.

His performance in The Mysteries secured additional work in the commercial theatre. The Canterbury Tales ("Chaucer wi' nowt taken owt")(West End) was followed by a return to television and the Play for Today series, both as writer and performer and, in turn, more screen roles. Glover wrote a horror themed episode of Theatre Box called Death Angel, which aired in 1981. He went on to play Lugg, the endearing rogue manservant to Albert Campion in the series Campion, and the role of a crook, Griffiths, in the Doctor Who story Attack of the Cybermen in 1985. He played Edouard Dindon in the original London cast of La Cage aux Folles.

In 1991 he guest starred in the second episode of Bottom, in the episode "Gas", as the hostile neighbour Mr Rottweiler. At the end of his life he acted in John Godber's rugby league comedy Up 'n' Under (1998). He was also the voice for the UNO Upholstery TV adverts in 1995 and 1996.

Glover also wrote over twenty plays and short films. In 1982 he was a guest presenter in series six of Friday Night Saturday Morning, a late-night BBC chat show.

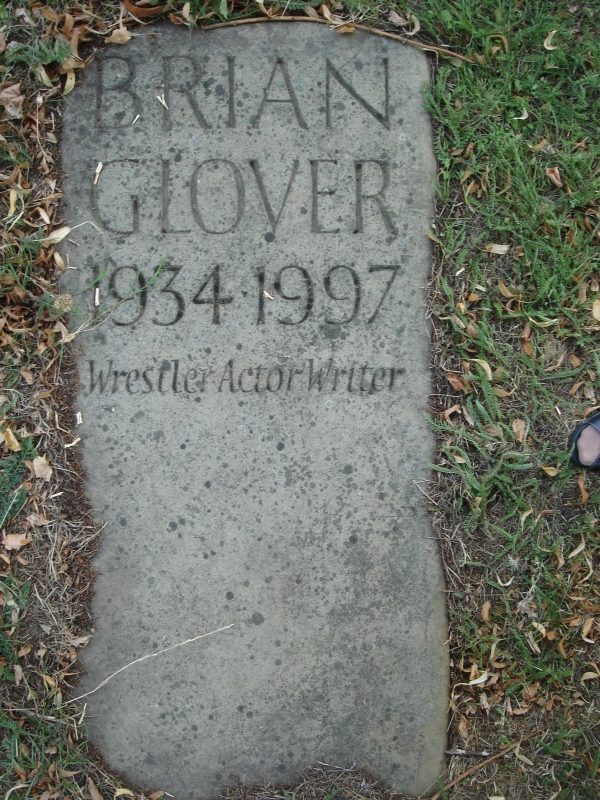
Gravestone

== Personal life and death ==
Glover was married twice, secondly to television producer Tara Prem, the daughter of TV actor Bakhshi Prem, on 2 October 1976. He had two children, one daughter from his first marriage and one son from his second marriage. In September 1996, Glover was diagnosed with a brain tumour and underwent an operation for it. The tumour was removed and it appeared he had made a full recovery but it returned in the summer of 1997 and Glover died in his sleep in a London hospital on 24 July 1997. He was buried in Brompton Cemetery, London, on 30 July 1997.

== Film ==
Year	Title	Role	Notes
1969	Kes	Mr. Sugden	
1972	Joy	Extra	
1973	O Lucky Man!	Plantation Foreman/Bassett	
1975	Brannigan	Jimmy-the-Bet	
1975	Mister Quilp	Furnaceman	
1976	Trial by Combat	Sidney Gore	
1977	Sweeney!	Mac	
1977	Joseph Andrews	Gaoler	
1977	Jabberwocky	Armourer	
1978	The First Great Train Robbery	Captain Jimmy	
1978	Absolution	First Policeman	
1981	An American Werewolf in London	Chess Player	
1982	Britannia Hospital	Painter	
1984	Ordeal by Innocence	Executioner	
1984	The Company of Wolves	Amourous Boy's Father	
1988	To Kill a Priest	Judge	
1991	Kafka	Castl Henchman	
1992	Alien 3	Andrews	
1992	Leon the Pig Farmer	Brian Chadwick	
1994	Prince of Jutland	Caedman	
1994	1942: A Love Story	General Douglas	
1997	Snow White: A Tale of Terror	Lars	
1997	Stiff Upper Lips	Eric	
1998	Up 'n' Under	Jack	posthumously released

== Television ==
Year	Title	Role	Notes
1971	On the House	Bagley	Episode: "Will the Real Harvey Micklethwaite Please Stand Up?"
1971	Paul Temple	Waites	Episode: "Party Piece"
1971–1974	Play for Today	Art/Mr. Warboys	5 episodes
1972	Coronation Street	Fred Henshaw	2 episodes
1972	Sez Les	Various	2 episodes
1973	Thirty-Minute Theatre	The Guard	Episode: "Playthings"
1973	Whatever Happened to the Likely Lads?	Flint	Episode: "No Hiding Place"
1973	The Regiment	Sgt. Dyke	Episode: "Courtship"
1973	The Protectors	Allen	Episode: "Quin"
1974	Porridge	Heslop	3 episodes
1975	The Sweeney	Moose	Episode: "Thin Ice"
1975	Not On Your Nellie	Battling Bill	Episode: "Requiem for a Heavyweight"
1975	Dixon of Dock Green	Chuck Windell	Episode: "Baubles, Bangles and Beads"
1975	Quiller	Sergeant	Episode: "Any Last Requests"
1977	Secret Army	Corporal Emil Schnorr	Episode: "Growing Up"
1978	The Famous Five	Tiger Dan	Episode: "Five Go Off in a Caravan"
1978	Target	Labour Party Agent	Episode: "Queen's Pardon"
1978	Return of the Saint	Sam Plackett	Episode: "Signal Stop"
1980	Sounding Brass	Horace Gilbert Bestwick	Miniseries: 6 episodes
1980	Minder	Yorkie	Episode: "The Beer Hunter"
1981	BBC Television Shakespeare	Nick Bottom	Episode: A Midsummer Night's Dream
1983	Red Monarch	Nikita Khruschev	TV film
1984–1985	Bottle Boys		
1985	Doctor Who	Charles Griffiths	Serial: "Attack of the Cybermen"
1985	Last of the Summer Wine	Oogie Buttercluff	Episode: "Keeping Britain Tidy"
1986	Lost Empires	Tommy Beamish	Miniseries: 4 episodes
1989	All Creatures Great and Small	Mr. Dawson	Episode: "Here and There"
1989–1990	Campion	Magersfontein Lugg	16 episodes
1991	Bottom	Mr. Rottweiler	Episode: "Gas"
1992	Press Gang	Dr. Threeways	Episode: "UnXpected"
1993	The Bill	Ken Farley	Episode: "Broken"
1994	Anna Lee	Selwyn Price	Miniseries: 5 episodes
