= The Pastor's Wife =

The Pastor's Wife may refer to:

- The Pastor's Wife (book), a true crime book by Diane Fanning
- The Pastor's Wife (film), a 2011 biographical television film based on the book
