= The Pastor's Wife (film) =

2011 American television film

- Written by: Robert L. Freedman and Diane Fanning
- Directed by: Norma Bailey
- Starring: Rose McGowan
- Countries of origin: United States; Canada
- Original language: English

Production
- Producers: Jonas Goodman; Harvey Kahn
- Running time: 87 minutes

Original release
- Network: Lifetime
- Release: 2011

The Pastor's Wife is a 2011 biographical television film, starring Rose McGowan as Mary Winkler and based on the true-crime book of the same title by author Diane Fanning. It premiered on November 5, 2011, on the Lifetime Network.

== Plot ==
Mary Winkler is a housewife and mother of three daughters, who is married to Matthew Winkler, a pastor admired by many in his community for his friendliness and his views about family values. To many in town, the Winklers are seen as a perfect family with Matthew as a perfect husband and wonderful father and Mary as a dutiful wife and mother. Early one morning at the Winkler's home, however, a shotgun blast is heard by the Winkler children. Mary takes the children away in the car on a sudden trip, with the children wondering what happened to their father. Concerned neighbors investigate the Winkler home that night, finding Matthew dead in a bedroom with a shotgun wound. Fearing the Winkler family has been kidnapped, the local and state authorities and FBI issues an Amber alert for the Winklers. Eventually, a patrol car finds Mary and her children, but they also find a shotgun in her car and apprehend Mrs. Winkler. Later, the shotgun is identified as the murder weapon. At the station, Mary admits she may have shot her husband, which shocks the community and her parents-in-law. At first, Mary refuses to divulge more about the incident and refuses to say anything negative about her husband, but her lawyer convinces her to reveal Matthew's darker, hidden side.

Mary reveals that Matthew, despite his kind pastor image, was an angry and abusive man, who engaged in physical and emotional abuse when she did something that angered him. She had never revealed this to anyone because her religious beliefs led her to silence. Matthew threatened to hurt or kill her to make her keep quiet. Mary also revealed Matthew tried to tax cheat the money she won in a lottery to pay their bills by having her put it in an account at another bank under her name. When the bank calls and asks her husband and her to meet them due to suspicions about the money, Mary tells Matthew about it on the night before he is murdered, but Matthew has no intention to follow her to the bank, citing since the account was under her name, it was her problem to deal with it. Mary refuses to reveal more of the abuses she suffered from Matthew to her lawyer, but upon learning her parents-in-law have not given her daughters her letters over what happened, making her eldest believe she murdered their father in cold blood, Mary finally reveals it to not lose custody of her daughters.

Mary reveals to the court that Matthew was a hypocrite who forced her to dress up like a hooker before they had sex and made her watch online pornography so they could re-enact it even when she did not want to. The years of abuse and financial situation were taking their toll on Mary's mental state, and what finally broke her was when hours before Matthew was killed, he tried to suffocate their baby daughter as he was unable to sleep due to the baby's cries. Unable to stand it any longer, in the early morning hours, Mary brings out the shotgun and pokes it on her sleeping husband at their bed to wake him up as she wanted to have a serious discussion with him about stopping the abuse. However, Mary was standing on a slippery rug, which caused her to fall and accidentally pull the trigger and shoot her husband. Upon realizing what she has done, a confused Mary decides to run away with her daughters. After this revelation, she tells the jury that despite the abuse she suffered, Mary still loves Matthew and never wanted to kill him, she just wanted him to stop mistreating her. After jury makes their decision, the jury finds Mary not guilty of murder, but guilty of involuntary manslaughter, much to Mary's lawyers and supporters joy.

Throughout the film, various people who knew or met the Winklers are interviewed about their opinions of the case. While some refuse to believe that Matthew was an abusive man and Mary was guilty and got away with murder, others believe he was and Mary was innocent and was only defending herself and her children. Even Matthew's parents are interviewed, who each have their different opinions. While his mother does not believe in Mary's story that Matthew was abusive, Matthew's father, however, believes he was, but thinks Mary did not kill Matthew accidentally, but purposely as revenge, and is willing to forgive her if she confesses the truth.

== Cast ==
- Rose McGowan as Mary Winkler
- Martin Cummins as Steve Farese, Sr.
- Michael Shanks as Matthew Winkler
- Eric Keenleyside as Dan Winkler
- Carrie Genzel as Elizabeth Rice
- Kyra Zagorsky as Tara Bayless
- Julia Sarah Stone as Hannah
- Erin Simms as Female Reporter
- Lilah Fitzgerald as Emily Winkler

== Reception ==
Variety said, "From the pre-opening credit moment when authorities roll out a shrouded body as concerned neighbors look on, it’s clear “The Pastor’s Wife” is a Lifetime movie like momma used to make ’em: Fact-based, trashy and featuring an imperiled young woman."
