= A Quiet Teacher =

2022 novel by Adam Oyebanji

- Author: Adam Oyebanji
- Language: English
- Publisher: Severn House
- Publication date: 2022
- Pages: 224 (first edition)
- ISBN: 978-1-4483-0942-9

A Quiet Teacher is a 2022 crime thriller novel by Scottish-Nigerian writer Adam Oyebanji published by Severn House. Oyebanji's second novel and first crime-thriller, the story centres on Greg Abimbola, an ex-spy who settles as a high school teacher.

== Background ==
Adam Oyebanji, who was born in Scotland, works in counterterrorist financing having graduated from Birmingham University and Harvard Law School. In April 2022, he published his debut novel, Braking Day, a science fiction novel.

In early 2022, Severn House acquired rights to A Quiet Teacher which was published in November 2022.

== Awards and reception ==
The novel was included in 100 Notable Books of 2022 by Brittle Paper.

Publishers Weekly concluded that "Oyebanji smoothly inserts commentary on topical social and political issues." noting that "readers will eagerly await his next mystery" while Kirkus Reviews concluded that "Oyebanji's hero is complicated and sure to win readers’ sympathies."
