= Lucinda Pierce Mystery series =

Book series by Diane Fanning

Twisted Reason
- Author: Diane Fanning
- Language: English
- Genre: Crime fiction
- Publisher: Severn House
- Publication date: 2011
- Publication place: United States
- Pages: 223
- ISBN: 978-0-7278-6945-6

The Lucinda Pierce Mystery series is a book series written by American non-fiction author and novelist Diane Fanning, debuted in 2008 with The Trophy Exchange. The four-part series, released by Severn House in the UK and US, features Virginia Homicide Detective Lucinda Pierce as she follows the evidence and investigates murders. Known for her non-fiction true crime books, Publishers Weekly described the series as "double duty for Fanning."

Publishers Weekly, in a later review of Twisted Reason, fourth in the series, wrote, "Edgar-finalist Fanning skillfully illuminates the heartbreaking challenges facing Alzheimer’s victims and their families in her fourth mystery featuring Virginia homicide detective Lucinda Pierce." Also with the release of Twisted Reason, the New Braunfels Herald-Zeitung newspaper wrote, because Alzheimer's was something the author had witnessed first-hand with her father and father-in-law, "When New Braunfels author Diane Fanning wrote Twisted Reason, the fourth in the Lucinda Pierce mystery series, she cried as she wrote certain passages."

== Plot summaries ==
=== The Trophy Exchange ===
In the first of the series, Lieutenant Lucinda Pierce has been having a difficult time. She lost an eye and disfigured her face responding to a domestic violence call. Now she is faced with a serial killer, and her main suspect is a respected doctor known for his international relief work. To catch him she is forced to bend the rules.

=== Punish the Deed ===
A mutilated body is found sprawled on an office kitchen's floor. Beside it a note read: "I was left behind." Homicide Detective Lucinda Pierce chases a killer whose targets are heads of nonprofit agencies.

=== Mistaken Identity ===
In a suburban home, a woman’s body is carefully laid out on a bed. In the bathroom, a male corpse is missing both its head and its hands. When the victims’ 13-year-old son claims his father is immortal, Lieutenant Pierce suspects that the family has something to hide.

=== Twisted Reason ===
A missing elderly man with Alzheimer's disease shows up dead on his son’s front porch, leading homicide detective Lucinda Pierce to investigate the mysterious deaths of other Alzheimer's sufferers in the area.

=== False Front ===
When Candace Eagleton is murdered after her marriage is revealed to be a scam, Lucinda Pierce vows to catch the killer.

=== Wrong Turn ===
When the body of Emily Sherman is found in the basement of a serial killer, Homicide Detective Lucinda Pierce must go back to the original case to right the wrong she did years ago.

=== Chain Reaction ===
Lucinda Pierce comes face-to-face with terrorism when she is called out to the site of a bomb blast at a local high school.

== Reviews ==
Kirkus Reviews' 2008 review of The Trophy Exchange described author Fanning as producing "an exciting, emotionally intense story with a complex heroine whose future adventures will be widely anticipated."

Kirkus wrote in 2010 when Punish the Deed was released that Lucinda "is such a strong heroine that she should engage many readers."

For Twisted Reason, Kirkus wrote, "As usual, Fanning poses Lucinda a quirky mystery, this time providing a thoughtful look at the stress of those caring for loved ones with dementia."

Library Journal, in its review of Twisted Reason, said that "true crime author Fanning brings a rare brand of realism to her work."
