= Poisoning of Margaret Warden =

1827 poisoning case in Scotland

In September 1826, Margaret Warden, a 24-year-old servant living near Dundee, Scotland, died of arsenic poisoning. She was pregnant at the time of her death; the father was George Smith, the son of Warden's employers, Mary and David Smith. The attending doctor initially thought Warden died of cholera, but rumours of poisoning soon spread and she was exhumed. Her stomach contents were tested; arsenic was found, and Mary Smith was committed in October for trial in Edinburgh for her murder. Her defence advocates called nearly fifty witnesses, and the trial was delayed twice to allow the prosecution time to prepare. When the trial began on 5 February 1827, the illness of a juror led to the trial being restarted on 19 February with a new jury.

The advocates for the defence included Francis Jeffrey and Henry Cockburn, both leading Scottish advocates of the day; the prosecution was led by William Rae, the Lord Advocate. Testimony at the trial made it clear that Smith had given Warden something to drink shortly before she became ill. The defence called witnesses who testified that Warden had said she would "do some ill to hersel" and similar statements that implied she might have committed suicide. The medical evidence for the presence of arsenic was questioned by the defence, but in his instructions to the jury, the judge, David Boyle, told them that they should accept as fact Warden's death by arsenic, and consider whether it had been administered by Smith. Boyle's instructions concluded at 5:30 a.m. on 20 February, about twenty hours after the trial began. At 2:00 p.m. that afternoon, the jury returned a verdict of not proven, acquitting Smith of the crime.

The trial was described in 1923 by the historian A. H. Millar as "in several particulars ... the most remarkable trial that ever took place in Scotland". It was the subject of much contemporary interest, and accounts of it were published that recorded the testimony of the many witnesses who were called. Popular opinion at the time was that Smith, who became known as "the Wife o Denside", was guilty, and ballads were written about the case. One of Smith's own defence lawyers later wrote that he was sure she had committed the murder. The writer Walter Scott attended the reading of the verdict, and had no doubt of Smith's guilt; he commented afterwards that "if that woman was my wife, I should take good care to be my own cook!"

== Background ==
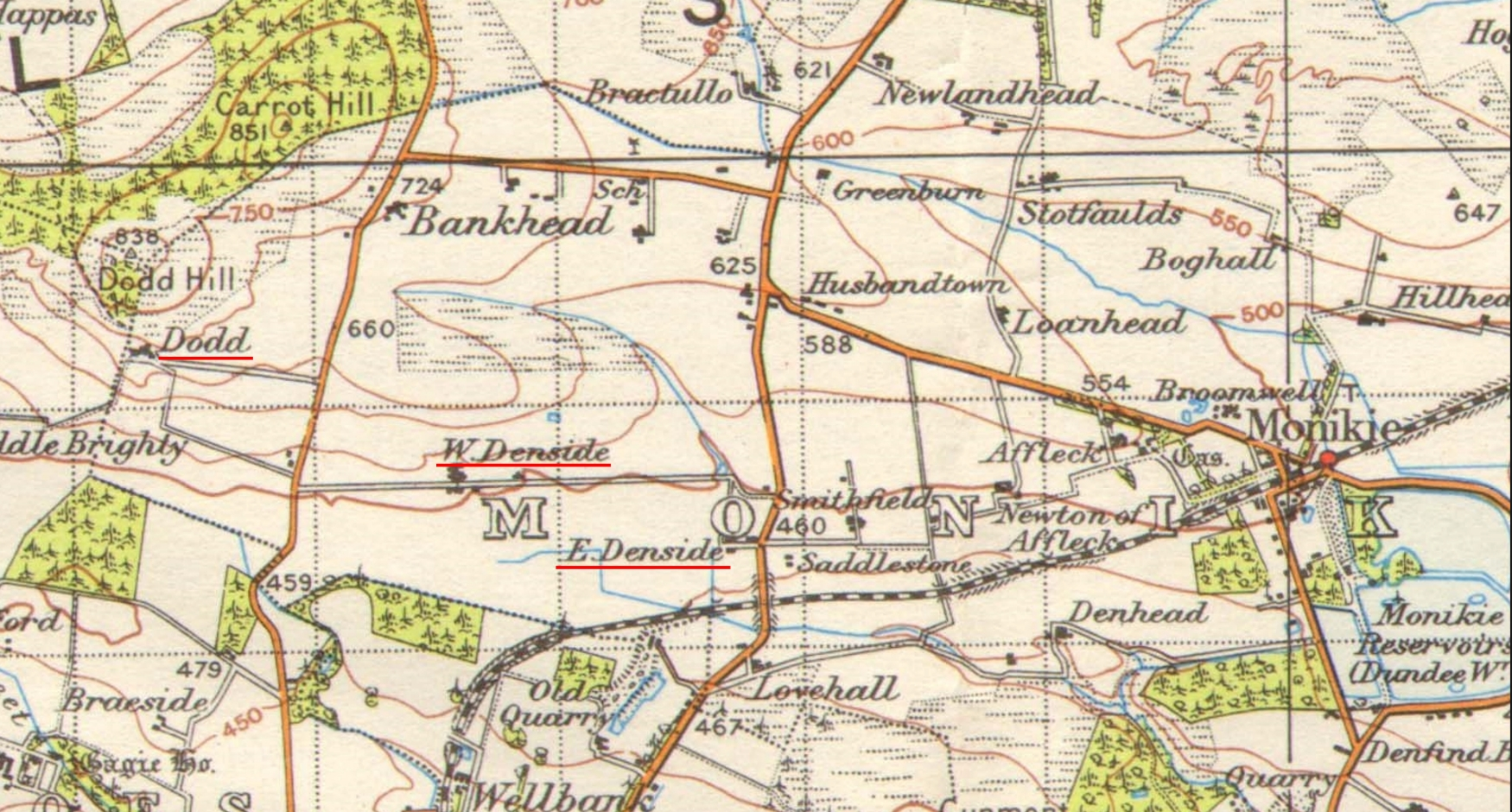
David Smith's three farms, near Monikie in Angus – Dodd, West Denside, and East Denside – shown on a 1946 map underlined in red

In 1826 David Smith and his family were living at West Denside, and working three farms; West Denside, East Denside, and Dodd, about six miles north of Dundee, in Scotland. (Note: Sources disagree on how long the Smiths had been farming there; A. H. Millar says the farms were occupied by the Smiths in about 1825, but William Roughead says that the Smiths had been living at West Denside for twenty years, and gives examples of events that happened at the farm three and four years earlier.) Smith's wife was named Mary, and their youngest son was George. Among the servants at the farm was Margaret Warden, aged 24 in 1826. Warden had previously been pregnant in 1821; the name of the father is not recorded. Warden left the farm to have the baby at her mother's house, where the child was subsequently raised, and Warden returned to work at West Denside.

== Warden's pregnancy and death ==
In July 1826 Mary Smith learned that Warden was pregnant again, this time by her son George, who was considering marrying her. Smith did not approve, and Warden decided to leave the farm. She briefly returned to her mother's house but soon came back to West Denside, staying a fortnight before leaving again. After a week Mary Smith went to the Wardens' home and persuaded her to return, and while there she spoke to Warden's mother about the unwanted pregnancy and said she would "get something for Margaret" in Dundee.

At 10:00 in the evening on Tuesday, 5 September, Smith gave Warden a small glass of a white, creamy mixture, and a lump of sugar. Warden drank the mixture, and began to feel ill that night. Jean Norrie, the servant who shared her box-bed, woke to find Warden already awake, but she was too sick to work and Norrie helped her back to bed. Warden's condition worsened the next night; her symptoms included vomiting, thirst and stomach pain. Smith and Norrie sat up with her on the night of Thursday 7 September, and the next morning, at Warden's request, Smith sent for Warden's mother. Her mother sent for a doctor, and set out for West Denside. The doctor, whose name was Taylor, arrived in the afternoon, and examined Warden; in his words, "her countenance was sunken and ghastly; the whole body, and particularly the hands and feet, were covered with a cold perspiration; there was no pulse at the wrists or temples, and very indistinct pulsations over the heart—about 150 in a minute". Taylor did not suspect poisoning; he believed that Warden was suffering from cholera. He told Smith that Warden was dying, and left the farm. Warden died at 9:00 that night; her last words were "My mistress gave me...", but she did not complete the sentence. She was buried on 10 September in Murroes parish church.

== Exhumation and investigation ==
Rumours began to spread that Warden had been poisoned by Smith because of her pregnancy, and her body was exhumed on 30 September. A post-mortem was conducted by three doctors: the Dr Taylor who had visited Warden at West Denside, and two other doctors from Dundee, named Ramsay and Johnston. The post-mortem was performed in the open air, on a gravestone in Murroes churchyard. The stomach and intestines were removed for further examination, and judging from the foetus, Warden was estimated to have been three months pregnant. The samples were tested for arsenic by Dr Ramsay and Dr Johnston, neither of whom had performed these tests before. Due to illness Ramsay did not attend every test, but Taylor was present. Samples were also sent to Professor Robert Christison for testing. (Note: Dr Johnston's evidence at the subsequent trial included a list of the different tests applied to detect arsenic: "The tests first applied were the liquid tests, which are directed to ascertain the presence of arsenic by the appearance of certain precipitates. These tests were, 1. nitrate of silver, ammonia being previously added to the suspected fluid; 2. sulphate of copper; 3. ammoniuret of copper; 4. nitrate of silver, supercarbonate of potass being previously added to the suspected liquor; 5. sulphuret of potass; 6. lime water ... I then applied other tests, for we did not consider the liquid tests, although they conveyed a very strong conviction, as absolutely conclusive. We went on to try the reduction of the suspected matter to the original metal; we mixed a portion of the suspected matter with black flux in a tube, and by heat procured that crust which is considered characteristic of metallic arsenic. The result completely confirmed us in our opinion ... Another experiment was the passing of sulphuretted hydrogen gas through the solution of the contents; a yellow precipitate was formed, which we afterwards decomposed with black flux, and another crust was procured characteristic of metallic arsenic." Christison's testimony included a commentary on Johnston's and Ramsay's methods: he said some of them were not correct tests, and others were not in themselves definite proof of the presence of arsenic, but "taken conjunctly they form satisfactory evidence".)

The investigation led to Mary Smith being summoned to Dundee to be questioned. She refused to attend, saying she was unwell, but after being examined by Dr Johnston she met the Sheriff (Note: In Scotland a sheriff is a judge.) at Four Mile House, an inn partway between the farm and Dundee, on 2 October. She testified that she had given Warden nothing but castor oil in "lozenger wine", (Note: Lozenger wine was "a kind of sherbet made from a pellet of cream of tartar and bicarbonate of soda".) and that there was no poison kept at the farm. The Sheriff kept her in the Dundee prison overnight, and in the morning she changed her testimony, saying now that she recalled she had acquired some rat poison from Dundee a few days before Warden's death, and had left poisoned food in the walls of the loft above the bothy (a small farm building) as they had an infestation of rats. She also said she did not know it was poison—she had simply asked for "something to put away rats".

== Trial ==
=== Delays ===
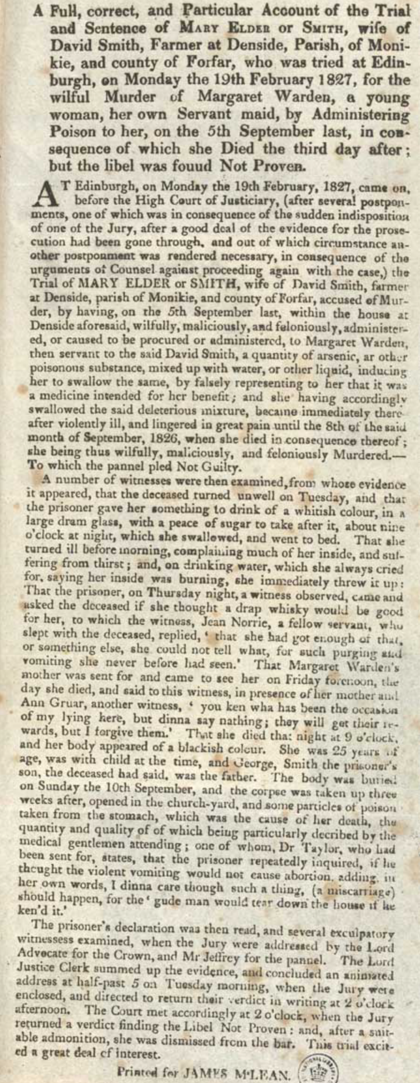
Contemporary pamphlet about the trial

Smith was committed for trial in Edinburgh on 12 October, and indicted on 12 December, with a trial date of 28 December. The lead defence lawyers were Francis Jeffrey and Henry Cockburn, both among Scotland's leading advocates: Cockburn would be appointed Solicitor General four years later. The prosecution was led by William Rae, the Lord Advocate, and included Robert Dundas and Archibald Alison. The bench consisted of David Boyle, the Lord Justice Clerk, and all five of the Lords Commissioners of Justiciary.

Smith's lawyers took advantage of an option in Scots law called "running criminal letters", a legal option that forced the prosecution to complete its case within sixty days, otherwise the accused would be freed. The trial was delayed twice: Smith's lawyers notified the prosecution on 27 December that they proposed to present a defence of suicide, and to call forty-eight witnesses, and Rae asked for an adjournment to give him time to prepare. Rae's review of the new evidence was not completed by the new date of 12 January 1827, and another adjournment was requested.

The trial finally began on 5 February, at about 9:30 in the morning. At 5:30 p.m., one of the jurors fell ill and the proceedings were paused while two doctors present at the trial, Dr Mackintosh and Professor Robert Christison, attended to him. Christison returned to the court and testified that the juror had had an epileptic fit and would have to be excused from the case. This led to another delay to determine whether the case could be continued, or if a new indictment should be sought. The question was a new one in Scottish jurisprudence; no similar incident had occurred before. The court met again a week later, on 12 February; Rae was joined by John Hope, the Solicitor General for Scotland. Rae argued that a new jury should be seated; Cockburn objected that the trial could not continue based on the same indictment for which the jury had been originally sworn in. The judges decided for Rae, and the trial was begun again on 19 February with a new jury.

=== Testimony ===
Norrie testified that Warden had told her that Smith had promised to get her something: Smith had known she was pregnant, "but she would have something for her, be the cost what it would". According to Norrie, Smith had told her there was no poison in the house except some king's yellow, a sulfide of arsenic, and that she had given Warden nothing but castor oil. Norrie said she had only ever seen one rat in the cowshed and had never heard of rat poison being set. Under Jeffrey's cross-examination Norrie repeated some words of Warden's about being unfit for her work, and "wad surely do some ill to hersel". Barbara Small, another of the servants at West Denside, testified that she had never heard Warden say she might harm herself. Mrs. Warden, Margaret's mother, repeated the conversations she had had with Margaret, making it clear that the pregnancy had not led to a rift between them and that Margaret would have been welcome to stay with her at her home, and had planned to until Smith persuaded her to return to West Denside. Another servant, Ann Brown, said she had spoken to Warden shortly before her death, and Warden had said she "wad put an ill end to hersel". The family physician, Dr Dick of Dundee, confirmed that Smith had bought an ounce and a half of arsenic from him, and that he had made sure she knew it was poisonous.

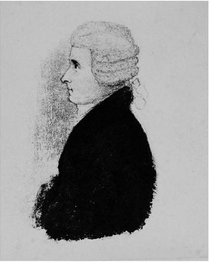
Henry Cockburn, one of the defending advocates

Medical evidence came from a doctor called by the defence, who testified that he had examined Mary Smith on 1 October, and again on 2 October after she had been questioned at Four Mile House by the Sheriff, and concluded that she was not in a fit state to be examined and might have been suffering from loss of memory. Dr Johnston, who had examined her on 1 October, testified that she had seemed fit and able at that time. All three of the doctors who had conducted the post-mortem gave evidence, and stated the cause of death as poisoning by arsenic; Professor Christison was also called as a medical witness and agreed with the diagnosis. There was some disagreement over when the fatal dose of arsenic had been administered, since the symptoms appeared more slowly than would normally be expected. Ramsay considered that the dose Warden took on the evening of Tuesday 5 September must have been arsenic, but Christison believed it must have been administered later than that. Two doctors were called to testify for the defence: Dr Fyfe argued that Christison's explanation of the appearance of the arsenic in the post-mortem was unlikely to be correct, and Dr Mackintosh tried to assert that Warden might have died of cholera, though under cross-examination he admitted he himself believed that arsenic had been the cause of death. (Note: In Christison's autobiography, he gives a detailed account of this part of the testimony, in which Rae gradually forced Mackintosh from asserting the death was from cholera to admitting that it was undoubtedly caused by arsenic. Christison quotes Rae's final remark as a partially sotto voce "what the devil brought you here?".)

Three more witnesses were called to support the idea that Warden had said she might "put away wi hersel"; two were farm servants and one had met Warden when passing through. The ratcatcher who had visited the farm, Andrew Murray, was called, and testified that he had been at West Denside to kill rats about three years ago, and had left arsenic so they could deal with any further infestations. He had visited another farm of Smith's, a mile and a half away, in 1825, and had again left arsenic behind. Smith's defence lawyers had asked him to examine West Denside recently; he had done so and found some evidence of rats, but had not seen any. Smith's son-in-law, James Millar, testified that he had only seen one rat since May. The final witness was a merchant, Robert Esson, from Broughty Ferry, who testified that shortly before Warden's death a small boy had attempted to buy twopence worth of arsenic, which Esson refused to sell; the court would not allow the prosecution to ask if the boy had said he came from Denside farm, on the grounds that Esson's report on the matter would be hearsay.

=== Closing arguments ===
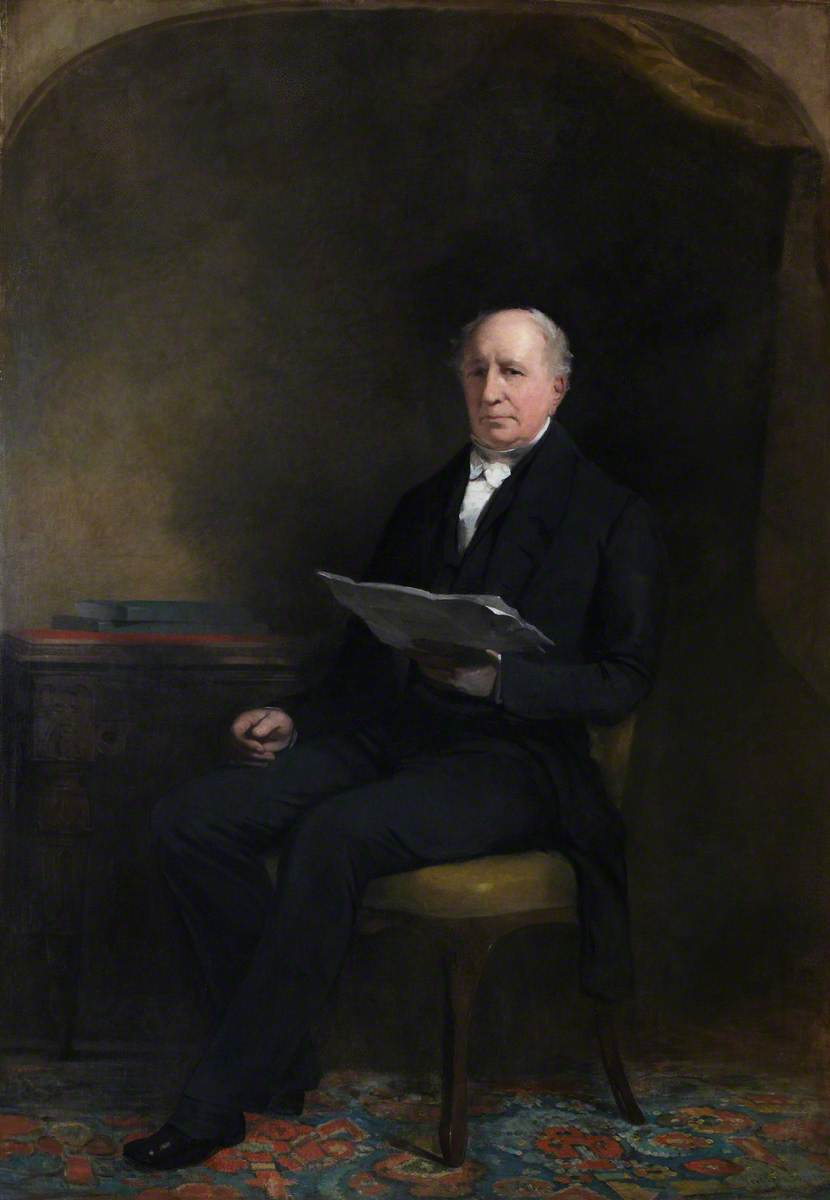
Lord Boyle, the judge presiding at the trial

It was 11:00 in the evening of the day of the trial when Rae began his summing up of the case for the prosecution. He argued that it was clear from the medical evidence that Warden died of arsenic poisoning, and that the only reasonable question was whether she might have killed herself. He said it was clear from the evidence of Norrie and Mrs. Warden that suicide was not a plausible explanation; Warden had been pregnant before and had lived at her mother's house to have the baby, so suicide was only possible if Warden was estranged from her mother. The testimony of servants that Warden had been considering harming herself had never been mentioned to anyone until the trial, even when Warden was ill. It was clear Smith had given Warden something to drink on Tuesday night, and that the symptoms began then. For motive, it was clear that she had wanted to cause an abortion, to avoid the disgrace a child would cause for her family, and her husband's likely anger, but when she obtained the poison it was likely she decided to use it for murder. He cited Smith's changing testimony as evidence of her guilt.

Jeffrey responded for the defence; his speech began at 1:00 a.m. He argued that there was no motive for Smith to commit such a crime, and that cholera was the more likely cause of death. He cast doubt on the medical tests, saying he "had a great respect for science; but there were uncertainties, blunders; and it was the pride of one age to rear up theories to be trampled down and triumphed over by the next". He highlighted the disagreement between Christison and Ramsay as to the timing of the dose, saying that this meant there was no direct proof of the administration of the poison by Smith. He dwelt on the evidence for suicide, and suggested that a desire to procure something to produce an abortion was no evidence of a desire to commit murder. He suggested that if Warden had known she had been poisoned by Smith she would have told other witnesses, and he reinforced the idea that Smith was not fit to have been examined, and that therefore they should ignore that testimony. He concluded by asking for a verdict of not proven, rather than not guilty. (Note: "Not proven" was a verdict available in Scots law in addition to "not guilty" and "guilty". The law did not define how "not proven" was different from the other two verdicts. The force of a "not proven" verdict was identical to that of "not guilty": the prisoner was acquitted and could not be retried for the same offence. It has been interpreted in various ways, often as indicating that the jury did not consider the defendant innocent, only that there was doubt sufficient to exclude a "guilty" verdict. It was sometimes used as a "refuge" by juries in capital cases where they did not feel the death sentence was appropriate.)

It was 3:00 a.m. by the time Boyle began his instructions to the jury. The jury stood when the speech began; ordinarily they would have been allowed to resume their seats, but for some reason this permission never came and they were forced to remain on their feet for the two and a half hours until Boyle's instructions were completed. Boyle told the jury that the defence's objections to Smith's testimony should be ignored, but it was up to them to assess her credibility. He also told the jury that the disagreement on the timing of the poisoning did not mean the prosecution's case was untenable; the indictment did not require that the poison was taken on the Tuesday or Thursday. He discussed the question of whether Warden died of arsenic poisoning, and told the jury this was proved by the medical evidence; the question for the jury to consider was whether the arsenic had been administered by Smith. If they did not consider it likely that Warden had committed suicide, they should find Smith guilty. At 5:30 on the morning of Tuesday 20 February, Boyle completed his instructions and adjourned until 2:00 that afternoon.

== Verdict and aftermath ==
The verdict was "not proven", and it was unanimous. The trial was closely followed by the public. The Dundee Courant reported that "Not only the Court-room, but the Out House, the Lobbies, and the Parliament Square were filled with crowds of persons anxious to hear the result; and though the weather was intensely cold, yet they remained in the streets during the whole night, and at two and three o'clock in the morning every door was as closely besieged as at ten o'clock on the preceding morning of Monday". Smith's friends took her to the local prison from the court, to protect her from the crowds.

The trial was described in 1923 by the historian A. H. Millar as "in several particulars ... the most remarkable trial that ever took place in Scotland". The writer Walter Scott attended the reading of the verdict, and said of Mary Smith:

She is clearly guilty, but as one or two witnesses said the poor wench hinted an intention to poison herself, the jury gave that bastard verdict, Not Proven. I hate that Caledonian medium quid (Note: That is, an intermediate verdict.) ... It was a face to do or die, or perhaps to do to die. Thin features, which had been handsome, a flashing eye, an acute and aquiline nose, lips much marked, as arguing decision, and, I think bad temper—they were thin, and habitually compressed, rather turned down at the corners, as one of a rather melancholy disposition.

Cockburn also believed in Smith's guilt; he later described her as "guilty, but acquitted, of murder by poison", and agreed with Scott's description of her, adding that "She was like a vindictive masculine witch". Cockburn also quoted Scott as saying, when the verdict was given, "Well, sirs, all I can say is, that if that woman was my wife, I should take good care to be my own cook!"

Smith became known as "The Wife o Denside", and under that name was still spoken of in Dundee until at least the 1920s. Ballads were written and sung about her, declaring her guilt; Millar collected one such in 1884 from Barbara Small, who had been a witness at the trial. The last verse was:

Oh! Jeffrey, oh! Jeffrey, ye hinna dune fair,
For ye've robbed the gallows o its ain lawfu heir
An it hadna been you an your great muckle fee
She'd hae hung like a trout at the Cross o Dundee!

== See also ==
- Lists of poisonings

== Sources ==
- Barbato, Joseph M. (2004). "Scotland's bastard verdict: intermediacy and the unique three-verdict system" (PDF). Indiana International & Comparative Law Review. 15 (3): 543–581. doi:10.18060/17848.
- Christison, Robert (1827). "Account of the medical evidence in the case of Mrs Smith, tried at Edinburgh in February last for murder by poison, with notes and commentaries". Edinburgh Medical and Surgical Journal. 27 (91): 441–472. PMC 5763237. PMID 30330077 – via HathiTrust.
- Cockburn, Henry (1983) [1888]. Circuit Journeys. Hawick, Scotland: Byways. ISBN 0-907448-03-8.
- MacIver, Ian (1979). "Cockburn and the Church". In Bell, Alan (ed.). Lord Cockburn: A Bicentenary Commemoration 1779-1979. Edinburgh, Scotland: Scottish Academic Press. pp. 68–103. ISBN 978-0-7073-0245-4.
- Millar, A. H. (1923). Haunted Dundee. Dundee, Scotland: Malcolm C. MacLeod.
- Roughead, William (1913). Twelve Scots Trials. Edinburgh, Scotland: William Green & Sons.
- Roughead, William (1932) [1922]. Glengarry's Way (Revised ed.). Edinburgh, Scotland: W. Green & Son, Ltd.
- Scott, Walter (1927) [1890]. The Journal of Sir Walter Scott (1825–1832) From the Original Manuscripts at Abbotsford. Edinburgh, Scotland: Douglas & Foulis.
- Symes, David (1829). Reports of Proceedings in the High Court of Justiciary from 1826 to 1829. Edinburgh, Scotland: Thomas Clark. pp. 71–133.
