= Murder of Amanda Duffy =

1992 murder in the United Kingdom

On 30 May 1992, 19-year-old Scottish student Amanda Duffy was murdered following a night out in Hamilton. The main suspect, Francis Auld, was tried for murder in the High Court of Justiciary in Glasgow and was acquitted when the jury returned a majority verdict of "not proven". A bid by prosecutors to try Auld for a second time on the basis of new evidence was rejected by the courts in 2016. Auld died of pancreatic cancer in July 2017, aged 45.

The outcome of Auld's trial prompted a national conversation around the continued existence of the "not proven" verdict and around double jeopardy rules.

== Murder ==
Duffy, a 19-year-old student at Motherwell College, went missing in the early hours of Saturday 30 May 1992 after a night out with friends in Hamilton, South Lanarkshire. She was celebrating that she had been called to audition at the Royal Scottish Academy of Music and Drama. Her body was found that evening in an area of waste ground near a car park at Miller Street, Hamilton.

Duffy was found "lying on her back, naked from the waist down, with her face and head covered in blood" and branches and twigs "had been inserted into her mouth, nostrils and vagina". According to a post mortem examination, she had died between 1.30 am and 1.30 pm, having suffered extensive blunt force injuries to the head and neck, as well as asphyxia and injuries to the anus and rectum.

== Trial ==
Francis Auld was tried for Duffy's murder in 1992. Witnesses had seen Auld with Duffy between midnight and 1 am. A bite to Duffy's right breast, which would have been "excruciatingly painful" and was inflicted within an hour prior to death, matched Auld's dental features. However, Auld said that he had left Duffy in the company of someone named "Mark", who was never identified. The jury returned a majority verdict of not proven in November 1992.

== Aftermath ==
=== Threatening phone calls ===
In 1994, Auld was convicted of making threatening phone calls to two former friends, and sentenced to 240 hours community service. He admitted telling one of them "Patrick, you thought Amanda was the last. Well, you're next, after Caroline."

=== Civil action ===
In 1995, Duffy's parents sued Auld in civil court, where the standard of evidence is lower. Auld did not contest the lawsuit and the couple were awarded a £50,000 payout. This amount was never paid.

=== Calls to scrap "not proven" verdict ===
Following the verdict in the criminal trial, Duffy's parents launched a high-profile campaign for the "not proven" verdict to be abolished in Scots law. A national petition was launched at an event in Glasgow addressed by Joe Duffy. In 1993, the couple's Member of Parliament, George Robertson, launched the Criminal Procedure (Abolition Of Not Proven Verdict) (Scotland) Bill in the House of Commons to scrap the verdict, though its likelihood of success was considered slim.

The Duffys' campaign also increased pressure on the Scottish Office, which eventually launched a consultation on scrapping the "not proven" verdict in 1994. MP John Home Robertson, in a 1995 bid to scrap the verdict, praised "Kathleen and Joe Duffy for the thoughtful and constructive campaign that they have been waging". When the Scottish Parliament debated scrapping the verdict in 2016, the Duffy case was cited by MSP Michael McMahon in support of scrapping the verdict.

The "not proven" verdict was eventually abolished in 2026.

=== Bid for retrial ===
After the introduction of the Double Jeopardy (Scotland) Act 2011, which allows for a person to be tried twice for the same crime in certain circumstances, Strathclyde Police reopened an investigation into Duffy's murder in 2012 because they believed that "certain people have information in relation to Amanda's murder that they are withholding, perhaps from a sense of misguided loyalty". Police Scotland's cold case unit later re-examined the crime on the instruction of the Crown Office.

In 2015, prosecutors launched a bid under the Act to re-try Auld for the murder. However, the bid was rejected by judges in February 2016. Jim Govan, the chief forensic scientist at the original trial, then went on public record, saying the jury got the verdict wrong and there was more than enough evidence to convict. Auld died of cancer in July 2017.

== See also ==
- List of unsolved murders in the United Kingdom
- David Smith, British murderer who was acquitted of the murder of a sex worker in 1993, only to be convicted of murdering another in 1999. He was finally re-tried for the first murder in 2023 and convicted
- Murders of John Greenwood and Gary Miller, 1980 UK case which has led to calls for further 'double jeopardy' reform
- Murder of Karen Buckley
