= Murder of Maxwell Garvie =

1967 murder in Scotland

Maxwell Garvie was a Scottish farmer and businessman who was murdered in 1968, in "one of the most infamous murders in Scottish criminal history".

The following year his wife, Sheila Garvie, and her lover, Brian Tevendale, were convicted of his murder after a sensational trial at the Aberdeen High Court, which included revelations about group sex and drugs. It was Tevendale who shot Maxwell with a rifle while he was asleep. Later Tevendale disposed of the body in a tunnel at Lauriston Castle, near St Cyrus.

The case against a third accused, Alan Peters, was found not proven.

While alive, Maxwell enjoyed a lascivious life. He was fond of female company and maintained physical relations with many. Tevendale's sister Trudy Birse was just one of them. Maxwell frequently arranged wild parties in his house which involved orgies. At first Sheila was not eager to take part, but eventually did so at her husband's insistence.

Sheila Garvie and Tevendale broke off contact shortly after the trial, they were both released in 1978. Tevendale died in December 2003, whilst Garvie died from Alzheimer's disease in 2014, aged 80.

== See also ==
- Mariticide
