= Mommy's Little Girl =

2009 book by Diane Fanning

- Author: Diane Fanning
- Language: English
- Genre: True crime
- Publisher: St. Martin's Press
- Publication date: November 3, 2009
- Publication place: United States
- Media type: Paperback
- Pages: 352
- ISBN: 978-0-312-36514-1

Mommy's Little Girl: Casey Anthony and her Daughter Caylee's Tragic Fate is a 2009 biographical true crime book by novelist Diane Fanning about 2-year-old Caylee Anthony’s disappearance from her Florida home in July 2008. This was the first book released about the case.

Casey Anthony, Caylee's mother, who was indicted for first-degree murder in the death, faced a capital murder charge in her trial. On the eve of jury selection, author Fanning appeared as a commentator on TruTV's "InSession." After the jury acquitted Anthony, Fanning told My San Antonio that she was "stunned" by the "not guilty" verdict.

== Reviews ==
The Orlando Sentinel, in its 2009 book review, wrote that Fanning "tirelessly recounts the young woman's lying ways, theorizes how Anthony might have disposed of her daughter and concludes that Anthony is 'an individual whose self-absorption and insensitivity to others is a destructive force.'"

The producers of CBS's 48 Hours wrote in their review, "This timely account weaves together the details surrounding this highly publicized case. Additionally, WKMG in Orlando gave it a thumbs-up, saying the book "condenses those thousands and thousands of court documents into an easy-to-read story."
