= Diane Fanning =

American crime writer and author

- Born: Diane Lynn Butcher; June 21, 1950 (age 76); Baltimore, Maryland, U.S.
- Education: Perry Hall High School; Lynchburg College
- Occupations: Crime writer; mystery novelist
- Writing career
- Period: 2000–present
- Genre: Crime fiction
- Subject: True crime
- Notable work: Mommy's Little Girl
- Notable awards: Edgar Award nomination
- Website: www.dianefanning.com

Diane Fanning (born June 21, 1950) is an American crime writer and author who writes nonfiction and mystery novels.

== Biography ==
Fanning was born Diane Lynn Butcher in Baltimore, Maryland. She graduated from Perry Hall High School, and then Lynchburg College in Virginia, where she majored in chemistry. She and her husband live in Bedford, Virginia.

== Career ==
After college, she wrote for the advertising field, earning more than 70 Addy Awards for her work. During that time, she wrote as a freelance writer.

Her career shifted into nonprofit work with a move to New Braunfels, Texas. Fanning worked for fundraising groups, including Another Way Texas Shares and the National Association for Choice in Giving. She began her first book while living in Texas. She is co-founder of Women in Crime Ink, described by The Wall Street Journal as "a blog worth reading."

In 2002, Fanning corresponded with serial killer Tommy Lynn Sells, who, in a letter to her, confessed to murdering 10-year-old Joel Kirkpatrick, whose mother had been convicted of killing her son. According to the Innocence Project, Fanning's testimony before a prison review board about the letter and her book Through the Window, which details Sells' crime spree, were said to help prove Harper's innocence. In 2011, Fanning was given the Defenders of the Innocent Award by the Illinois Innocence Project for getting the confession from Sells.

In 2006, her book Written in Blood received an Edgar Award nomination.

Fanning has been interviewed for CBS's "48 Hours Mystery" in November 2009 and Investigation Discovery in 2010 and 2011. CBS's "Crimesider" column featured her in a story about the Casey Anthony case.

== Awards ==
- 2001: Freedom Fighter Award, National Alliance for Choice in Giving
- 2011: Defenders of the Innocent Award, Illinois Innocence Project

== Books ==
=== Fiction ===
- Bite the Moon (Molly Mullet mystery; Five Star, 2007)

==== Lucinda Pierce Mystery series (Severn House) ====
- The Trophy Exchange (2008)
- Punish the Deed (2009)
- Mistaken Identity (2010)
- Twisted Reason (2010)
- False Front (2012)
- Wrong Turn (2013)
- Chain Reaction (2014)

==== Libby Clark series (Severn House) ====
- Scandal in the Secret City (2014)
- Treason in the Secret City (2016
- Sabotage in the Secret City (2018)

=== Nonfiction ===
- Red Boots & Attitude with Susie Kelly Flatau (Eakin Press, 2002)
- Through the Window (serial killer Tommy Lynn Sells, St. Martin's Press, 2003)
- Into the Water (serial killer Richard Evonitz, St. Martin's Press, 2004)
- Written in Blood (Kathleen Peterson murder, St. Martin's Press, 2005)
- Baby Be Mine (Bobbie Jo Stinnett murder, St. Martin's Press, 2006)
- Gone Forever (Susan McFarland murder, St. Martin's Press, 2006)
- Under the Knife (Dean Faiello case, St. Martin's Press, 2007)
- Out There (Lisa Nowak case, St. Martin's Press, 2007)
- The Pastor's Wife (Matthew Winkler murder, St. Martin's Press, 2008)
- A Poisoned Passion (Wendi Mae Davidson case, St. Martin's Press, 2009)
- Mommy's Little Girl (Casey Anthony case, St. Martin's Press, 2009)
- Her Deadly Web (Raynella Dossett Leath case, St. Martin's Press, 2012)
- Sleep My Darlings (Schenecker double homicide, St. Martin's Press, 2013)
- Bitter Remains (Laura Ackerson murder, Berkley Books, 2016)
- Death on the River (Angelika Graswald case, St Martin's Press, 2019)
