= S.W.A.T.: Under Siege =

- DVD cover
- Directed by: Tony Giglio
- Written by: Jonas Barnes; Keith Domingue
- Based on: S.W.A.T. by Robert Hamner
- Produced by: Neal H. Moritz; Greg Malcolm; Vicki Sotheran
- Starring: Sam Jaeger; Adrianne Palicki; Michael Jai White; Kyra Zagorsky
- Cinematography: Michael Balfry
- Edited by: Charles Robichaud
- Music by: Patric Caird
- Production companies: Destination Films; Original Film; Sodona Films
- Distributed by: Sony Pictures Home Entertainment
- Release date: August 1, 2017
- Running time: 89 minutes
- Country: United States
- Language: English

S.W.A.T.: Under Siege is a 2017 American action film directed by Tony Giglio. It is the third and final installment in the S.W.A.T. film series and was released direct-to-video on August 1, 2017.

== Plot ==
On the morning of Fourth of July, the DEA enlists the help of the Seattle SWAT to storm a drug cartel's waterfront warehouse to capture cartel members and seize a shipment of drugs. A firefight ensues, and when it is over, several DEA agents and one SWAT team member are dead. When the container holding the suspected drug shipment is found and opened, the team is surprised to find a man chained inside. After taking him back to SWAT headquarters, the mysterious man, who is dubbed "The Scorpion", offers information in return for protection, warning them that a party with murderous intentions is after what he knows.

When two fake FBI agents named Franklin and Cox try to collect the prisoner, just as Scorpion had predicted, Travis Hall, the SWAT team's leader, fights them, killing Cox and arresting Franklin, and begins to believe Scorpion. When questioned by Hall and his superior, Inspector Ellen Dwyer, Scorpion reveals himself as a spy and that someone on the SWAT team is a mole for the enemy. Hall decides to move him discreetly, but the terrorists, a mercenary special ops army led by Lars Cohaagen, are aware of Scorpion's detention and have been surveilling the SWAT compound. After being warned by their mole, a heavily armed team assaults the building and the comm channels, security and power systems are hacked. The SWAT team and Scorpion fight back, but two SWAT members are killed, and Cohaagen offers them their and their families' lives in return for Scorpion.

Hall decides to use the handover to stage an ambush in the compound's courtyard, but one of the SWAT team, Ward, warns the attackers and frees Franklin to strike a deal with Cohaagen. Dwyer and Hall intercept them, and Franklin and Ward are killed. The mercenaries, including Cohaagen and his aide Simone, storm the building to kill everyone inside. Scorpion rescues the surviving SWAT officers and stays behind with Hall to search for Dwyer, who got separated. They are found and attacked by Cohaagen and Simone, but kill them after a brutal hand-to-hand fight.

In the aftermath, Scorpion hands Hall and Dwyer a microchip carrying the information he was safeguarding. Then Hall figures out that Dwyer was Cohaagen's inside agent, and a fight ensues. Dwyer shoots Scorpion and flees, but Hall catches and arrests her. Hall is later asked to identify Scorpion's body. Scorpion uses a dead mercenary as a body double, but Hall still identifies the body as Scorpion to let him go free, and returns home to enjoy the fireworks with his family.

== Cast ==
- Sam Jaeger as Travis Hall
- Adrianne Palicki as Ellen Dwyer
- Michael Jai White as "Scorpion"
- Matthew Marsden as Lars Cohaagen
- Kyra Zagorsky as Sophia Gutierrez
- Ty Olsson as Ward
- Olivia Cheng as Chu
- Garvin Cross as Drug Enforcement Agent Weir
- Zahf Paroo as Hooks
- Aren Buchholz as York
- Lisa Chandler as "Phoenix"
- Mike Dopud as Franklin
- Dalias Blake as Cox
- Monique Ganderton as Simone
- Chris Gauthier as Elson
- Marci T. House as Angela Jefferson
- Pascale Hutton as Carley
- Omari Newton as Benson
- Leo Raine as Diego
