= Blackstone Audio =

American audiobook publisher

Blackstone Audio, Inc.
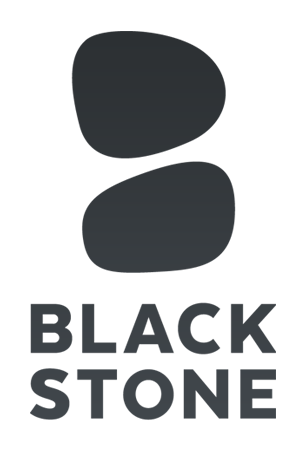
- Type: Private
- Industry: Publishing
- Founded: 1987
- Founder: Craig & Michelle Black
- Headquarters: Ashland, Oregon
- Key people: Josh Stanton (CEO); Grover Gardner (Studio Director)
- Products: Audiobooks, print books, eBooks
- Number of employees: 250–300 (2019)
- Website: www.blackstonepublishing.com

Blackstone Audio is an American independent audiobook publisher, offering over 25,000 audiobooks. The company is based in Ashland, Oregon, with five in-house recording studios. Blackstone distributes directly to consumers via their subscription e-commerce site, Downpour.com, and to the library market with titles from Blackstone, Macmillan, Hachette, HarperCollins, Brilliance, BBC, and Disney Press.

Blackstone has made deals with other audiobook companies where Blackstone manufactures physical CD & MP3 CD format media and distributes them to retail and library locations. Labels under this program include Naxos AudioBooks and Recorded Books.

In 2015, Blackstone expanded with Blackstone Publishing, an imprint devoted to print and e-books.

== History ==
Blackstone was founded in 1987 by Craig and Michelle Black, originally under the name Classics on Tape. The company later assumed the name Blackstone, taken from an English literary magazine. The company's location in Ashland, Oregon was influenced by the proximity of the Oregon Shakespeare Festival, which Blackstone used as a pool for voice actors.

In August 2012, Blackstone launched an audiobook e-commerce/subscription website, Downpour.com, providing Blackstone audio titles as well as other publishers' titles to the retail market. In January 2013 the company was acquired by AudioGO for an undisclosed sum. Ten months later, in October of that year, AudioGO went bankrupt and sold Blackstone and its other US operations back to the Black family, with the UK arm of AudioGO ceasing business operations as it sought a buyer or investor.

In 2017 they bought the direct-to-consumer audiobook retailer AudioEditions, based in Auburn, California.

In January 2019, they announced a deal to exclusively distribute Naxos AudioBooks physical CD titles. Later that year in September, they added Houghton Mifflin Harcourt Audio.

In November 2015, they expanded with Blackstone Publishing, a new imprint devoted to print and e-books. They launched with its first original hardcover, The Blood Flag, a thriller by James W. Huston, and rolled out paperback and e-book editions of four western novels.

In August 2020, Blackstone announced a deal with Recorded Books to exclusively manufacture RB's audiobook titles, more than 14,000 strong, on physical media (CD & MP3) and distribute to retail and library locations in North America.

== Authors ==
Authors published by Blackstone Publishing include John Shirley, Orson Scott Card, Meg Gardiner, Matthew Mather, and John Altman. In 2018, Blackstone acquired the North American unabridged rights for print/e-book and world rights for audio to James Clavell's catalog.

== Awards ==
In December 2011, Blackstone Audio's production of Hamlet at the Oregon Shakespeare Festival was nominated for a Grammy Award for Best Spoken Word Album. In 2014 the company won two Audie Awards.

== See also ==
- List of companies based in Oregon
