= Patrick Sabongui =

Canadian actor and stunt performer

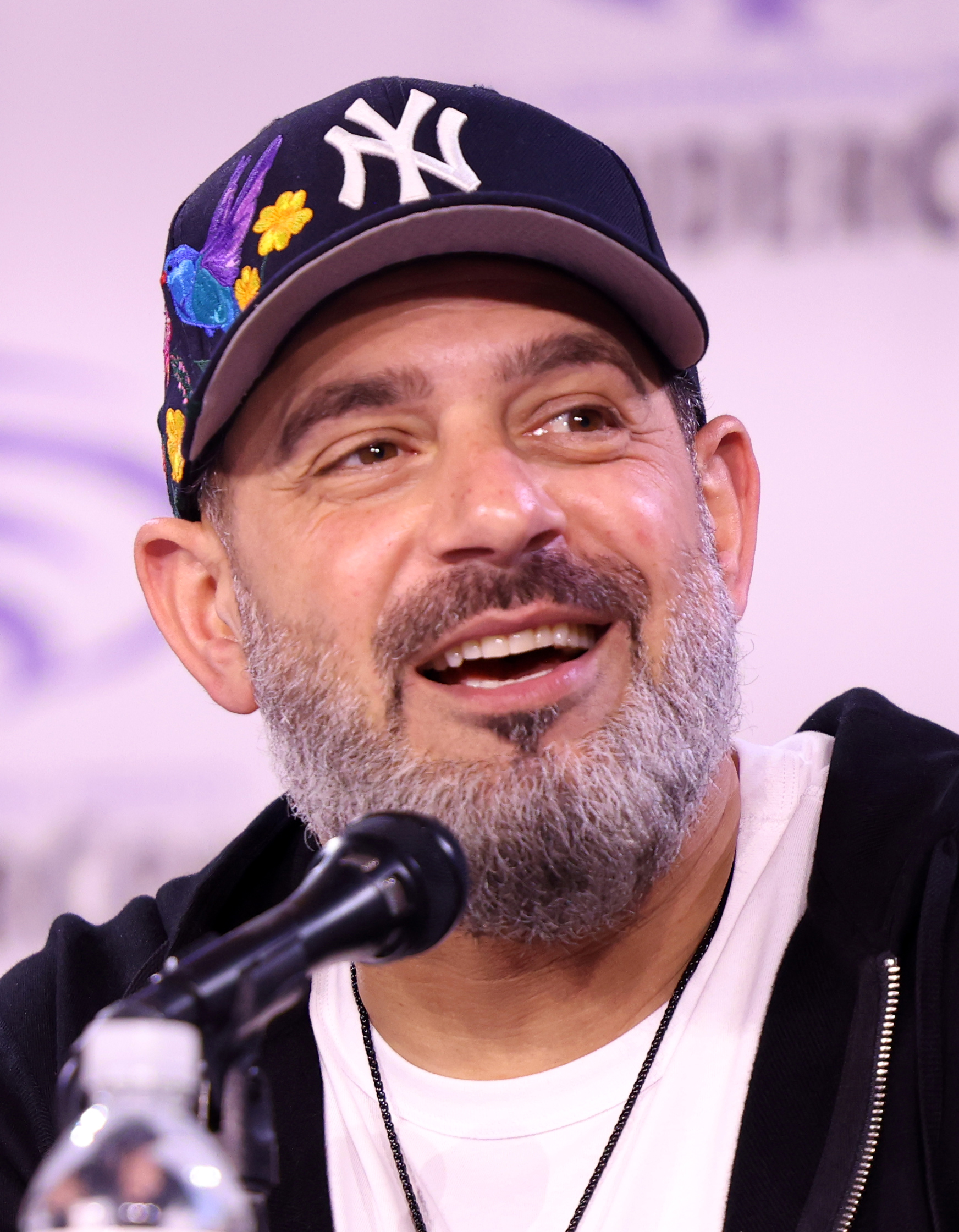
- Sabongui in 2025
- Born: January 9, 1975 (age 51); Montreal, Quebec, Canada
- Education: Concordia University (BFA); UC Irvine (MFA 2005)
- Occupations: Actor, stunt performer
- Years active: 2002–present
- Spouse: Kyra Zagorsky (m. 2002)
- Children: 2

Patrick Sabongui (born January 9, 1975) is a Canadian actor, stunt performer, and drama teacher. He is known for playing David Singh in The Flash.

== Personal life ==
Born to an Egyptian family, Sabongui obtained a BFA in drama for human development at Concordia University. In 2005, he earned a Master of Fine Arts in acting from the University of California, Irvine.

Sabongui lives in Los Angeles and Vancouver with his wife, Kyra Zagorsky, whom he married on August 5, 2002, and their two children.

== Filmography ==
=== TV ===
Year	Title	Character	Role	Notes
2001	Largo Winch	—N/a	Stunt performer	
2004	Il Duce Canadese	—N/a	Stunt performer	TV miniseries
2005	Gamers	Ninja	Actor	Episode: "Mario Tennis"
2006	E-Ring	Man	Actor	Episode: "Hard Cell"
2006	Stargate Atlantis	Taliban guard	Actor	Episode: "Phantoms"
2007	24	Nasir Trabelsi	Stunt performer	Episode: "Day 6: 6:00 p.m. – 7:00 p.m."
2007	Intelligence	Plainclothes Cop #1	Actor	Episode: "We Were Here Now We Disappear"
2008	The L Word	Jamal	Actor	Episode: "LGB Tease"
2008	Stargate Atlantis	Kanaan	Actor	4 episodes
2009	Fringe	Ahmed	Actor	Episode: "Fracture"
2010	Caprica	Weasley bouncer	Actor	Episode: "Ghosts in the Machine"
2011	Flashpoint	Riyaz Fayad	Actor	Episode: "Terror"
2011	Fairly Legal	Roadie	Actor	Episode: "UltraVinyl"
2011	Covert Affairs	Nasir / Khani	Actor	Episode: "Half a World Away"
2011	True Justice	Sniper; El Habib	Actor	2 episodes
2012	Continuum	Matthew Kellog	Stunt double	2 episodes
2012–13	Soldiers of the Apocalypse	—N/a	Second unit director	6 episodes
2012–13	Primeval: New World	Bill Pearson	Actor	2 episodes
2012	Beast	One-eyed man	Actor	Television pilot
2012	Level Up	Unknown	Actor	Episode: "A Leak Among Us"
2013-19	Arrow	Street Dealer; Soldier #2 David Singh	Actor	5 episodes
2013	Red Widow	Cristos	Actor	2 episodes
2013	Arctic Air	Anton	Actor	Episode: "Fool Me Once"
2013	King & Maxwell	Ernesto Ortega	Actor	Episode: "Job Security"
2013	The Runner	Horowitz	Actor	4 episodes
2013	Nikita	Hitter	Actor	Episode: "Pay-Off"
2013	Almost Human	Dr. Keating	Actor	2 episodes (1 uncredited)
2014	The Tomorrow People	Andrew	Actor	Episode: "Rumble"
2014	Rush	Sean	Actor	Episode: "Don't Ask Me Why"
2014–15	The 100	Rebel guard Sindri	Actor	2 episodes
2014–23	The Flash	David Singh	Actor	Recurring role (45 episodes)
2015	Motive	Lance	Actor	Episode: "Fallen"
2015–16	The Art of More	Hassan Al Afsh	Actor	Recurring role (14 episodes)
2016–17	Homeland	Reda Hashem	Actor	6 episodes
2017–18	Beyond	Daniel	Actor	Recurring role (11 episodes)
2017	Shooter	Yusuf Ali	Actor	5 episodes
2017	Supergirl	David Singh	Actor	Episode: "Crisis on Earth-X, Part 1"
2018	The Magicians	Bingle	Actor	Episode: "Heroes and Morons"
2018	The Good Doctor	Russ Milman	Actor	Episode: "Smile"
2018	The Rookie	Ghost Head	Actor	Episode: "Pilot"
2019	The Murders	Paul Ray	Actor	2 episodes
2019	Blood & Treasure	Assim Massod	Actor	2 episodes
2019	Get Shorty	Judah	Actor	4 episodes
2021	Firefly Lane	Chad Wiley	Actor	Recurring role (4 episodes)
2021	Virgin River	Todd Masry	Actor	Recurring role (4 episodes)
2025–2026	The Hunting Party	Jacob Hassani	Actor	Main role

=== Film ===
Year	Title	Character	Role	Notes
2002	Redeemer	Inmate #1	Actor	Television film
2003	Beyond Borders	—N/a	Utility stunt performer	
2003	Timeline	Jimmy Gomez	Actor	
2004	Power Corps.	Sergeant Gums	Actor	
2004	Power Corps.	—N/a	Stunt performer	
2006	300	Persian general	Actor	
2006	300	—N/a	Utility stunt performer	
2007	Afghan Knights	Afghan rebel #1	Stunt actor	
2008	Outlander	—N/a	Stunt player	
2008	Adam's Wall	Kamal	Actor	
2008	The Day the Earth Stood Still	Soldier #1	Actor	
2009	Watchmen	Knot Top leader	Actor	
2009	High Noon	Arnie Meeks	Actor	Television film
2009	Waiting 4 Goliath	Hassan	Actor	Short film
2009	Whiteout	Miami prisoner	Actor	
2009	Whiteout	—N/a	Stunt performer	
2009	The Good Neighbor Policy	Renaud	Actor	
2009	Darkness Waits	Doctor	Actor	
2009	Darkness Waits	Cop #1	Voice actor	
2010	Icarus	Fake Cop #2	Actor	
2010	Merlin and the Book of Beasts	Tristan	Actor	Television film
2010	The Boy Who Cried Werewolf	Monster fan dude	Actor	Television film
2010	Tron: Legacy	Gaming Program 1 - S	Actor	
2011	Goodnight for Justice	Gentleman	Actor	Television film (uncredited role)
2011	Small Currents	Hassan	Actor	Short film
2011	Recoil	Jester	Actor	
2011	Red Riding Hood: The Tale Begins	—N/a	Stunt performer	Short film
2011	Normal	Joe Pompilio	Actor	Television film
2011	Sucker Punch	Earl	Actor	
2011	Gone	Orderly assassin	Stunt actor	Television film
2011	Obsession	Rapist	Actor	Television film
2011	The Twilight Saga: Breaking Dawn – Part 1	—N/a	Stunt performer	
2011	Immortals	Hoplite soldier #3	Actor	
2011	Immortals		Utility stunt performer	
2011	Level Up	Moo-Man	Actor	
2011	Good Morning, Killer	Security guard	Actor	Television film
2012	Chained	Short film	Director	
2012	Chained	Short film	Producer	
2012	Shakey's Coffee	Short film	Director	
2012	Shakey's Coffee	Short film	Producer	
2012	Shakey's Coffee	Short film	Writer	
2012	This Means War	CIA agent	Actor	
2012	The Cabin in the Woods	Elevator guard	Actor	
2012	The ABCs of Death	Unknown	Stunt actor	V is for Vagitus (The Cry of a Newborn Baby) segment
2012	The Bourne Legacy	Unknown	Stunt double	
2013	Goodnight for Justice: Queen of Hearts	Man	Actor	Television film
2013	Warm Bodies	Hunting zombie	Actor	Uncredited role
2013	Warm Bodies	—N/a	Stunt performer	
2013	The Package	Luis	Actor	
2013	White House Down	Bobby	Actor	
2013	The Smurfs 2	Candy Man	Actor	
2014	Toxin	Nolan	Actor	
2014	Toxin	—N/a	Script consultant	
2014	Godzilla	Master Sergeant Marcus Waltz, USAF	Actor	
2014	X-Men: Days of Future Past	—N/a	Stunt performer	
2014	Lonesome Dove Church	Matthew	Actor	
2014	Skin Trade	Detective Russell	Actor	
2014	Night at the Museum: Secret of the Tomb	Amir	Actor	
2015	All of My Heart	Harry	Actor	Television film
2015	Dead Rising: Watchtower	Hippie Zombrex doctor	Actor	
2015	The Marine 4: Moving Target	—N/a	Stunt performer	
2015	Tomorrowland	Eiffel Tower guard #1	Actor	
2015	Perfect High	Mark Taft	Actor	Television film
2015	The Gourmet Detective: A Healthy Place to Die	Lucas	Actor	Television film
2015	Bad Building	—N/a	Second unit director	
2015	Into the Grizzly Maze	Marcus	Actor	
2015	Sorority Murder	Detective Clark	Actor	Television film
2015	A Louder Silence	Khalid	Actor	
2015	Beyond Redemption	Amir	Actor	
2015	Requiem Log #32	Harrison	Actor	Short film
2016	In The Ladies Room	—N/a	Associate producer	
2016	Love on the Sidelines	Shawn	Actor	Television film
2016	Ariel Unraveling	—N/a	Executive producer	
2016	Warcraft	Footman	Actor	
2016	Dead Rising: Endgame	Garth	Actor	
2016	Unclaimed	Constable Buddy Roberts	Actor	
2016	Interrogation	Vasti	Actor	
2017	The Prince	—N/a	Producer	Short film
2017	Power Rangers	Trini's Father	Actor	
2017	Drone	Imir Shaw	Actor	
2017	All of My Heart: Inn Love	Harry	Actor	Television film
2018	Scorched Earth	Womack	Actor	
2018	All of My Heart: The Wedding	Harry	Actor	Television film
2019	Kim Possible	Dr. Glopman	Actor	Television film
2020	Breaking Fast	Hassan	Actor	
2021	Christmas Sail	Luke Fletcher	Actor	Television film
2022	Hello, Goodbye, And Everything In Between	Steve	Actor	
2022	Black Adam	Rami	Actor	

Video game
Year	Title	Role	Character	Notes
2010	Dead Rising 2	Voice actor	Garth	Uncredited role

Web series
Year	Title	Role	Character	Notes
2012	Halo 4: Forward Unto Dawn	Actor	Marine	Recurring role (5 episodes)
