= Not proven =

Obsolete Scots law verdict

Not proven (Scottish Gaelic: gun dearbhadh) was a verdict available to a court of law in Scotland until 2026. From 1728, under Scots law, a criminal trial could end in one of three verdicts, one of conviction ("guilty") and two of acquittal ("not proven" and "not guilty").

Between the Restoration in the late 17th century and the early 18th century, jurors in Scotland were expected only to find whether individual factual allegations were proven or not proven, rather than to rule on an accused's guilt. In 1728, the jury in a murder trial asserted "its ancient right" to declare a defendant "not guilty". Over time, the "not guilty" verdict regained wide acceptance and use amongst Scots juries, with the encouragement of defence lawyers. It eventually displaced "not proven" as the primary verdict of acquittal. Until 2026, juries could return a verdict of either "not guilty" or "not proven", with the same legal effect of acquittal.

Although its effect was the same as a not guilty verdict, research from 2019 using mock juries suggested there was inconsistency in understanding its meaning and confusion about its effect. The Victims, Witnesses, and Justice Reform (Scotland) Act 2025, passed by the Scottish Parliament in September 2025, included provisions that removed the verdict. Since 1 January 2026, only guilty and not guilty verdicts are available in new trials.

== History ==
By the early 17th century, the standard practice of juries in Scotland was to return a finding of "fylet, culpable and convict" or "clene, innocent and acquit". This changed in the late 17th century, at which point the role of the jury became simply to "declare whether or not the facts alleged had been proved", with the judge left to determine, based on that declaration, whether the accused was guilty or not.

There is some disagreement between historians as to why this change happened. David Hume and Hugo Arnot argue that it was rooted in religious oppression. The Crown persecuted the Covenanters but popular support made it impossible to convict them in a jury trial. To pare the power of the jury, the Scottish judges began restricting the jury's role: no longer would the jury announce whether the accused was "guilty" or "not guilty"; instead it would decide whether specific factual allegations were "proven" or "not proven", and the judge would then decide whether to convict.

=== Reintroduction of "not guilty" ===
In 1728, in the trial of Carnegie of Finhaven for the murder of the Earl of Strathmore, the defence lawyer (Robert Dundas) persuaded a jury to reassert its ancient right of acquitting, of finding an accused "not guilty", in spite of the facts being proven. The law required the jury merely to look at the facts and pass a verdict of "proven" or "not proven" depending on whether they believed the evidence proved that the accused had killed the Earl. Carnegie had undoubtedly killed the Earl, but had also clearly not intended to do so. If the jury brought in a "proven" verdict they would in effect constrain the judge to find Carnegie guilty of murder, for which the punishment was hanging. To avert this outcome, the jury asserted what it believed to be their "ancient right" to judge the whole case and not just the facts, and brought in the verdict of "not guilty".

The reintroduction of the "not guilty" verdict was part of a wider movement during the 17th and 18th century which saw a gradual increase in the power of juries, such as the trial of William Penn in 1670, in which an English jury first gained the right to pass a verdict contrary to the law (known as jury nullification), and the trial of John Peter Zenger in New York in 1735 in which jury nullification is credited with establishing freedom of the press as a firm right in what became the United States. Legal academic Ian Willock argues that the 1728 case was "of great significance in calling a halt to a process of attrition which might have led to the total extinction of the criminal jury".

Although jurors continued to use both "not guilty" and "not proven" after 1728, jurors tended to favour the "not guilty" verdict over the "not proven" and the interpretation changed.

In 1827, Walter Scott, who was sheriff in the court of Selkirk, wrote in his journal that "the jury gave that bastard verdict, Not proven." The case he was referring to was the trial of Mary Elder for the poisoning of Margaret Warden.

=== Debate around the verdict ===
There have been repeated calls to abolish the "not proven" verdict since the middle of the 20th century. In 1975, the Thomson Committee on Criminal Procedure in Scotland (chaired by Lord Thomson) recommended retaining the three-verdict system. The Scottish Office consulted on removing "not proven" in 1994. Unsuccessful attempts to scrap the not proven verdict were made in Parliament by Donald Dewar in 1969, George Robertson in 1993 (prompted by the trial outcome in the murder of Amanda Duffy) and Lord Macauly of Bragar in 1995. A member's bill to abolish the not proven verdict was debated in the Scottish Parliament in 2016, but was rejected by 80 votes to 28.

Proponents of abolition argued that the verdict was widely regarded as an acquittal used when the jury did not have enough evidence to convict but was not sufficiently convinced of the accused person's innocence to bring in a not guilty verdict. Conversely, its opponents argued that a two-verdict system would lead to an increase in wrongful convictions.

Following a not proven verdict in a rape trial in 2015, the victim, known as "Miss M", successfully sued Stephen Coxen in the civil courts, in what was the first civil damages action for rape following an unsuccessful criminal prosecution in almost 100 years.

=== Abolition ===
In April 2023, the Scottish government published the Victims, Witnesses, and Justice Reform (Scotland) Bill, which included a provision to abolish the not proven verdict. The bill passed in the Scottish Parliament in September 2025. Alongside this there were a number of other changes to the Scottish justice system, including; creating a specialist sexual offences court; changing the threshold required for a conviction in a jury trial to a two-thirds majority; and implementing Suzanne's Law which will require the parole board to take into account if a killer continues to refuse to reveal where they hid their victim's body. The legislation received Royal Assent on 30 October 2025, and on 11 December a commencement order was laid in the Scottish Parliament that removed the not proven verdict for new trials from 1 January 2026.

== Procedure prior to abolition ==
In Scotland, a criminal case may be decided either in solemn procedure by a jury (instructed by the judge), or in summary procedure by the judge alone (with no jury appointed). There are various rules for when the one or the other procedure may or must be employed; in general, juries are employed for the more severe accusations, while petty crimes and offences are treated summarily. A criminal case jury consisted of fifteen jurors, who made their decision by a simple majority vote: eight votes were necessary and sufficient for the verdict guilty.

As of 1999, approximately one-third of all acquittal verdicts by Scottish juries used the formulation not proven; the others used not guilty. The verdict not proven was also available for judges in the summary procedure, and was employed in about a fifth of such acquittals. The proportion of not proven acquittals was generally higher in the more severe cases, as was the proportion of acquittals versus convictions. This might have many different reasons, for example that on average it might be more difficult to establish guilt beyond a reasonable doubt in more serious cases.

== Use in other jurisdictions ==
In general, the verdict has not been permanently adopted outside Scotland, but it was sometimes used in British colonies, especially in areas where Scottish emigrants had settled.

Its most famous uses in the United States came when Senator Arlen Specter tried to vote "not proven" on the two articles of impeachment of Bill Clinton (his votes were recorded as "not guilty") and when, at the O. J. Simpson murder case, various reformers, including Fred Goldman, Ron Goldman's father, pushed for a change to "not proven" because of what they felt was an incorrect presumption of innocence on the part of Simpson.

The verdict is often referenced in US cases where the jury is obliged to find the state has not proved its case beyond a reasonable doubt, but there is widespread feeling that the defendant does not deserve the exoneration of a "not guilty" verdict. A popular saying about the "not proven" verdict is that it means "not guilty, but don't do it again".

In 2005, a proposal was made in the University of Chicago Law Review to introduce the not proven verdict into the United States.

== Notable cases which resulted in a not proven verdict ==
- Sir Hugh Campbell and Sir George Campbell for being present at the Battle of Bothwell Bridge in 1684
- Mary Smith in the death of Margaret Warden
- Alfred John Monson, in relation to the Ardlamont murder
- Madeleine Smith, accused of murdering her boyfriend by poison
- Helen McDougal, in relation to the Burke and Hare murders
- Alan Peters, in relation to the murder of Maxwell Garvie
- Donald Merrett, tried in February 1927 for the murder of his mother
- John Leslie, in relation to an alleged sexual assault
- Francis Auld, accused of the murder of Amanda Duffy
- Alex Salmond, on a single charge out of the 14 he faced, following the criminal prosecution brought against him

== See also ==
- Jury nullification
- Miscarriage of justice
- Trial by jury in Scotland

== Sources ==
- The Scottish criminal jury: A very peculiar institution, Peter Duff, 62 Law & Contemp. Probs. 173 (Spring 1999)
- Bray, Samuel (2005). "Not Proven: Introducing a Third Verdict". University of Chicago Law Review. 72 (4): 1299–1329. SSRN 1339222.
- Hume, David (1819). Commentaries on the Law of Scotland, volume 2 (2nd ed.). Bell and Bradfute.
- Roughead, William (1913). Twelve Scots Trials. Edinburgh, Scotland: William Green & Sons.
