= The Pastor's Wife (book) =

2008 book by Diane Fanning

- Author: Diane Fanning
- Language: English
- Genre: True crime, Biography
- Publisher: St. Martin's Press
- Publication date: 2008
- English publication date: 2008
- Pages: 320 pp (Paperback ed)
- ISBN: 0-312-94929-4

The Pastor's Wife: The Story of a Minister and the Shocking Death That Divided a Family, by author and novelist Diane Fanning, is a true-crime account of Pastor Matthew Winkler, who was found fatally wounded from a shotgun blast to his back in 2006 at his Fourth Street Church of Christ parsonage in Selmer, Tennessee. The book was released by St. Martin's True Crime Library in November 2008.

The book was the basis for a made-for-TV movie of the same title released by Lifetime Television on November 5, 2011.

== Case information ==
Mary Winkler, the pastor's wife, and their three daughters—aged 8, 6, and 1 at the time—were missing when Matthew's body was discovered, and a search for the family began. They were eventually located on a beach in Alabama, and Winkler was charged with the murder of her 31-year-old husband.

In the months that followed, events surrounding the crime and the Winklers' marriage were exposed nationally, including Winkler's appearance on The Oprah Winfrey Show in 2007.

In April 2007, Winkler was convicted of voluntary manslaughter in the death of her husband and sentenced to 210 days. She served 67 days of her sentence in a mental-health facility.

Winkler's defense team, attorneys Steve Farese, Sr., Leslie Ballin, Tony Farese, and Steve Farese, Jr., with investigator Terry Cox, represented their client pro bono.

== Reception ==
The book was included in the Doubleday Book Club. It was on The Literary Guild's Top 100 bestseller list in the biography category.

Anita Porterfield with The Boerne Star wrote about the book, "With great skill, Fanning guides the reader through the bizarre destructive events of a dysfunctional family culminating with Mary Winkler’s murder trial."
