= Mariticide =

Act of killing one's husband or boyfriend

Mariticide (from Latin maritus "husband" + -cide, from caedere "to cut, to kill") means the killing of one's own husband. It can refer to the act itself or the person who carries it out. It can also be used in the context of the killing of one's own boyfriend. In current common law terminology, it is used as a gender-neutral term for killing one's own spouse or significant other of either sex. Conversely, the killing of a wife or girlfriend is called uxoricide.

== Prevalence ==
According to Centers for Disease Control and Prevention, mariticide made up 30% of the total spouse murders in the United States, data not including proxy murders conducted on behalf of the wife. FBI data from the mid-1970s to mid-1980s found that for every 100 husbands who killed their wives in the United States, about 75 women killed their husbands indicating a 3:4 ratio of mariticide to uxoricide.

== English common law ==
Under English common law it was a petty treason until 1828, and until it was altered under the Treason Act 1790 the punishment was to be strangled and burnt at the stake.

== Nineteenth-century conceptualization ==
Although the word is attested earlier as a learned borrowing, it acquired a distinct analytical sense in 1828, when the English novelist James Henry Lawrence (1773–1840) used it as the title of a chapter in his collection The Etonian out of Bounds; or, Poetry and Prose. Lawrence, the author of the matrilineal utopia The Empire of the Nairs, had argued since 1793 for the abolition of marriage itself.

Drawing on the French and English press, Lawrence compiled lists of spouses killed by their partners between 1819 and 1826, tabulating wives and husbands in separate columns — a gendered breakdown that, according to the historian Anne Verjus, no contemporary attempted. His count came to 45 wives and 26 husbands. Extending his reckoning to the suicides of pregnant unmarried women, to infanticide by abandoned single mothers, and to the murder of mistresses by men unwilling to marry them, he concluded that two thirds of all murders committed in England arose from the "false system of legislation" that was indissoluble marriage, and contrasted this with Protestant Germany, where divorce was permitted and where, he wrote, "I never heard of a husband or wife executed for mariticide".

Lawrence never defined the word, and used it against its etymology, covering both spouses rather than husbands alone. The significance of his usage lies elsewhere: by applying the term to a series of crimes rather than to a kind of crime, he shifted the blame from individual immorality or passion to the institution of marriage itself, which Verjus reads as an early attempt at a social science of marital death.

The term circulated in France in the 1830s among Saint-Simonian circles and advocates of restoring divorce, which had been abolished in 1816; Flora Tristan invoked Lawrence's argument in a petition to the Chamber of Deputies signed in December 1837. It fell out of use once divorce was legalized — in 1857 in England and 1884 in France. Historians of femicide have since contrasted Lawrence's notion with the later concept: where femicide names the killing of a woman because she is a woman, Lawrence's mariticide names the killing of a spouse because they are a spouse, and is blind to the gender asymmetry visible in his own figures. He read the preponderance of murderous husbands not as evidence of male violence but as a consequence of descent: a wife is certain that her children are her own, whereas a husband may have to support "his wife's spurious brood at home, and his own illegitimate offspring abroad", so that marriage is favourable to women "in one respect, and one only". Since on his reasoning those who kill are those with most to gain from escaping an indissoluble union, husbands kill more often — not because they are unhappier in marriage, but because they can never be sure of their line of succession. Verjus notes that he nowhere connects the appropriation of women through marriage, which he denounces elsewhere, with the licence some husbands take to kill.

== Notable instances ==
=== Historical ===
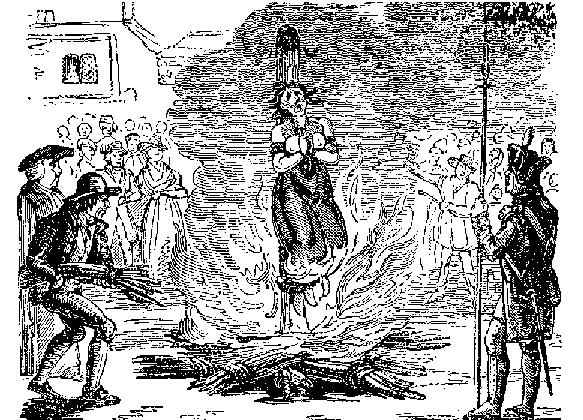
Anne Williams burned at the stake for mariticide in Gloucester, 1753

- Laodice I allegedly poisoned her husband Antiochus II Theos of the Seleucid dynasty around 246 BC.
- Livilla, along with her lover Sejanus, probably poisoned her husband Drusus the Younger.
- The Roman emperor Claudius was allegedly poisoned by his wife Agrippina the Younger to ensure the succession of her son Nero.
- Jean Kincaid (1579–1600) was a Scottish woman who was convicted of mariticide. Her youth and beauty were dwelt upon in numerous popular ballads, which are to be found in Jamieson's, Kinloch's, and Buchan's collections.
- Mary Hobry (1688), decapitated her abusive husband in London.
- Mary Channing (1706), a Dorset woman who poisoned her husband to be with her lover.
- Marie-Josephte Corriveau, 1763, New France
- The Black Widows of Liverpool, Catherine Flannigan (1829–1884) and Margaret Higgins (1843–1884) were Irish sisters who were hanged at Kirkdale Gaol in Liverpool, for the murder of Thomas Higgins, Margaret's husband.
- Rebecca Copin (1796–1881) attempted to murder her husband in Virginia by putting arsenic in his coffee. While the jury agreed that she attempted mariticide in 1835, they did not grant her husband a divorce.
- Florence Maybrick (1862–1941) spent fourteen years in prison in England after being convicted of murdering her considerably older English husband, James Maybrick, in 1889.
- Tillie Klimek claimed to have psychic powers by predicting her husbands' deaths in Chicago, but was proven after the attempted murder of her fifth husband that she was poisoning them with arsenic.
- Edith Thompson and Frederick Bywaters were executed in 1923 for the murder of Thompson's husband Percy in London.
- Annie Walsh became the last woman to be executed in Ireland, in 1925, having murdered her husband.
- Betty Broderick shot and killed her ex-husband, Daniel, and his new wife, Linda, in 1989 while they were sleeping in their home in the United States.
- Heather Osland drugged and had her son kill her husband in 1991, creating a test case for the battered woman syndrome defense in Australia.
- Katherine Knight (b. 1955) murdered her de facto husband in October 2001 in Australia by stabbing him, then skinned him and attempted to feed pieces of his body to his children. She was sentenced to life in prison without parole: her appeal against this sentence as too harsh was rejected.
- Sheila Garvie, convicted in 1968 of the murder of Maxwell Garvie, her husband, in Scotland.
- In 1983, musician Felix Pappalardi was shot and killed by his wife Gail Collins Pappalardi in the United States.
- In 1991, Pamela Smart had her husband murdered by a student of hers in New Hampshire. Though the student committed the murder, the courts ruled that Smart had been guilty of mariticide due to her influence on the young man and her convincing manner to get him to carry out the act.
- In 1998, entertainer Phil Hartman was killed by his wife Brynn Hartman, who then killed herself in Los Angeles.
- In 1998, 81-year-old Gabriel Kisch was murdered by his wife who roasted his head in the oven before throwing his body parts into the water in central Stockholm.
- In 1999, Celeste Beard persuaded her lover to kill her wealthy husband Steven.
- In 2000, Denise Williams conspired with her lover, Brian Winchester, to kill her husband, Mike Williams. She collected a $2 million insurance payment Winchester had arranged for the couple and then later married him. After they divorced several years later, Winchester, following his arrest after an incident where he sneaked into her car and held her at gunpoint, told police where the body had been buried; the information led to Williams' conviction in 2018.
- In 2002, David Lynn Harris was run over multiple times by a car. The perpetrator was his wife, Clara, killed him by running him over with a car in a parking lot. She was released from prison after serving fifteen years of her twenty year sentence.
- In 2003, Susan Wright tied her husband, Jeff, to a bed and stabbed him multiple times with two different knives in Texas.
- In 2004, Jamila M'Barek paid her brother to murder her husband, Anthony Ashley-Cooper, 10th Earl of Shaftesbury.
- In 2004, Melanie McGuire murdered her husband, William, then desecrated his body.
- Mary Winkler (born 1973) was convicted of voluntary manslaughter in the 2006 shooting of her husband, Matthew Winkler (1974–2006), a minister, in Tennessee.
- Manling Williams (1979), murdered her husband Neal Williams and their two children, due to her wanting to start a new life without them. She is convicted of the crime and sentenced to death.
- Travis Alexander (1977–2008) was an American salesman who was murdered by his ex-girlfriend, Jodi Ann Arias (born 1980), in his house in Mesa, Arizona. Arias was convicted of first-degree murder in 2013 and was sentenced to life in prison without the possibility of parole in 2015.
- In 2008, Chilean architect María del Pilar Pérez hired a hitman to kill her husband along with two other people. She was sentenced to life in prison.
- In 2009, Dale Harrell was murdered by his wife Marissa-Suzanne DeVault in Arizona. She was sentenced to life in prison.
- In 2012, Susana Freydoz shot and killed her husband Carlos Soria, the recently inaugurated Governor of Río Negro Province, Argentina. She was sentenced to 18 years in prison and paroled in 2023.
- In 2018, Daniel Brophy was killed by his wife Nancy Crampton-Brophy in Portland, Oregon; she was later sentenced to life in prison at the Coffee Creek Correctional Facility.

=== Mythological ===
In Greek mythology

- Clytemnestra murders her husband Agamemnon as an act of vengeance for the sacrifice of their daughter Iphigeneia, and to retain power after his return from Troy. In Aeschylus' Oresteia, the Erinyes consider Orestes' matricide a greater crime than Clytemnestra's mariticide, since the killing of a spouse does not shed familial blood, but the opposite view is espoused by Aeschylus's Athena.
- The Danaïdes were 50 sisters who were forced into marriage. All but one murdered their husbands on their wedding night.

In Chinese literature

- Pan Jinlian poisons her husband with arsenic in both the Water Margin and its spin-off Jin Ping Mei.

== See also ==
- Avunculicide, the killing of one's uncle
- Filicide, the killing of one's child
- Fratricide, the killing of one's brother
- Uxoricide, the killing of one's wife
- Matricide, the killing of one's mother
- Nepoticide, the killing of one's nephew
- Parricide, the killing of one's parents or another close relative
- Patricide, the killing of one's father
- Prolicide, the killing of one's offspring
- Sororicide, the killing of one's sister
- Intimate partner violence
- James Henry Lawrence
