= Home Invasion (film) =

- Directed by: David Tennant
- Written by: Peter Sullivan
- Produced by: Jeff Sackman; Kirk Shaw; Shawn Ashmore; Matt Drake
- Starring: Jason Patric; Scott Adkins; Natasha Henstridge; William Dickinson; Kyra Zagorsky; Michael Rogers
- Cinematography: Toby Gorman
- Edited by: Asim Nuraney
- Music by: Robert Smart
- Production company: Odyssey Media
- Release date: February 2, 2016 (United States)
- Running time: 85 minutes
- Country: United States
- Language: English

Home Invasion is a 2016 American thriller film, directed by David Tennant. It stars Jason Patric, Scott Adkins, Natasha Henstridge, William Dickinson, Kyra Zagorsky and Michael Rogers.

== Cast ==
- Natasha Henstridge as Chloe
- Jason Patric as Mike
- Kyra Zagorsky as Knox
- Liam Dickinson as Jacob
- Michael Rogers as Astor
- Christian Tessier as Xander
- Brenda M. Crichlow as Bess
- Scott Adkins as Heflin

== Plot ==
An attractive woman, Chloe, lives with her stepson Jacob in a luxury mansion on an isolated peninsula, only accessible from the mainland by a swing bridge. One evening, while entertaining a friend, Alice, she admits she has no idea where her rich husband is or what he is doing. He has not replied to messages for days. Three strangers, two men and a woman stop their car outside, claiming to be lost. Alice goes outside to help them but is shot and killed. They force themselves into the house while Chloe and Jacob hide. She raises the alarm with their private security company, who watch every room with hidden cameras. The gang search the house with metal detectors, looking for a secret safe. Meanwhile, a fourth member sabotages the swing bridge to hold back the police.

The woman gang member, Knox, finds Chloe and Jacob, but they overpower her and tie her up until she is later found and released. The bridge is finally opened, and the police drive to the house but are blocked by the fourth gang member. He is killed in a gunfight with the police, in which the sheriff and several deputies are also killed. Meanwhile, the gang finds the hidden safe but cannot open it. Chloe is captured and the gang leader, Heflin, kills the failed safecracker to intimidate her into revealing the combination. He tells her he has killed her husband as they were both criminals and he had stolen something of great value that is in the safe.

She has no idea what the combination is, but stabs Heflin, in the leg. She and Jacob escape again. Outside, Jacob climbs into a SUV and hits and kills Knox. The security company play a recording of Chloe’s voice through a speaker to lure Heflin the wrong way. Chloe kills him with her husband’s gun.

The final image is the still unopened safe with police evidence markers around it.

== Release ==
The film had its world premiere on February 2, 2016.

== See also ==
- List of films featuring home invasions
