= Kyra Zagorsky =

American actress

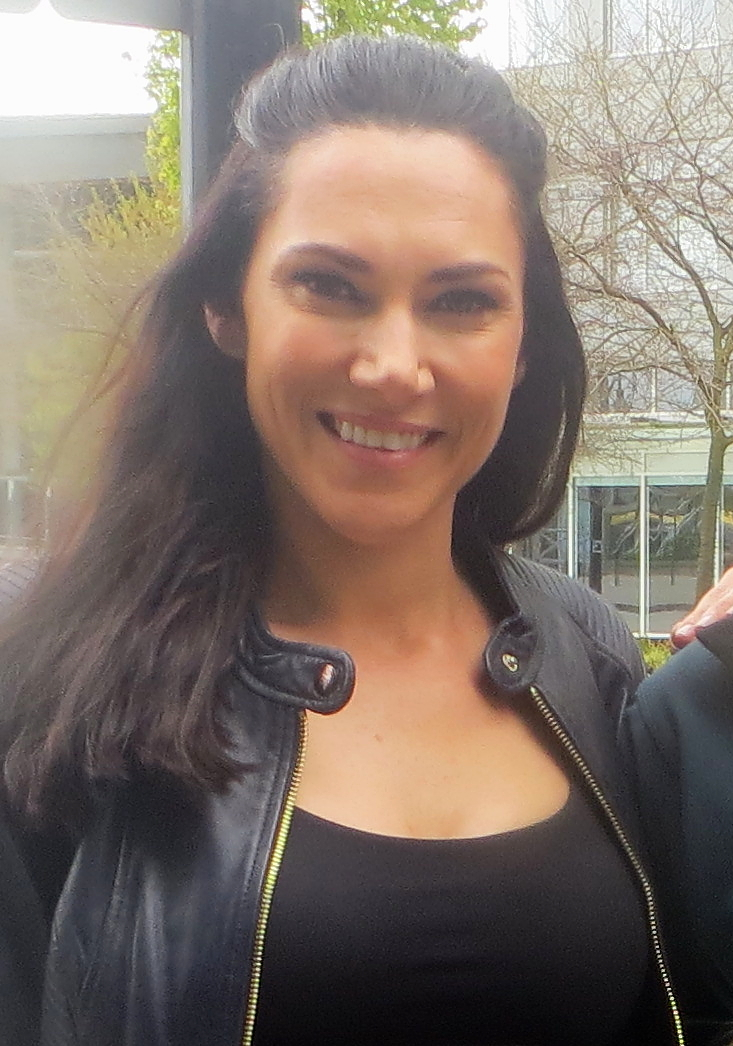
- Zagorsky in 2015
- Born: June 6, 1976 (age 50); New York, United States
- Education: Southern Oregon Univ. (BFA); UC Irvine (MFA 2006)
- Occupation: Actress
- Years active: 2004–present
- Spouse: Patrick Sabongui (m. 2002)
- Children: 2

Kyra Zagorsky (born June 6, 1976) is an American film and television actress. She has acted in the TV series Helix, the film The Pastor's Wife and season eight of the TV series Supernatural.

== Early life ==
Zagorsky was born in New York and raised in the mountains in a small town in Colorado. She grew up in the outdoors, and was an athlete and dancer throughout school. She began acting in her senior year of high school, when she auditioned for the school musical and was cast as one of the leads.

Zagorsky went on to receive a bachelor of fine arts in theatre from Southern Oregon University in Ashland. In 2006, she earned a master of fine arts degree in acting from the University of California, Irvine.

== Career ==
Zagorsky's most notable role was Dr. Julia Walker in Helix. She had guest-star appearances in SyFy's Continuum in its final season, as well as Stargate: Atlantis and Stargate Universe, The CW's Supernatural, FOX's Fringe, TNT's Falling Skies and in the award-winning web series Divine. Zagorsky took on a lead role in the film The ABCs of Death, "a 26-chapter anthology that showcases death in all its vicious wonder and brutal beauty", which premiered at the 2012 Toronto International Film Festival and in the zombie horror film Toxin 3D.

== Personal life ==
Zagorsky married Canadian actor Patrick Sabongui in 2002. They have a son and a daughter.

== Filmography ==
=== Film ===
Year	Title	Role	Notes
2004	Power Corps	Trish	Movie
2006	Green Season	Amy	Short
2012	The Vessel	Dr. Lee	Short
2012	The ABCs of Death	Lainey	Movie
2012	The Closet	Woman	Short
2012	Chained	Athena	Short
2014	Toxin	Carla Frye	Movie
2015	Vendetta	Jocelyn	Movie
2016	Home Invasion	Victoria Knox	Video
2016	Sidekick	Dr. Wallstead	Short
2017	S.W.A.T.: Under Siege	Sophia Gutierrez	Movie
2020	Broil	Mickey Vekks	Movie

=== Television ===
Year	Title	Role	Notes
2007	Stargate Atlantis	Ara	Guest role; 1 episode
2010	The Troop	Bianca Stonehouse	Guest role; 1 episode
2010	Fringe	Nurse	Guest role; 1 episode
2010	Smallville	Kandorian	Guest role; 2 episodes
2010	A Family Thanksgiving	Megan	Television movie
2011	The Pastor's Wife	Tara Bayless	Television movie
2011	Hunt for the I-5 Killer	Pregnant Woman	Television movie
2011	Stargate Universe	Tasia	Guest role; 1 episode
2011	Divine the Series	Beautiful Young Woman	Guest role; 1 episode
2012	Falling Skies	Bonnie	Guest role; 1 episode
2012	Supernatural	Randa Moreno	Guest role; 1 episode
2012–2013	Soldiers of the Apocalypse	Victoria Spade	Guest role; 3 episodes
2013	Twist of Faith	Ruth Fisher	Television movie
2013	Motive	Ronnie Chase	Guest role; 1 episode
2014	Polaris	Marta	Main role; 3 episodes
2014–2015	Helix	Dr. Julia Walker	Main role; 26 episodes
2015	My Life as a Dead Girl	Detective Whalen	Television movie
2015	Continuum	Vasquez	Guest role; 5 episodes
2016	Ice	Regina McCaffrey	Guest role; 2 episodes
2016	Travelers	Dr. Delaney	Guest role; 2 episodes
2017	Yellow	Wife	Television movie (post-production)
2018–2019	Arrow	Athena	Guest role; 2 episodes
2018	The 100	Kara Cooper	Recurring role
2019	See	Delia	Guest role; 1 episode
2022	The Imperfects	Isabel Finch	Main role
2023	Creepshow	Sarah	Episode: "George Romero in 3-D!"

=== Staff credits ===
Year	Title	Staff	Notes
2012	Shakey's Coffee	Producer	Short
2012	Chained	Executive producer	Short
2012	Chained	Writer	Short
2017	The Prince	Writer	Short
2017	The Prince	Director	Short
