= Drone (2017 film) =

- Theatrical release poster
- Directed by: Jason Bourque
- Screenplay by: Paul A. Birkett; Jason Bourque
- Story by: Paul A. Birkett; Roger Patterson; Jason Bourque
- Produced by: Sefton Fincham; Ken Frith
- Starring: Sean Bean; Patrick Sabongui; Joel David Moore; Mary McCormack
- Production companies: Look to the Sky Films; Gold Star Productions; Daylight Media; Pacific Northwest Pictures
- Distributed by: Screen Media Films
- Release dates: April 17, 2017 (Vancouver premiere); May 26, 2017
- Running time: 89 minutes
- Country: Canada
- Language: English

Drone is a 2017 Canadian thriller film starring Sean Bean as an American drone pilot who is confronted by a Pakistani businessman in his hometown. The film, directed by Jason Bourque, premiered at the 2017 Vancouver International Film Festival in April and was released in theaters in the United States on May 26, 2017.

== Plot ==
In March 2016, a drone strike in Pakistan kills the intended target but it also results in collateral damage, taking the lives of several innocents who found themselves at the wrong place at the wrong time.

One year later, on the anniversary of the drone strike, Imir Shaw finds himself at the home of Neil Wistin, a contract drone operator for the CIA. Wistin and his family, particularly his distant son, are dealing with the loss of Wistin's father, for whom Wistin is struggling to write a eulogy. While Wistin goes off to pack the rest of his father's belongings up from a home for the elderly, Wistin's wife, Ellen, is followed by Shaw. Shaw captures incriminating images of Ellen engaging in an affair with another man. Shortly thereafter, near a park, Shaw himself evades the capture of a trailing man.

Breaking down in grief after packing the last of his father's belongings and donating his clothes, Wistin returns home. While home, Wistin catches Shaw standing outside of his home and goes out to investigate. Shaw claims to be interested in buying a boat Wistin had displayed in the front of his home for sale. The boat was Wistin's father's that he was given when his father could no longer care for it. The two enter Wistin's home to discuss the price of the boat while the CIA track down Shaw as the source of a leak that privately exposed Wistin and the top secret work he and others do as contract drone operators.

While having dinner with the Wistins, it is revealed through dinner table conversation that it is the one-year anniversary of the death of Shaw's wife and daughter at the hands of a drone operator—who is implicitly implied to have been Wistin. Receiving a call, Wistin excuses himself to his office, where he learns of the leak. Wistin then asks for the details of his work one year prior to the date. This information confirms Wistin's suspicions about who Shaw really is and what he is there for.

Confronting Shaw in private, Wistin makes a motion to call the police. However, Shaw pulls out what is believed to be a bomb detonator, claiming to have a drone missile worth of explosives in the briefcase he brought with him and placed on the kitchen table where Wistin's wife and son are. Shaw threatens to detonate the bomb unless Wistin cooperates with Shaw and reveals to his family what his actual, classified job description is. Wistin complies and then Shaw reveals the affair Wistin's wife is having with another man to him.

The CIA, having tracked Shaw to Wistin's home, surround the house with an armed team and prepare to assassinate Shaw; however, they are blocked from doing so when Wistin and Shaw get into a brawl. Shaw – dropping the detonator – is stabbed several times by Wistin. As Shaw lies dying on the ground, Wistin discovers that there had been no bomb at all and realizes what he has done. Shaw dies and Wistin, a changed man, reveals his top secret work as a contract drone operator for the CIA. Some hail him a hero, while others condemn him a traitor.

== Cast ==
- Sean Bean as Neil Wistin
- Patrick Sabongui as Imir Shaw
- Maxwell Haynes as Shane Wistin
- Mary McCormack as Ellen Wistin
- Joel David Moore as Gary

== Release ==
Drone was released in theaters in the United States on May 26, 2017, as well as on digital platforms.

== Reception ==
=== Critical response ===
Drone holds an approval rating of 27% on review aggregator website Rotten Tomatoes, based on 11 reviews, with an average rating of 4.3/10. On Metacritic, the film holds a score of 49 out of 100, based on 4 critics, indicating "mixed or average reviews".

== See also ==
- List of films featuring drones
