= Jean Kincaid =

Scottish murderer

Jean Kincaid (1579–5 July 1600) was a Scottish woman who was convicted of murdering her husband.

== Biography ==
Jean was the daughter of John Livingstoun of Dunipace, born in 1579 as Jean Livingston. She married John Kincaid of Warriston, who was a man of influence in Edinburgh, being related to the Kincaids of Stirlingshire, and who owned extensive estates in Midlothian and Linlithgowshire. In Early Modern Scotland married women did not adopt their husband's surnames.

Owing to alleged maltreatment, she was said to have conceived a deadly hatred for her husband soon after being married, and a nurse who lived in her house urged her to take revenge. Robert Weir, a servant of her father, and her reputed lover, was admitted by Jean Kincaid into her husband's chamber in his house at Warriston at an early hour on the morning of 1 July 1600, and he gripped John Kincaid tightly around the throat and held him for a long time until he was dead. News of the murder quickly reached Edinburgh, and "the Lady Warristoun", "the fause nourise", and her two "hyred women", were arrested "red-handed". Weir escaped, refusing to allow Jean Kincaid to accompany him in his flight. Roger Aston, a courtier, sent news of the murder to England, mentioning that Weir was the servant who kept Dunipace's horse.

Jean Kincaid and the other prisoners were immediately brought before the magistrates of Edinburgh, and a sentence of death was passed upon them. No official records of the trial are extant. Birrel wrote that:

Scho was tane to the girth-crosse, (Note: "Girth-Crosse—so called from having once stood at the foot of the Cannongate, near the Girth or sanctuary of Holyrood-house" (Kinloch 1827, p. 52).) upon the 5 day of July, and her heid struck fra her bodie, at the Cannagait-fit; quha deit very patiently. Her nurische was brunt at the same tyme, at 4 houres in the morneing, the 5 of July.

According to Calderwood's History of the Kirk of Scotland, "the nurse and ane hyred woman, her complices, were burnt in the Castell Hill of Edinburgh". In the brief interval between the sentence and execution Jean Kincaid was brought, by the efforts of a clergyman, from a state of callous indifference to one of religious resignation. Weir, who was arrested three years afterwards, was broken on a cart wheel next to the Mercat Cross in Edinburgh, on 26 June 1603. The hangman used the coulter of a plough. This was a rare mode of execution in Scotland.

== Legacy ==
A "memorial" of her "conversion…with an account of her carriage at her execution," by an eyewitness, was privately printed at Edinburgh in 1827, from a paper preserved among Wodrow's manuscripts. in the Advocates' Library, by Charles Kirkpatrick Sharpe. The youth and beauty of Mrs. Kincaid were dwelt upon in numerous popular ballads, which are to be found in Jamieson's, Kinloch's, and Buchan's collections. The songs variously ascribe blame to the husband, the wife, or the devil. "The death of Lord Warriston" is a ballad printed by Francis James Child (Child 194); Buchan's version is also in the Oxford Book of Ballads (1969).

== General references ==
- Kinloch, George Ritchie (1827), Ancient Scottish Ballads: recovered from tradition and never before published; with notes, historical and explanatory; and an appendix containing the airs of several of the ballads, Longman, Rees, Orme, Brown & Green, pp. 51, 52
- Maxwell, H. (1916), Edinburgh, London: Williams & Norgate, pp. 302–303

Attribution:

- This article incorporates text from a publication now in the public domain: Stronach, George (1892). "Kincaid, Jean". In Lee, Sidney (ed.). Dictionary of National Biography. Vol. 31. London: Smith, Elder & Co. p. 123.
