= Mike Ripley =

British writer (born 1952)

- Born: Michael David Ripley; 1952 (age 73–74); Huddersfield, Yorkshire, England
- Education: University of East Anglia
- Occupations: Author, critic and archaeologist
- Writing career
- Notable work: The Angel series of comedy thrillers
- Notable awards: Crime Writers' Association "Last Laugh Award"

Mike Ripley (born 1952) is the British author of the award-winning "Angel" series of comedy thrillers as well as a critic and archaeologist.

== Life and work ==
Born Michael David Ripley in Huddersfield, Yorkshire, England, he received a BA honours degree from the University of East Anglia in 1974.

He is the author of the Angel series of comedy thrillers set mainly in Essex and London's East End. He won the Crime Writers' Association "Last Laugh Award" for best humorous crime novel for Angel Touch in 1989 and Angels in Arms in 1991.

He was also a scriptwriter for the fifth series of the BBC comedy-drama Lovejoy (1986–94) starring Ian McShane, and served as The Daily Telegraph's crime fiction critic for ten years. In 2003, at the age of fifty, he suffered a stroke; his 2006 book, Surviving a Stroke, is his autobiographical account of his recovery. After twenty years of working in London he moved to East Anglia and became an archaeologist. In the words of his publisher, "he was thus one of the few crime writers who regularly turned up real bodies".

He currently writes the "Getting Away With Murder" column for the online publication Shots. The inspiration for the column (he once claimed) came after a night of drinking gin with Auberon Waugh and Gore Vidal in London. He is the series editor at Ostara Publishing, which specialises in reprinting classic mysteries and thrillers, and was co-editor of the three Fresh Blood anthologies promoting new British crime writing. He also lectures on crime writing at the University of Cambridge.

In 2007, he was made a patron of the Essex Book Festival and ran his Creative Crime Writing course at the Lavenham Literary Festivals in 2009 and 2013. Working with the Margery Allingham Society he has completed the Albert Campion novel left unfinished on the death of Allingham's widower, Philip Youngman Carter in 1969. Mr. Campion's Farewell was published in April 2014. A second Campion "continuation" novel followed in 2015 and a third in 2016. Ripley has so far published 11 books in the Campion series.

His non-fiction reader's history titled Kiss Kiss, Bang Bang, a survey of the boom in British thrillers 1953–1975, was published in May 2017 and won the H.R.F. Keating Award for non-fiction at Crimefest 2018.

== Continuing Margery Allingham's Campion novels ==
Following the death of the crime writer Margery Allingham in 1966, her husband Philip Youngman Carter completed her novel Cargo of Eagles (published 1968), and two further Campion books: Mr. Campion's Farthing and Mr. Campion's Falcon. Upon Carter's death in 1969, he too left an unfinished manuscript for a Campion novel.

Carter's fragment of manuscript, which contained revisions and minor corrections but no plot outline, character synopsis or plan, was bequeathed to Margery Allingham's sister Joyce; and upon her death in 2001, the manuscript was left to officials of the Margery Allingham Society. It was not until 2012 that Ripley, with the approval and agreement of the Margery Allingham Society, took up the challenge of completing Carter's manuscript, which became Mr. Campion's Farewell.

The novel was published in March 2014 by Severn House Publishers. Since then, Ripley has published additional novels in which Campion continues to age in place. His twelfth book in the series, Mr Campion's Christmas, was published in November 2024 and won his third Last Laugh Award at Crimefest in 2025.

== Bibliography ==
=== Novels ===
==== Fitzroy Maclean Angel series ====
- Just Another Angel (1988)
- Angel Touch (1989)
- Angel Hunt (1990)
- Angels in Arms (1991)
- Angel City (1994)
- Angel Confidential (1995)
- Family of Angels (1996)
- That Angel Look (1997)
- Bootlegged Angel (1999)
- Lights, Camera, Angel (2001)
- Angel Underground (2002)
- Angel on the Inside (2003)
- Angel in the House (2005)
- Angel's Share (2006)
- Angels Unaware (2008)
- Angels and Others (short stories, 2015)

==== Mr. Campion Novels ====
- Mr. Campion's Farewell (after P. Youngman Carter) (2014)
- Mr. Campion's Fox (2015)
- Mr. Campion's Fault (2016)
- Mr. Campion's Abdication (2017)
- Mr. Campion's War (2018)
- Mr. Campion's Visit (2019)
- Mr. Campion's Seance (2020)
- Mr. Campion's Coven (2021)
- Mr. Campion's Wings (2021) ISBN 978-1448306381
- Mr. Campion's Mosaic (2022)
- Mr. Campion's Memory (2023)
- Mr. Campion's Christmas (2024)

==== Non-series novels ====
- Double Take (2002)
- Boudica and the Lost Roman (2005)
- The Legend of Hereward the Wake (2007)
- Buried Above Ground (2025)
- Played To Death (2026)
- Rogue Librarian (2027)

=== Non-fiction ===
- Surviving a Stroke (2006)
- Kiss Kiss, Bang Bang: the boom in British thrillers from Casino Royale to The Eagle Has Landed (2017)
