= John Altman (author) =

American thriller writer

John Altman (born October 8, 1969) is an American thriller writer.

A Harvard graduate, he is the author of eight thrillers. His books have been published in the United States, the United Kingdom, Italy, Japan, Poland, and the Netherlands. In addition to writing fiction, he has worked as a teacher, musician, and freelance writer.

He is a member of International Thriller Writers, the Mystery Writers of America and the International Association of Crime Writers. In 2000 his debut novel A Gathering of Spies was published. His most recent novel is The Korean Woman, published in 2019.

Altman's work has received favourable critical responses, with Booklist describing The Art of the Devil as A must for fans of The Manchurian Candidate, and Publishers Weekly giving Disposable Asset a starred review: This can’t-put-it-down spy thriller from Altman introduces the most deadly and proficient young woman warrior since the Hunger Games’ Katniss Everdeen.

John Altman lives in Princeton, New Jersey with his wife and children.

== Bibliography ==
- A Gathering of Spies (2000)
- A Game of Spies (2002)
- Deception (2003)
- The Watchmen (2004)
- The Art of the Devil (Severn House Publishers, 2014)
- Disposable Asset (Severn House Publishers, 2015)
- False Flag (Blackstone Publishing, 2017)
- The Korean Woman (Blackstone Publishing, 2019)
