= William Rae Wilson =

Scottish lawyer, landowner and travel writer (1772–1849)

William Rae Wilson (1772–1849) was a Scottish lawyer, landowner and travel writer.

== Life ==
Wilson was from a family in Haddington, East Lothian named Rae or Ray, and was born in Paisley on 7 June 1772. His parents were Patrick Ray and his wife Isobel Wilson. He learned law under his uncle, John Wilson of Kelvinbank, town clerk of Glasgow, and for a time practised as a solicitor in the Scottish courts.

His uncle died in 1806, and left him his fortune; and William Rae then, by letters patent, added Wilson to his name. When still young, he had met the Duke of Kent, and found in him a patron. He was presented at court in 1831 to William IV of the United Kingdom by Frederick Augustus Wetherall, comptroller of the household to the Duchess of Kent.

After his first wife's death, Rae Wilson travelled in Egypt and Palestine, and through most of Europe. He became a Fellow of the Society of Antiquaries of London, and in 1844 received the honorary degree of LL.D. from the University of Glasgow.

Rae Wilson died in London, in South Crescent, Bedford Square, on 2 June 1849, and was buried in Glasgow necropolis, where his grave is marked by a conspicuous monument of oriental design. The height is 27 feet (8.2 m), and the stone was "liver-rock" from the Binny quarry near Ecclesmachan.

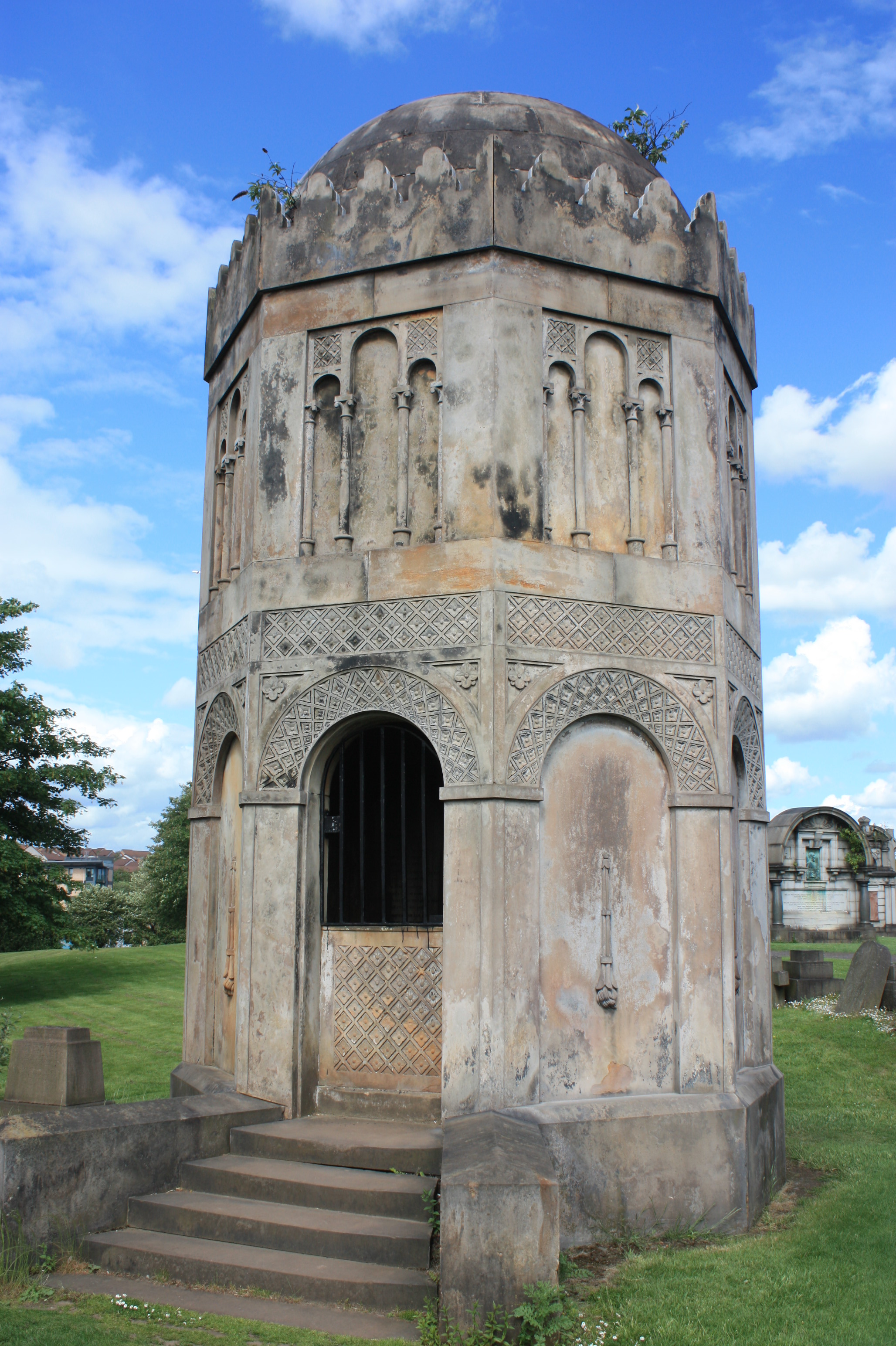
The family mausoleum of William Rae Wilson, Glasgow Necropolis, kiosk design by Jonathan Anderson Bell with the sculptor Alexander McLean

== Works ==
Rae Wilson's publications included:

- Travels in Egypt and the Holy Land, 1823. A popular work, based on the author's travel notes, it went through several editions. The second edition of 1824 was illustrated, after sketches by Rae Wilson and Lady Bell, drawings by A. P. Harrison, engraver I. Clark.
- A Journey through Turkey, Greece, the Ionian Isles, Sicily, Spain, 1824.
- Travels in Norway, Sweden, Denmark, Hanover, Germany, Netherlands, 1826.
- Travels in Russia, 1828, 2 vols.
- Records of a Route through France and Italy; with Sketches of Catholicism, 1835.
- Notes Abroad and Rhapsodies at Home (1837, 2 vols.), as "A Traveller"

== Views and reception ==
A religious man, a writer and a distributor of tracts, Rae Wilson was not of a tolerant spirit. He was described in 1817, after he had visited Rome, as a "zealous friend of our cause" by the British and Foreign School Society.

His sabbatarian views were of his time. Joseph Irving's Book of Scotsmen (1882) commented that "Charitable and hospitable, Rae Wilson's religious views would now be considered narrow and severe [...]". His works included anti-Catholic passages:

In one word, Popery is "of the earth, earthy;"- is revelation so overlaid and disfigured by human conceits and inventions, which, although they cunningly assume the semblance of righteousness, are for the most part quite the reverse of it, as to retain very little indeed of scriptural origin.

John Clubbe wrote that he "glorified the narrowest Protestantism." William Beckford in annotations to the first Travels wrote:

I am rather afraid that reasoning Believers will not find their faith particularly strengthened by the perusal of this volume, which, when it does not repeat what has already been again and again repeated, conveys little if any information at all.

One stricture was answered by Thomas Hood's "Ode to Rae Wilson, Esquire", published in 1837 in the Athenæum. It was described by Thomas Wilson Bayne in the Dictionary of National Biography as "discursive and pungent". Hood already in 1825, in his volume Odes and Addresses to Great People with John Hamilton Reynolds, had written about the Covenanter Mause Headrigg from Old Mortality by Walter Scott:

I like dear Mrs. Headrigg, that unravels
Texts of scripture on a trotting horse—
She is so like Rae Wilson when he travels!

Rae Wilson was further provoked by Hood's "Drinking Song By a Member of a Temperance Society" published in 1836 in the Athenæum. The "Ode", a satire on evangelicalism, was much liked by Charles Dickens, and James Ewing Ritchie felt that in it Hood had "turned the tables" on his evangelical critics generally.

== Family and estate ==
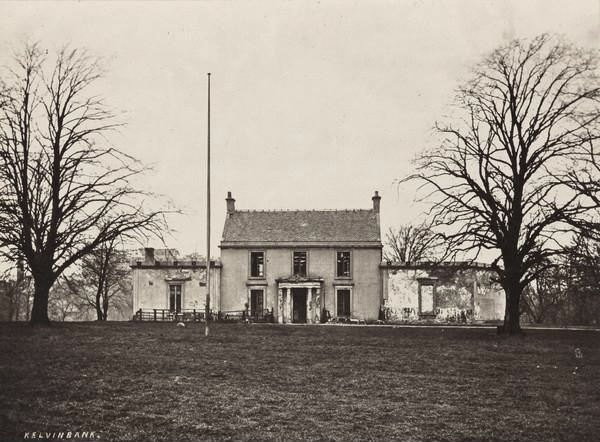
Kelvinbank House in the 1870s, in derelict condition

From his uncle John Wilson, Rae Wilson inherited Kelvinbank House and an estate of 12 Scottish acres. Between Partick to the west and Anderston to the east, it was bounded to the north by the River Kelvin, and by Kelvingrove Street, In 1811 Rae Wilson married Frances Phillips, the invalid daughter of a Glasgow merchant, John Phillips of Stobcross. The Stobcross estate had been bought by Phillips, a sugar refiner in Glasgow, in 1786 from the Watson banking family. It bordered the Kelvinbank estate on the south side, closer to the River Clyde.

Frances was the fourth of at least six daughters. Of her sisters, Elizabeth married in 1805 Robert Coldstream, and was mother of John Coldstream. Margaret married Alexander Smith, and was mother of William Rae Wilson Smith, noted as a reforming Glasgow councillor. Daughter Martha married in 1808 John Reid of Clarendon, Jamaica; Mary married in 1814 Thomas Rowan of Haughhead; and Hannah, the fifth daughter, married A. W. H. Le Neve RN. John Phillips died in 1829 aged 84, and his wife Frances died in 1832, also at age 84.

The death of his wife Frances, 18 months after the marriage, prompted Rae Wilson to write a privately circulated memorial tribute. It was later published in Thomas Gisborne's Christian Female Biography.

Rae Wilson married secondly, in 1820, Ann Cates (1780/81–1864), of Bedford Square, London. She accompanied him in his travels, and after her death was buried in the mausoleum at Glasgow Necropolis. He had no children by either marriage.

In 1846 Rae Wilson sold the Kelvinbank estate. It was acquired, with adjoining property in Sandyford, by the Glasgow Trades' House.

== Legacy ==
In recognition of his honorary doctorate, Rae Wilson left to Glasgow university £300 to provide an annual prize for an essay on Christ and the benefits of Christianity. With money from James Cleland who died in 1840, the Cleland and Rae Wilson Medals were also awarded.
