= Mary Winkler =

American woman (born 1973)

- Born: Mary Carol Freeman; December 10, 1973 (age 52); Guys, Tennessee
- Spouse: Matthew Winkler (m. 1996; mariticide 2006)
- Children: 3
- Conviction: Voluntary manslaughter
- Criminal charges: First-degree murder

Mary Carol Winkler (born December 10, 1973) is an American woman who was convicted of voluntary manslaughter in the 2006 shooting of her husband, Matthew Winkler, the pulpit minister at the Fourth Street Church of Christ in the city of Selmer, Tennessee.

Winkler gained national attention because of public speculation regarding her motives and mental health, allegations of abuse by her husband, her brief flight from the state, and again for the brief length (150 days in jail plus 60 days in a mental health facility) of her sentence. In August 2008, Winkler was granted full custody of her three daughters.

== Criminal case ==
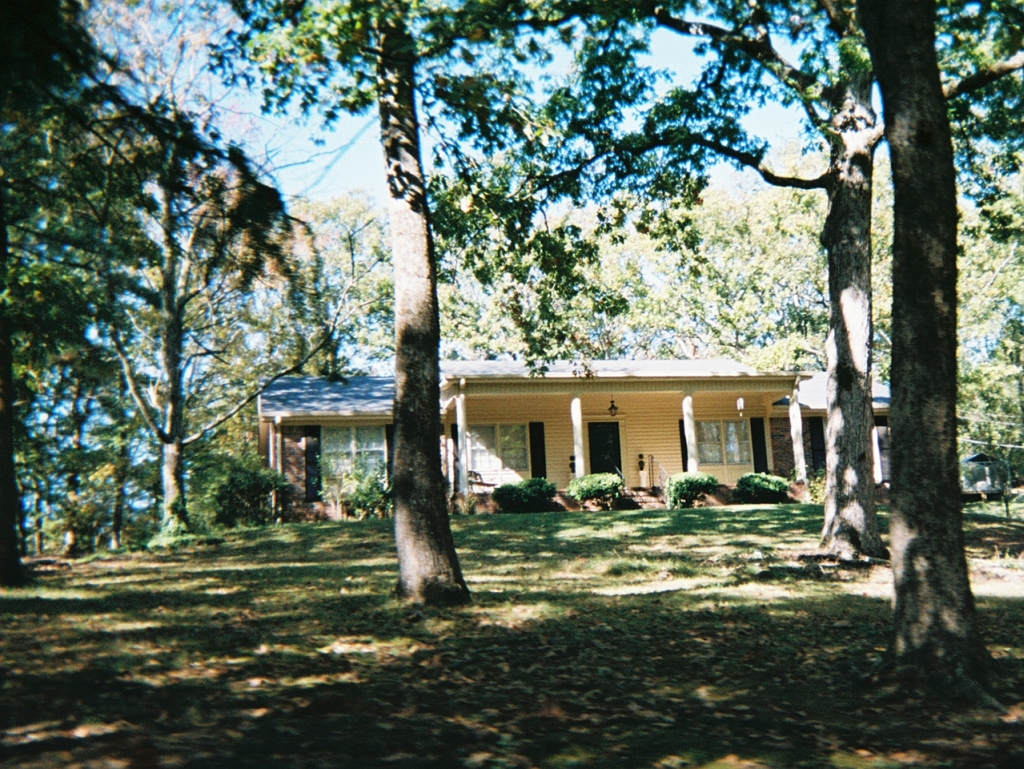
Former Winkler residence in Selmer, Tennessee

According to police, Mary Winkler confessed to the March 22, 2006 fatal shooting of her husband, whose body was discovered in their home by church members after he missed that evening's service. He had been shot in the back with a 12-gauge shotgun.

The couple had been married since 1996. One neighborhood family reported that Matthew Winkler had repeatedly threatened to shoot that family's dog after it strayed onto the Winklers' lawn. Also, other people as well as Mary Winkler's family alleged that Matthew Winkler had been abusive to Mary. Winkler maintained this was the reason for the shooting.

After police issued an Amber alert due to fears of kidnapping, Mary Winkler and the children (Patricia, then 8; Mary Alice, then 6; Breanna, then 1) were discovered in Orange Beach, Alabama. Winkler was placed into custody there and later extradited to the city of Selmer, Tennessee to stand trial. When asked by investigators about what had happened to her husband, Winkler stated that she and her husband had argued about money and offered "I guess that's when my ugly came out." A grand jury indicted Winkler on June 12, 2006, accusing her of first-degree murder.

=== Bond hearing ===
On June 30, 2006, Mary Winkler's bond hearing was held. A Tennessee Bureau of Investigation agent read a statement Winkler gave to authorities in Alabama, where she was arrested a day after her husband's body was found; in it, Winkler says she did not remember getting the gun but she did know her husband kept a shotgun in their home. The next thing she heard was a loud boom. Matthew Winkler was shot in the back as he lay in bed. He rolled from the bed onto the floor, and, still alive, he asked his wife, "Why?" to which she responded, "I'm sorry." When she left the home, Matthew Winkler was still alive in the bedroom, and the phone had been disconnected from its socket. According to the statement, she and her husband had been arguing throughout the evening about many things, including family finances. She admitted some of the problems were "her fault."

Mary had lost money in what her lawyer said was a scam. She had deposited checks that came from "unidentified sources" in Canada and Nigeria into bank accounts belonging to her and her husband. The checks amounted to more than $17,000. Winkler had become caught up in a swindle known as the "Nigerian scam", which promises riches to victims who send money to cover the processing expenses. She added "He had really been on me lately criticizing me for things — the way I walk, I eat, everything. It was just building up to a point. I was tired of it. I guess I got to a point and snapped."

Bond was later set at $750,000, an amount that defense lawyer Steve Farese Sr. claimed was excessive and "tantamount to no bond at all". A plea for reduction of bond was filed and subsequently denied. Winkler's lawyers, Leslie Ballin and Steve Farese Sr., also filed motions to throw out her confession on a technicality, to require prosecutors to state whether or not they would seek the death penalty (they did not), to give potential jurors an extensive questionnaire, and other motions relating to voir dire.

Winkler's entire defense team (her attorneys Steve Farese Sr., Leslie Ballin, Tony Farese, Steve Farese, Jr. and Investigator Terry Cox) represented her pro bono throughout the criminal case.

=== Release from jail on bond ===
Winkler made bond on August 12, 2006 and was set for release from jail. Initially, problems stemming from a 1999 suspension of the bail bond company kept her in jail. However, Winkler was able to post $750,000 bond and was released on August 15, on the stipulation that she live with Rudolf and Kathy Thomsen, friends in McMinnville, Tennessee. The trial commenced on April 9, 2007, with the prosecution resting on April 16. The defense rested two days later.

== Trial ==
On April 18, 2007, Mary Winkler took the stand in her own defense. She told a jury of ten women and two men that her husband often "berated" her and forced her to wear "slutty" costumes for sex. As proof she displayed a pair of high-heeled shoes and a wig at which those in attendance gasped. Winkler claimed that she only shot her husband accidentally. She said that she went to the bedroom closet and retrieved a shotgun because she wanted to force him to work through their problems. "I just wanted him to stop being so mean," she said through tears. Winkler denied she ever actually pulled the trigger, but told the jury "something went off". She heard a boom, then ran from the house because she thought he would be mad at her.

=== Verdict ===
On April 19, 2007, the jury came back with the verdict: guilty of voluntary manslaughter. Prosecutors had asked that Winkler be convicted of first-degree murder, but the jury settled on the lesser charge after deliberating for eight hours.

=== Sentencing ===
The sentencing phase was set to begin on May 18, 2007, but was delayed due to a scheduling conflict by one of the attorneys. On June 8, 2007, a Tennessee judge sentenced Mary Winkler to 210 days in prison for the conviction of voluntary manslaughter. She had credit for already serving five months and the judge permitted her to spend up to 60 days in an undisclosed mental health facility in Tennessee. She was to be put on probation for the rest of her sentence.

== See also ==
- Matthew Winkler (minister)
