= Severn House Publishers =

Independent publishing company

- Parent company: Canongate Books
- Status: Active
- Founded: 1974
- Founder: Edwin Buckhalter
- Country of origin: United Kingdom
- Headquarters location: Surrey
- Distribution: Grantham Book Services (UK); DLS Distribution Services (Australia); Ingram Publisher Services (US)
- Fiction genres: Crime, romance, historical fiction
- Imprints: Severn House, Crème de la Crime
- Official website: http://www.severnhouse.com

Severn House Publishers is an independent publisher of fiction in hardcover and ebooks. Severn House specialises in publishing mid-list authors in both the UK and the USA. Established in 1974, Severn House began republishing out-of-print titles by popular library authors. The publishing house now specialises in providing libraries and the public worldwide with reinforced editions of brand new contemporary fiction, as well as rare or previously unpublished works. Since 2011, Crème de la Crime has been part of Severn House Publishers. In September 2017, Severn House was acquired by Canongate Books.

== Key people ==
- CEO: Jamie Byng
- Publisher: Joanne Grant
- Sales & Operations Director: Michelle Duff

== History ==
Severn House was founded in London in 1974. Originally a publisher of hardback fiction, Severn House now produces titles in all formats, including ebooks and large print. It publishes a broad range of titles, from crime and mystery, through to thrillers, romance, sagas, and historical fiction. While Severn House does occasionally publish debut novelists, the company specialises in series and recognisable, fan-favourite characters from established authors with a strong publication history. Severn House's authors include:

- Rosemary Aitken
- John Altman
- Lin Anderson
- Charles Atkins
- Donald Bain
- Sandra Balzo
- Dorothy Cannell
- Simon Beaufort
- Charles Belfoure
- Lisa Black
- Davis Bunn
- Alys Clare
- Simon Clark (novelist)
- Daniel Depp
- Paul C. Doherty
- Diane Fanning
- Michael Gregorio
- Peter Guttridge
- Bernard Knight
- Barbara Hambly
- Cynthia Harrod-Eagles
- Peter Helton
- Graham Ison
- J. Sydney Jones
- Patricia Macdonald
- Graham Masterton
- R. N. Morris
- Chris Nickson
- Adam Oyenbanji
- Una-Mary Parker
- John Pilkington
- Robert Randisi
- Sarah Rayne
- Mike Ripley
- Pauline Rowson
- Kate Sedley
- Clea Simon
- Stephen Solomita
- Marcia Talley
- Carter Wilson
- David Wishart

In recent years, Severn House's overseas sales have grown rapidly, in part thanks to a continued presence at worldwide book fairs, including its traditional US market, as well as new ventures in the Middle East. Many of Severn House’s authors are featured on blogs and in trade publications worldwide. Severn House books are published in eBook and hardback.

== Crème de la Crime ==
Originally established in 2004, Crème de la Crime, with its distinctive logo and series jacket style, is known for producing accessible British crime fiction, touching upon female sleuths, hardboiled mysteries, and police procedurals that are both light-hearted and extremely dark in tone. Since 2011, Crème de la Crime has been part of Severn House Publishers, specialising in mid-list authors and publishing approximately two books a month. Kate Lyall Grant, formerly of Simon & Schuster, serves as publisher. In 2014 Crème de la Crime had published some of the best-reviewed British crime writers, including:

- Simon Brett
- Paul C. Doherty
- Kate Ellis
- Paul Johnston
- Jim Kelly
- R. N. Morris
- M. J. Trow

== Mike Ripley and Margery Allingham ==
Severn House author Mike Ripley undertook the challenge of completing an unfinished manuscript featuring Albert Campion, the gentleman sleuth created by Golden Age crime writer Margery Allingham. Following Allingham's death in 1966, her husband Philip Youngman Carter completed her novel Cargo of Eagles (published 1968), and two further Campion books: Mr Campion’s Farthing and Mr Campion’s Falcon. Upon Youngman Carter's death in 1969, he too left an unfinished manuscript for a Campion novel.

This fragment of manuscript, which contained revisions and minor corrections but no plot outline, character synopsis or plan, was bequeathed to Margery Allingham’s sister Joyce, and upon her death in 2001, the manuscript was left to officials of the Margery Allingham Society. It was not until 2012 when Mike, with the approval and agreement of the Margery Allingham Society, took up the challenge of completing Youngman Carter's manuscript, which has become Mr Campion's Farewell, and was published in March 2014.

Mr Campion's Farewell has received attention in the national press, and has been featured in The Times, The Spectator, The Independent and The Telegraph.
