= Matthew Winkler (minister) =

American murder victim (1974–2006)

- Born: Matthew Brian Winkler; November 21, 1974; Henderson, Tennessee, U.S.
- Died: March 22, 2006 (aged 31); Selmer, Tennessee, U.S.
- Cause of death: Mariticide
- Body discovered: Selmer, Tennessee
- Spouse: Mary Winkler

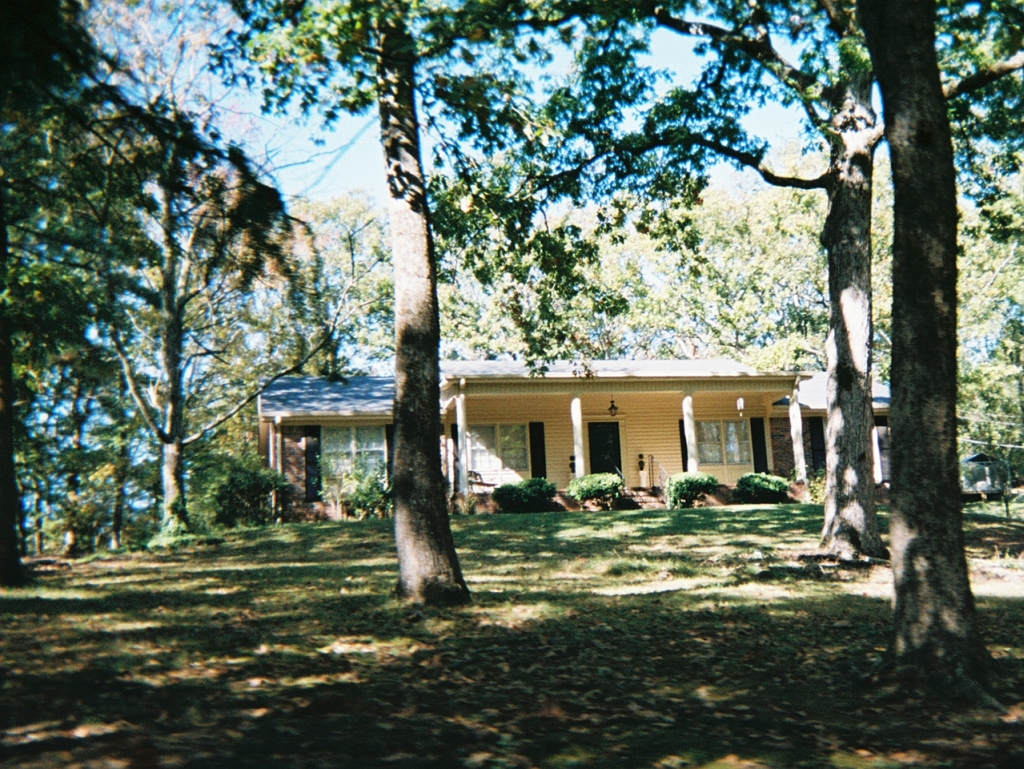
Former Winkler residence in Selmer, Tennessee

Matthew Brian Winkler (November 21, 1974 – March 22, 2006) was a minister who was the victim in a high-profile murder case in 2006.

== Early life ==
Winkler was raised in Woodbury, Tennessee; Huntingdon, Tennessee; and Decatur, Alabama. He attended college at Freed-Hardeman University in Henderson, Tennessee in 1990s and moved to Selmer, Tennessee after he married. He had three daughters named Patricia, then 8; Mary Alice, then 6; Brianna, then 1, whose custody was given to their mother later.

== Death ==
Winkler was serving as the pulpit minister at the Fourth Street Church of Christ in Selmer, Tennessee, at the time of his death. Members of his congregation found him dead inside his home after he failed to appear at the church for a Wednesday-night service he was to lead on March 22, 2006. He had been shot in the back.

== Confession of Mary Winkler ==
Mary Winkler, his wife; and the couple's three small daughters were reported missing along with the family's minivan. The state of Tennessee issued an Amber alert, and Mary and the children were located the next day in Orange Beach, Alabama. Mary confessed to killing her husband and was charged with first-degree murder after extradition to Tennessee. She was released on bond, and her trial began on April 9, 2007.

At trial, Mary claimed that she had suffered extensive physical and emotional abuse at her husband's hands. She was convicted of voluntary manslaughter and sentenced to 150 days in prison plus 60 days in a mental health facility.

== See also ==
- Mary Winkler
