= Free love =

Social movement that accepts all forms of love

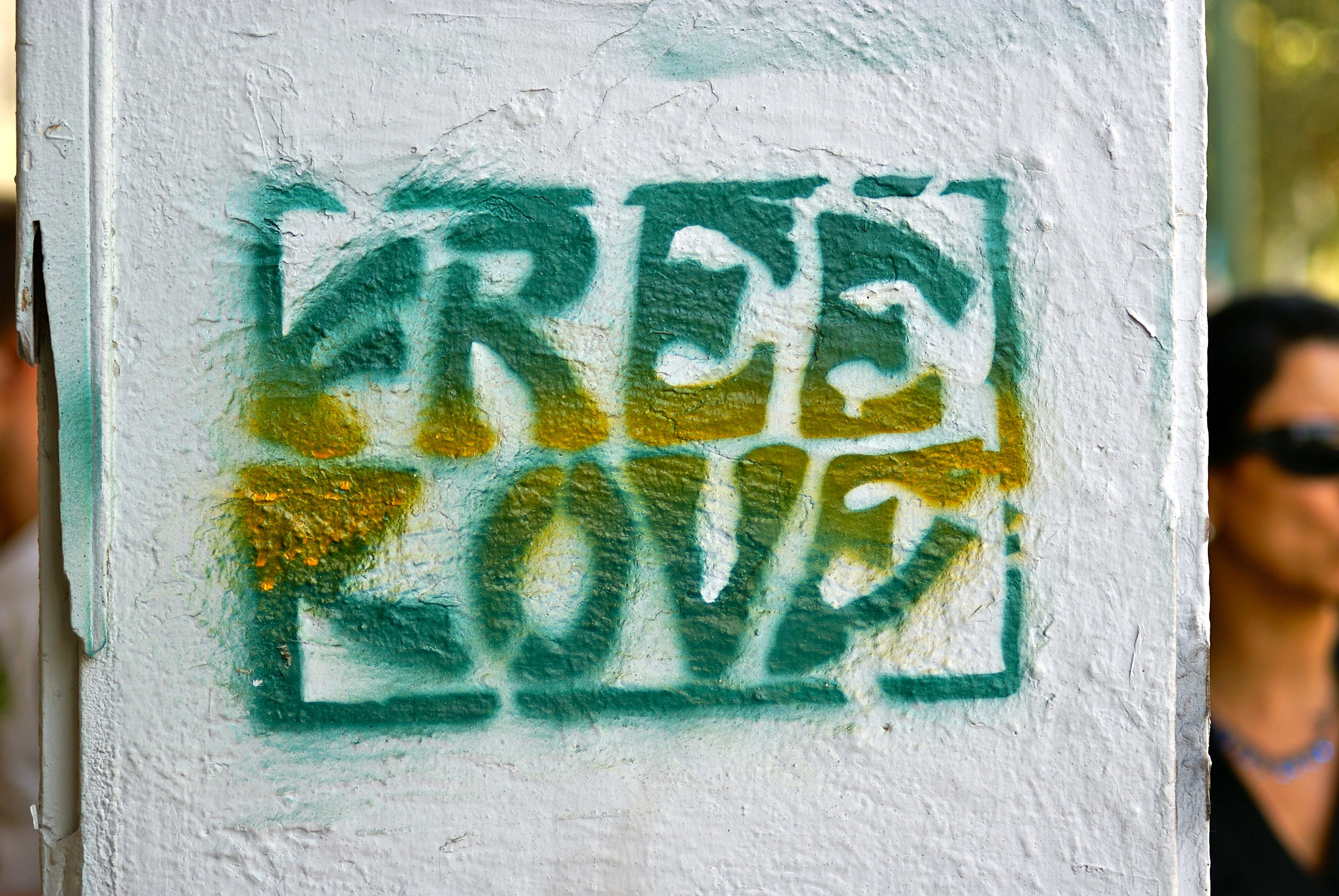
Free Love graffiti

Palm Springs, California during a 1969 spring break festival

Free love is a social movement that accepts all forms of love. The movement's initial goal was to separate the state from sexual and romantic matters such as marriage, birth control, and adultery. It stated that such issues were the concern of the people involved and no one else. The movement began during the 19th century and was advanced by hippies during the 1960s and early 1970s.

The free love movement promoted the idea that consensual sexual and emotional relationships between adults should be free from state and religious interference, emphasizing personal freedom, sexual autonomy, and women’s rights. While intertwined with feminism and advocating for radical social change, the movement was often dominated by male voices and criticized for failing to significantly alter mainstream gender norms.

Throughout history, various utopian and radical movements have embraced the concept of free love as a challenge to conventional marriage and sexual norms. Early examples include the Adamites and Mazdakites, who rejected marriage and promoted communal or free sexual relations. In medieval Europe, sects like the Cathars and Brethren of the Free Spirit were persecuted for their unorthodox beliefs, including critiques of marriage and advocacy for celibacy or free love.

Enlightenment thinkers such as Mary Wollstonecraft and William Blake denounced marriage as oppressive, with Wollstonecraft portraying female sexual autonomy in her novels and personal life, while Blake critiqued religious chastity and advocated passionate love unfettered by law. Romantic poets like Percy Bysshe Shelley and Mary Shelley also embodied free love ideals in their writings and relationships. These ideas continued through the utopian socialism of thinkers like Charles Fourier and Robert Owen, who viewed the suppression of sexual freedom as socially harmful. By the 19th century, figures like Herbert Spencer were arguing for free divorce, reflecting the growing association between free love, feminism, and individual liberty. The Summer of Love in 1967 helped mainstream the Beat Generation’s ideals, fueling a broader counterculture and New Left movement that championed free love, anti-war sentiment, and sexual liberation.

== Principles ==
Much of the free love tradition reflects a liberal philosophy that seeks freedom from state regulation and church interference in personal relationships. According to this concept, the free unions of adults (or persons at or above the age of consent) are legitimate relations which should be respected by all third parties whether they are emotional or sexual relations. In addition, some free love writing has argued that both men and women have the right to sexual pleasure without social or legal restraints. In the Victorian era, this was a radical notion. Later, a new theme developed, linking free love with radical social change and depicting it as a harbinger of a new anti-authoritarian, anti-repressive sensibility.

According to the modern stereotype, earlier middle-class Americans wanted the home to be a place of stability in an uncertain world. To this mentality are attributed strongly defined gender roles, which led to a minority reaction in the form of the free-love movement.

While the phrase free love is often associated with promiscuity in the popular imagination, especially in reference to the counterculture of the 1960s and 1970s, historically, the free-love movement has not advocated multiple sexual partners or short-term sexual relationships. Rather, it has argued that sexual relations that are freely entered into should not be regulated by law, and may be initiated or terminated by the parties involved at will. Nevertheless, it has been acknowledged that many men who participated in the free love movement also saw free love as a way to get free sex.

The term "sex radical" is often used interchangeably with the term "free lover". By whatever name, advocates had two strong beliefs: opposition to the idea of forced sexual activity in a relationship and advocacy for a woman to use her body in any way that she pleases.

Laws of particular concern to free love movements have included those that prevent an unmarried couple from living together, and those that regulate adultery and divorce, as well as age of consent, birth control, homosexuality, abortion, and sometimes prostitution; although not all free-love advocates agree on these issues. The abrogation of individual rights in marriage is also a concern—for example, some jurisdictions do not recognize spousal rape, or they treat it less seriously than non-spousal rape. Free-love movements since the 19th century have also defended the right to publicly discuss sexuality and have battled obscenity laws.

=== Relationship to feminism ===
The history of free love is entwined with the history of feminism. From the late 18th century, leading feminists, such as Mary Wollstonecraft, have challenged the institution of marriage, and many have advocated its abolition.

According to feminist critique, a married woman was solely a wife and mother, denying her the opportunity to pursue other occupations; sometimes this was legislated, as with bans on married women and mothers being employed as teachers. In 1855, free love advocate Mary Gove Nichols (1810–1884) described marriage as the "annihilation of woman", explaining that women were considered to be men's property in law and public sentiment, making it possible for tyrannical men to deprive their wives of all freedom. For example, the law often allowed a husband to beat his wife. Free-love advocates argued that many children were born into unloving marriages out of compulsion, but should instead be the result of choice and affection—yet children born out of wedlock did not have the same rights as children with married parents.

In 1857, in the Social Revolutionist, Minerva Putnam complained that "in the discussion of free love, no woman has attempted to give her views on the subject" and challenged every woman reader to "rise in the dignity of her nature and declare herself free."

The figureheads of the free love movement were often men, both in leading organizations and contributing to its ideology. Almost all books endorsing free love in the 1850s were by men, except for Mary Gove Nichols's 1855 autobiography. This was the first full-length case against marriage written by a woman. Of the four major free-love periodicals in the Reconstruction era, half had woman editors.

To proponents of free love, the act of sex was not just about reproduction. Access to birth control was considered a means to women's independence, and leading birth-control activists also embraced free love. Sexual radicals remained focused on their attempts to uphold a woman's right to control her body and to freely discuss issues such as contraception, marital-sex abuse (emotional and physical), and sexual education. These people believed that by talking about female sexuality, they would help empower women. To help achieve this goal, such radical thinkers relied on the written word, books, pamphlets, and periodicals, and by these means the movement was sustained for over fifty years, spreading the message of free love all over the United States. However, many feminists would point out that the 1960s free love movement did not significantly change views about women's role in mainstream America. Haight-Ashbury Free Clinic founder Dr. David E. Smith, who was a prominent participant in the 1967 Summer of Love, acknowledged in 2007 how many of the men who participated in the event viewed women as prone.

== History ==
=== Early precedents ===
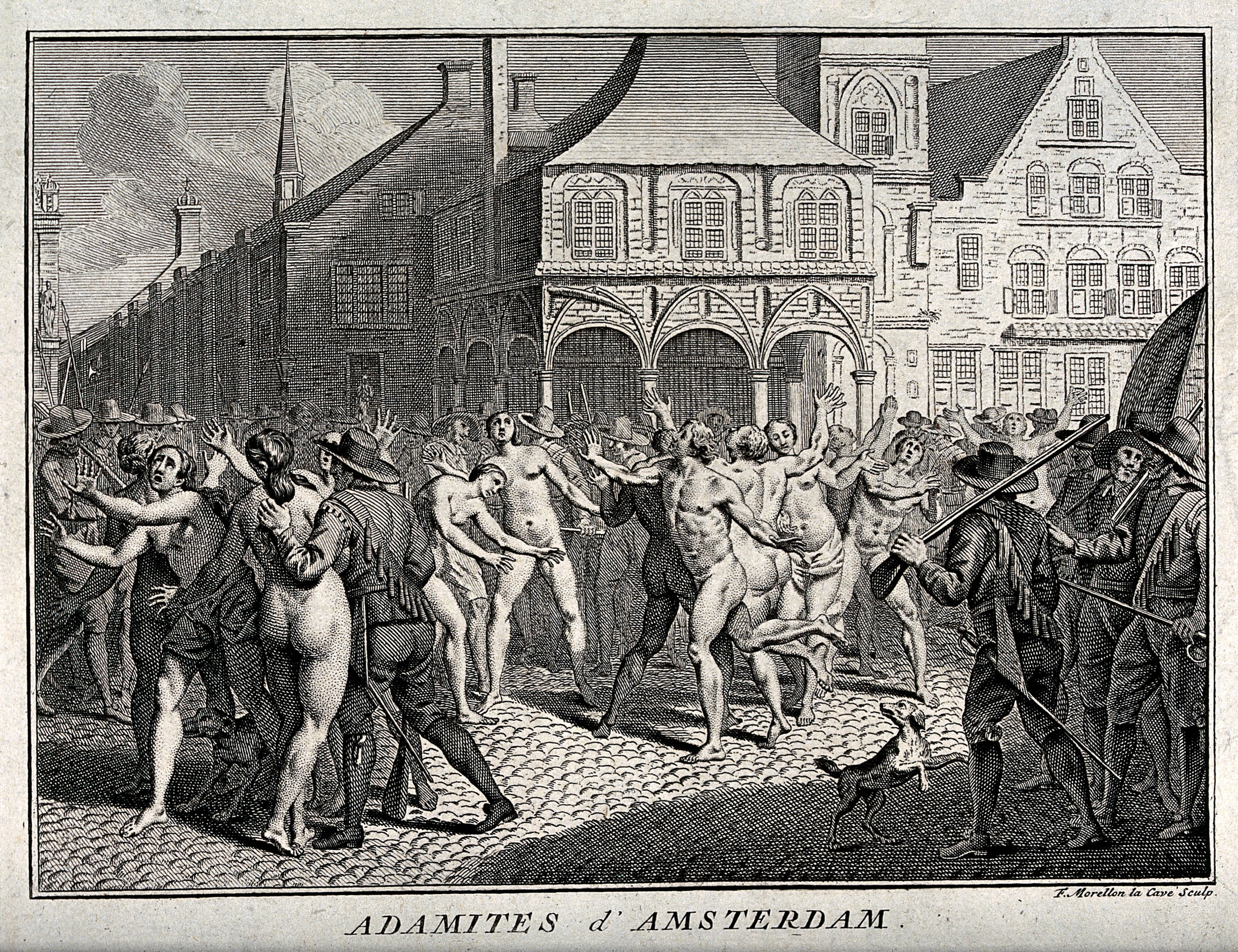
The Adamites were a sect that rejected marriage. Pictured, they are being rounded up for their supposedly heretical views.

A number of utopian social movements throughout history have shared a vision of free love. An early Christian sect known as the Adamites existed in North Africa in the 2nd, 3rd and 4th centuries and rejected marriage. They practiced nudism and believed themselves to be without original sin.

In the 6th century, adherents of Mazdakism in pre-Muslim Persia apparently supported a kind of free love in the place of marriage. One folk story from the period that contains a mention of a free-love (and nudist) community under the sea is "The Tale of Abdullah the Fisherman and Abdullah the Merman" from The Book of One Thousand and One Nights (c. 10th–12th century).

Karl Kautsky, writing in 1895, noted that a number of "communistic" movements throughout the Middle Ages also rejected marriage. Typical of such movements, the Cathars of 10th to 14th century Western Europe freed followers from all moral prohibition and religious obligation, but respected those who lived simply, avoided the taking of human or animal life, and were celibate. Women had an uncommon equality and autonomy, even as religious leaders. The Cathars and similar groups (the Waldenses, Apostle brothers, Beghards and Beguines, Lollards, and Hussites) were branded as heretics by the Roman Catholic Church and suppressed. Other movements shared their critique of marriage but advocated free sexual relations rather than celibacy, such as the Brethren of the Free Spirit, Taborites, and Picards.

Free love was an element in radical thinking during the "English Revolution" of 1640–1660, most strongly associated with the "Ranters". There were also perceptive critiques, within these radical movements, such as by Gerrard Winstanley:

The mother and child begotten in this manner is like to have the worst of it, for the man will be gone and leave them ... after he hath had his pleasure. ..... By seeking their own freedom they embondage others.

=== Enlightenment thought ===
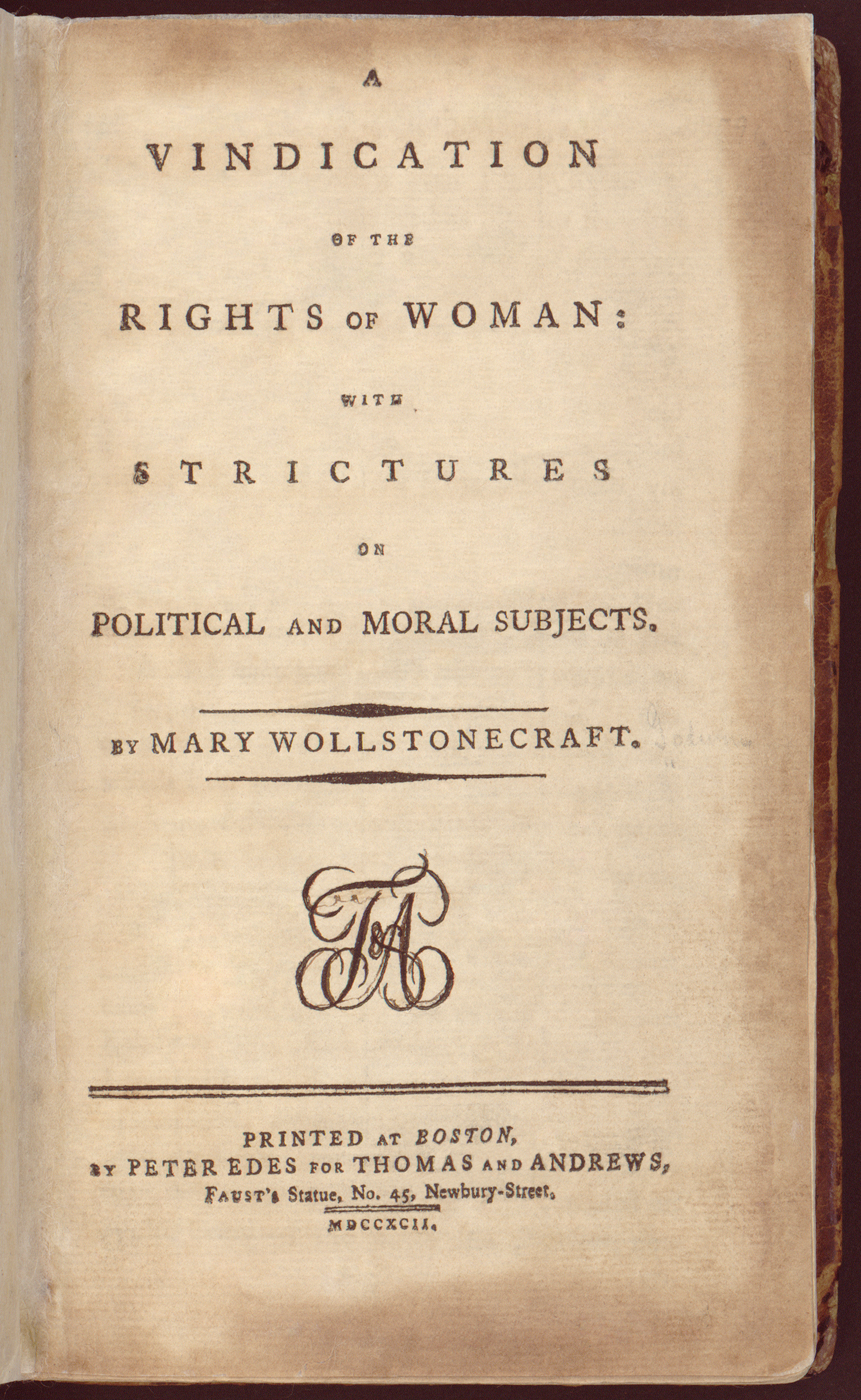
Title page from A Vindication of the Rights of Woman (1792), by Mary Wollstonecraft, an early feminist and proponent of free love.

The ideals of free love found their champion in one of the earliest English feminists, Mary Wollstonecraft. In her writings, Wollstonecraft challenged the institution of marriage, and advocated its abolition. Her novels criticized the social construction of marriage and its effects on women. In her first novel, Mary: A Fiction written in 1788, the heroine is forced into a loveless marriage for economic reasons. She finds love in relationships with another man and a woman. The novel, Maria: or, The Wrongs of Woman, never finished but published in 1798, revolves around the story of a woman imprisoned in an asylum by her husband. Maria finds fulfilment outside of marriage, in an affair with a fellow inmate. Wollstonecraft makes it clear that "women had strong sexual desires and that it was degrading and immoral to pretend otherwise."

Wollstonecraft felt that women should not give up freedom and control of their sexuality, and thus did not marry her partner, Gilbert Imlay, despite the two conceiving and having a child together in the midst of the Terror of the French Revolution. Though the relationship ended badly, due in part to the discovery of Imlay's infidelity, and not least because Imlay abandoned her for good, Wollstonecraft's belief in free love survived. She later developed a relationship with the anarchist William Godwin, who shared her free love ideals, and published on the subject throughout his life. However, the two did decide to marry, just months before her death from complications in parturition.

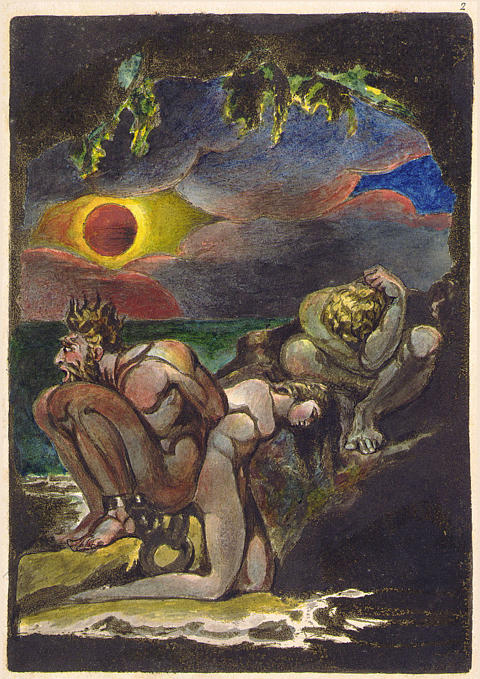
Frontispiece to William Blake's Visions of the Daughters of Albion (1793), which contains Blake's critique of Christian values of marriage. Oothoon (centre) and Bromion (left) are chained together, as Bromion has raped Oothoon and she now carries his baby. Theotormon (right) and Oothoon are in love, but Theotormon is unable to act, considering her polluted, and ties himself into knots of indecision.

A member of Wollstonecraft's circle of notable radical intellectuals in England was the Romantic poet William Blake, who explicitly compared the sexual oppression of marriage to slavery in works such as Visions of the Daughters of Albion (1793), published five years after Wollstonecraft's Mary. Blake was critical of the marriage laws of his day, and generally railed against traditional Christian notions of chastity as a virtue. At a time of tremendous strain in his marriage, in part due to Catherine's apparent inability to bear children, he directly advocated bringing a second wife into the house. His poetry suggests that external demands for marital fidelity reduce love to mere duty rather than authentic affection, and decries jealousy and egotism as a motive for marriage laws. Poems such as "Why should I be bound to thee, O my lovely Myrtle-tree?" and "Earth's Answer" seem to advocate multiple sexual partners. In his poem "London" he speaks of "the Marriage-Hearse" plagued by "the youthful Harlot's curse", the result alternately of false Prudence and/or Harlotry. Visions of the Daughters of Albion is widely (though not universally) read as a tribute to free love since the relationship between Bromion and Oothoon is held together only by laws and not by love. For Blake, law and love are opposed, and he castigates the "frozen marriage-bed". In Visions, Blake writes:

Till she who burns with youth, and knows no fixed lot, is bound
In spells of law to one she loathes? and must she drag the chain
Of life in weary lust? (5.21-3, E49)

Blake believed that humans were "fallen", and that a major impediment to a free love society was corrupt human nature, not merely the intolerance of society and the jealousy of men, but the inauthentic hypocritical nature of human communication. He also seems to have thought that marriage should afford the joy of love, but that in reality it often does not, as a couple's knowledge of being chained often diminishes their joy:

I never was attached to that great sect,
Whose doctrine is, that each one should select
Out of the crowd a mistress or a friend,
And all the rest, though fair and wise, commend
To cold oblivion ...

True love has this, different from gold and clay,
That to divide is not to take away.

In an act understood to support free love, the child of Wollstonecraft and Godwin, Mary, took up with the then still-married English romantic poet Percy Bysshe Shelley in 1814 at the young age of sixteen. Shelley wrote in defence of free love in the prose notes of Queen Mab (1813), in his essay On Love (c. 1815), and in the poem Epipsychidion (1821).

In 1793 James Henry Lawrence published in Wieland's Neuer Teutscher Merkur an essay on the matrilineal system of the Nairs, expanded in 1801 into the novel The Empire of the Nairs; or, the Rights of Women. Where Godwin and Wollstonecraft criticised marriage, Lawrence proposed abolishing it outright. His starting point was that the institution exists to secure men a certain line of descent, and therefore requires that a wife's sexuality be watched: it is marriage itself, and not its abuses, that makes women dependent.

Abolishing it grants women an entire sexual liberty; but that liberty in turn makes paternity unverifiable, and Lawrence drew the consequence that fatherhood must disappear from the law, descent, name and property passing through mothers alone. He added a material condition: without economic independence, sexual liberty would leave a woman at the mercy of her child's putative father. In his system mothers alone own property and the poorest are paid for the burden of children, prostitution disappearing along with the line between honourable and dishonoured women. Percy Bysshe Shelley told him in 1812 that the book had converted him to its doctrines.

=== Utopian socialism ===
Sharing the free-love ideals of the earlier social movements—as well as their feminism, pacifism, and simple communal life—were the utopian socialist communities of early-nineteenth-century France and Britain, associated with writers and thinkers such as Henri de Saint-Simon and Charles Fourier in France, and Robert Owen in England. Fourier, who coined the term feminism, argued for true freedom, without suppressing passions: the suppression of passions is not only destructive to the individual, but to society as a whole. He argued that all sexual expressions should be enjoyed as long as people are not abused, and that "affirming one's difference" can actually enhance social integration.

=== Origins of the movement ===
The eminent sociologist Herbert Spencer argued in his Principles of Sociology for the implementation of free divorce. Claiming that marriage consists of two components, "union by law" and "union by affection", he argued that with the loss of the latter union, legal union should lose all meaning and dissolve automatically, without the legal requirement for a divorce. Free love particularly stressed women's rights since most sexual laws discriminated against women: for example, marriage laws and anti-birth control measures.

==== United States ====
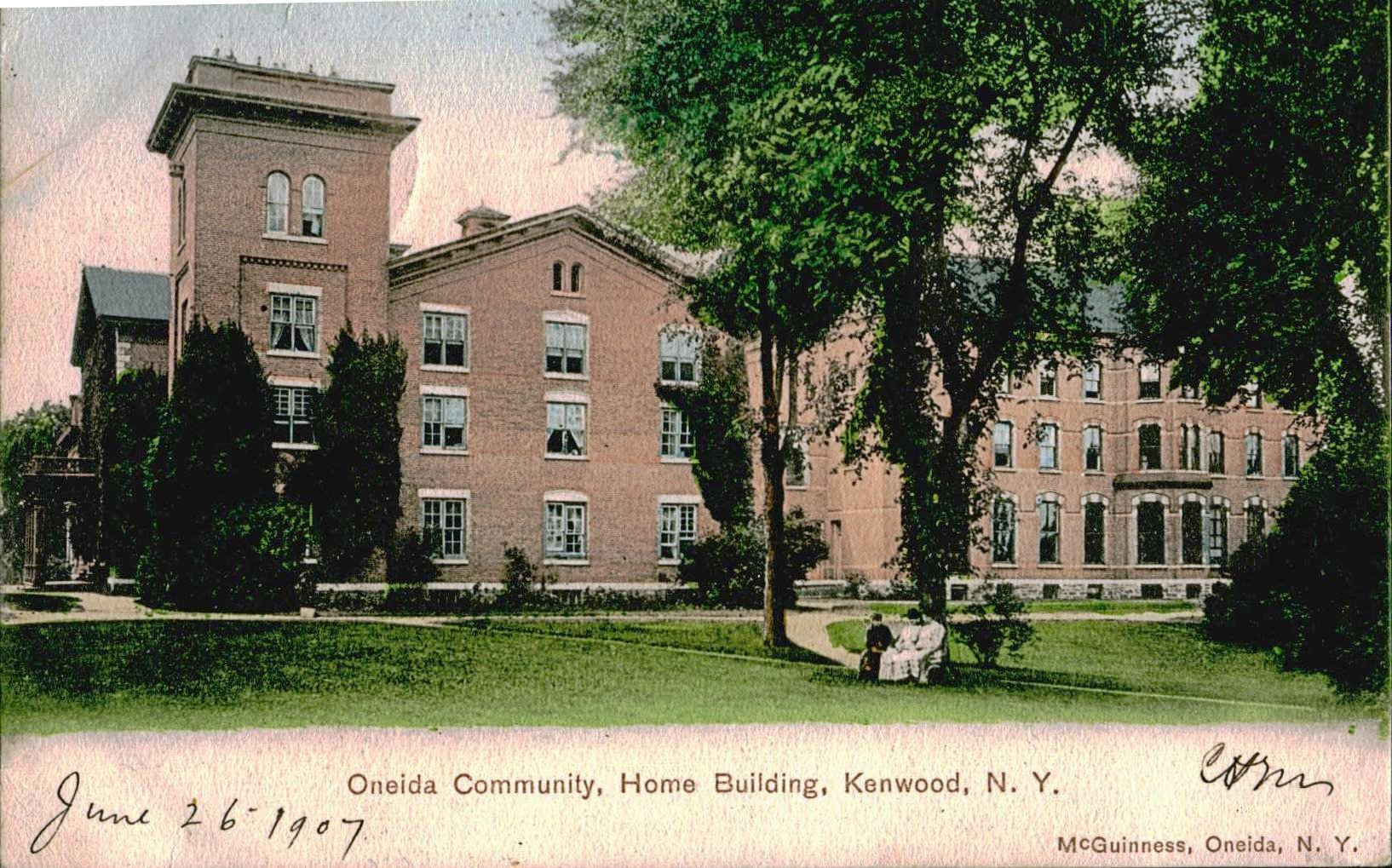
The Oneida Community was a utopian group established in the 1840s, which practiced a form of free love. Postcard of the Oneida Community Mansion House from 1907.

Free love began to coalesce into a movement in the mid- to late 19th century. The term was coined by the Christian socialist writer John Humphrey Noyes, although he preferred to use the term 'complex marriage'. Noyes founded the Oneida Community in 1848, a utopian community that "[rejected] conventional marriage both as a form of legalism from which Christians should be free and as a selfish institution in which men exerted rights of ownership over women". He found scriptural justification: "In the resurrection they neither marry nor are given in marriage, but are like the angels in heaven" (Matt. 22:30). Noyes also supported eugenics; and only certain people (including Noyes himself) were allowed to become parents. Starting in 1837, Theophilus Gates, a precursor to Noyes, founded a short-lived free-love sect known as the "Battle Axes" near Pottstown, Pennsylvania. Another movement was established in Berlin Heights, Ohio.

In 1852, a writer named Marx Edgeworth Lazarus published a tract entitled "Love vs. Marriage pt. 1", in which he portrayed marriage as "incompatible with social harmony and the root cause of mental and physical impairments." Lazarus intertwined his writings with his religious teachings, a factor that made the Christian community more tolerable to the free love idea. Elements of the free-love movement also had links to abolitionist movements, drawing parallels between slavery and "sexual slavery" (marriage), and forming alliances with black activists.

American feminist Victoria Woodhull (1838–1927), the first woman to run for presidency in the U.S., in 1872, was also called "the high priestess of free love". In 1871, Woodhull wrote: "Yes, I am a Free Lover. I have an inalienable, constitutional and natural right to love whom I may, to love as long or as short a period as I can; to change that love every day if I please, and with that right neither you nor any law you can frame have any right to interfere".

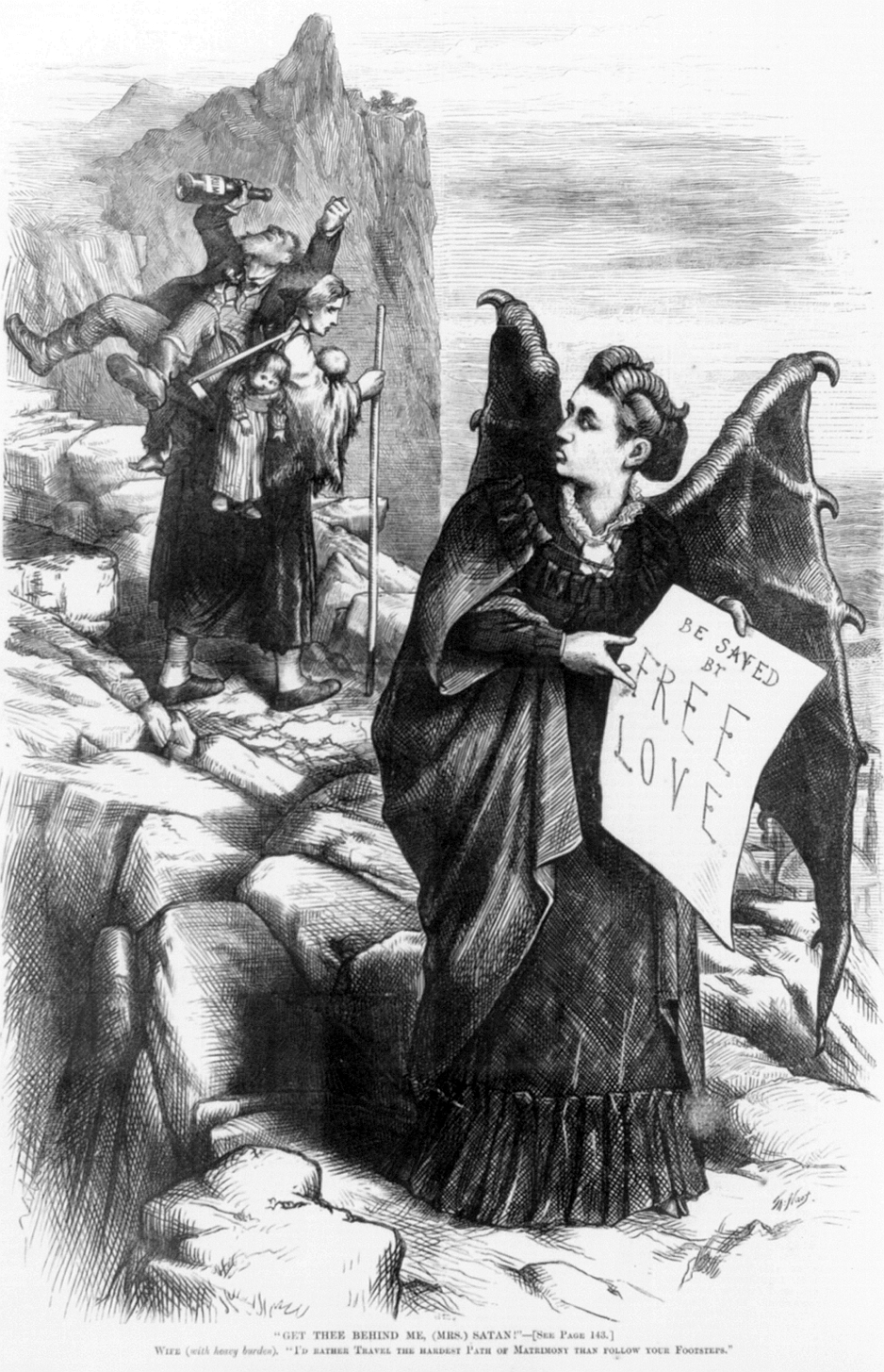
Cartoon by Thomas Nast portraying Victoria Woodhull as an advocate of free love

The women's suffrage movement, free love and Spiritualism were three strongly linked movements at the time, and Woodhull was also a spiritualist leader. Like Noyes, she also supported eugenics. Fellow social reformer and educator Mary Gove Nichols was happily married (to her second husband), and together they published a newspaper and wrote medical books and articles. Both Woodhull and Nichols eventually repudiated free love.

Publications of the movement in the second half of the 19th century included Nichols' Monthly, The Social Revolutionist, Woodhull & Claflin's Weekly (ed. Victoria Woodhull and her sister Tennessee Claflin), The Word (ed. Ezra Heywood), Lucifer, the Light-Bearer (ed. Moses Harman) and the German-language Detroit newspaper Der Arme Teufel (ed. Robert Reitzel). Organisations included the New England Free Love League, founded with the assistance of American libertarian socialist Benjamin Tucker as a spin-off from the New England Labor Reform League (NELRL). A minority of freethinkers also supported free love.

The most radical free love journal was The Social Revolutionist, published in 1856–1857 by John Patterson. The first volume consisted of twenty writers, of which only one was a woman.

Sex radicals were not alone in their fight against marriage ideals. Some other nineteenth-century Americans saw this social institution as flawed, but hesitated to abolish it. Groups such as the Shakers, the Oneida Community, and the Latter-day Saints were wary of the social notion of marriage. These organizations and sex radicals believed that true equality would never exist between the sexes as long as the church and the state continued to work together, worsening the problem of subordination of wives to their husbands.

Free-love movements continued into the early 20th century in bohemian circles in New York's Greenwich Village. A group of Villagers lived free-love ideals and promoted them in the political journal The Masses and its sister publication The Little Review, a literary journal. Incorporating influences from the writings of the English thinkers and activists Edward Carpenter and Havelock Ellis, women such as Emma Goldman campaigned for a range of sexual freedoms, including homosexuality and access to contraception. Other notable figures among the Greenwich-Village scene who have been associated with free love include Edna St. Vincent Millay, Max Eastman, Crystal Eastman, Floyd Dell, Mabel Dodge Luhan, Ida Rauh, Hutchins Hapgood, and Neith Boyce. Dorothy Day also wrote passionately in defense of free love, women's rights, and contraception—but later, after converting to Catholicism, she criticized the sexual revolution of the sixties.

The development of the idea of free love in the United States was also significantly impacted by the publisher of Playboy magazine, Hugh Hefner, whose activities and persona over more than a half century popularized the idea of free love to some of the general public.

However, in spite of the social convention of the day, fornication laws were acknowledged by 1958 to be hardly ever enforced in the United States. In addition, there were also actually fewer states with laws restricting cohabitation for unmarried couples (Mississippi, Michigan, Florida, Arizona, Idaho, Maine, New Mexico, North Carolina, North Dakota, Virginia, and West Virginia) than widely presumed.

==== United Kingdom ====
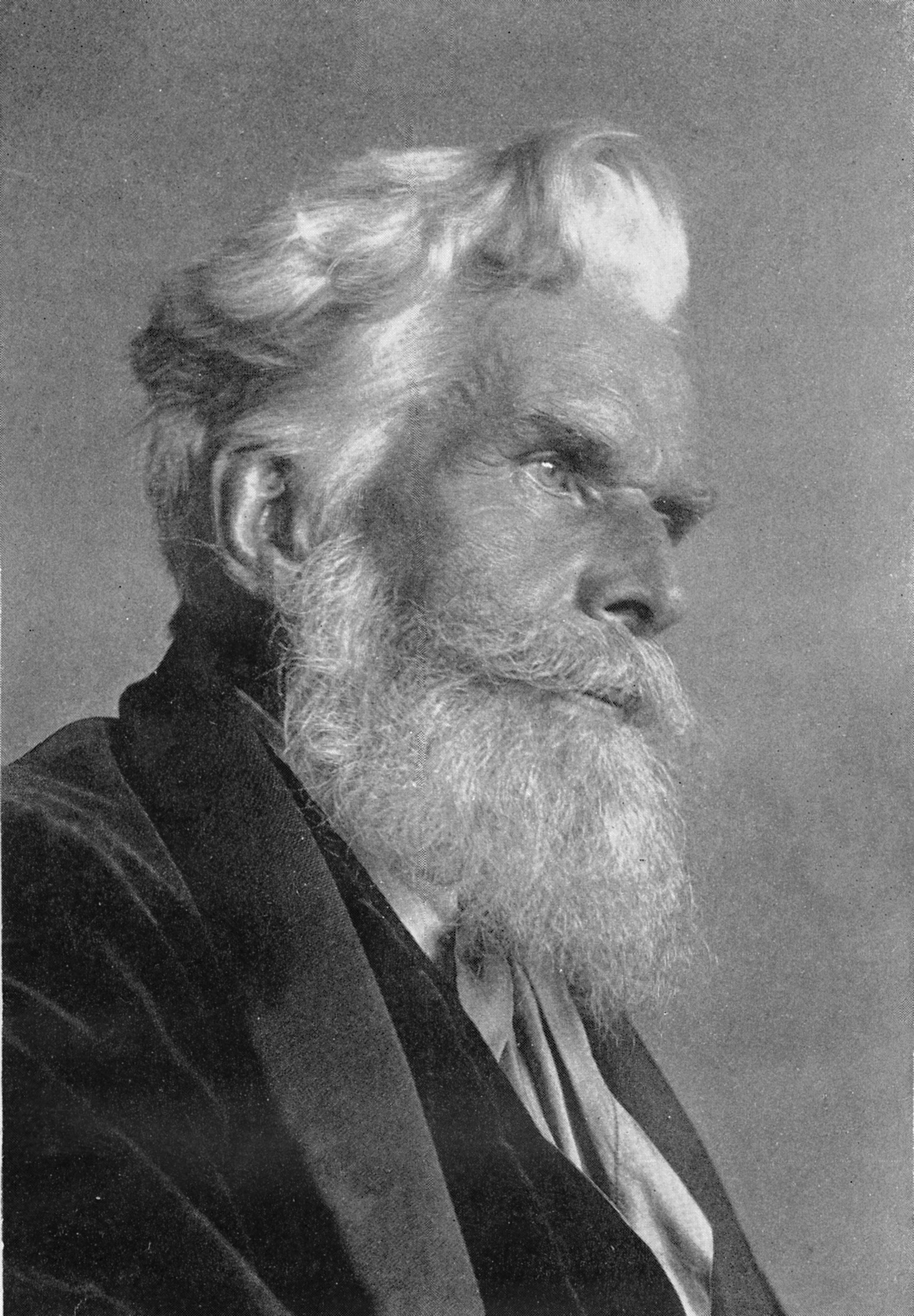
Havelock Ellis was a pioneer sexologist and advocate of free love.

Free love was a central tenet of the philosophy of the Fellowship of the New Life, founded in 1883 by the Scottish intellectual Thomas Davidson. Fellowship members included many illustrious intellectuals of the day, who went on to radically challenge accepted Victorian notions of morality and sexuality, including poets Edward Carpenter and John Davidson, animal rights activist Henry Stephens Salt, sexologist Havelock Ellis, feminists Edith Lees, Emmeline Pankhurst and Annie Besant and writers H. G. Wells, Bernard Shaw, Bertrand Russell and Olive Schreiner. Its objective was "The cultivation of a perfect character in each and all," and believed in the transformation of society through setting an example of clean simplified living for others to follow. Many of the Fellowship's members advocated pacifism, vegetarianism and simple living.

Edward Carpenter was an early activist for the rights of homosexuals. He became interested in progressive education, especially providing information to young people on the topic of sexual education. For Carpenter, sexual education meant forwarding a clear analysis of the ways in which sex and gender were used to oppress women, contained in Carpenter's radical work Love's Coming-of-Age. In it he argued that a just and equal society must promote the sexual and economic freedom of women. The main crux of his analysis centred on the negative effects of the institution of marriage. He regarded marriage in England as both enforced celibacy and a form of prostitution.

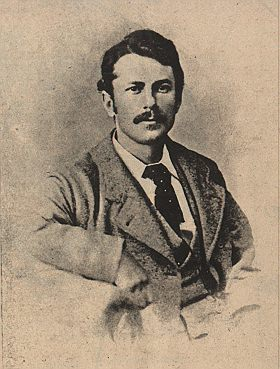
Edward Carpenter in 1875

The best-known British advocate of free love was the philosopher Bertrand Russell, later Third Earl Russell, who said that he did not believe he really knew a woman until he had had sex with her. Russell consistently addressed aspects of free love throughout his voluminous writings, and was not personally content with conventional monogamy until extreme old age. His most famous work on the subject was Marriage and Morals, published in 1929. The book heavily criticizes the Victorian notions of morality regarding sex and marriage. Russell argued that the laws and ideas about sex of his time were a potpourri from various sources, which were no longer valid with the advent of contraception, as the sexual acts are now separated from the conception. He argued that family is most important for the welfare of children, and as such, a man and a woman should be considered bound only after her first pregnancy.

Marriage and Morals prompted vigorous protests and denunciations against Russell shortly after the book's publication. A decade later, the book cost him his professorial appointment at the City College of New York due to a court judgment that his opinions made him "morally unfit" to teach. Contrary to what many people believed, Russell did not advocate an extreme libertine position. Instead, he felt that sex, although a natural impulse like hunger or thirst, involves more than that, because no one is "satisfied by the bare sexual act". He argued that abstinence enhances the pleasure of sex, which is better when it "has a large psychical element than when it is purely physical".

Russell noted that for a marriage to work requires that there "be a feeling of complete equality on both sides; there must be no interference with mutual freedom; there must be the most complete physical and mental intimacy; and there must be a certain similarity in regard to standards of value". He argued that it was, in general, impossible to sustain this mutual feeling for an indefinite length of time, and that the only option in such a case was to provide for either the easy availability of divorce, or the social sanction of extra-marital sex.

Russell's view on marriage changed as he went through personal struggles of subsequent marriages; in his autobiography he writes, "I do not know what I think now about the subject of marriage. There seem to be insuperable objections to every general theory about it. Perhaps easy divorce causes less unhappiness than any other system, but I am no longer capable of being dogmatic on the subject of marriage."

Russell was also a very early advocate of repealing sodomy laws.

However, despite some historical social convention standards, fornication restriction was hardly ever enforced in the United Kingdom.

==== France ====
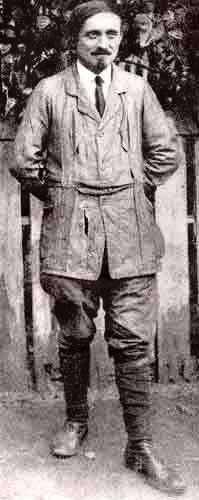
Émile Armand

An important propagandist of free love was individualist anarchist Émile Armand. He advocated naturism and polyamory in what he termed la camaraderie amoureuse. He wrote many propagandist articles on this subject such as "De la liberté sexuelle" (1907) where he advocated not only a vague free love but also multiple partners, which he called "plural love". In the individualist anarchist journal L'en dehors he and others continued in this way. Armand seized this opportunity to outline his theses supporting revolutionary sexualism and camaraderie amoureuse that differed from the traditional views of the partisans of free love in several respects.

Later Armand submitted that from an individualist perspective nothing was reprehensible about making "love", even if one did not have very strong feelings for one's partner. "The camaraderie amoureuse thesis", he explained, "entails a free contract of association (that may be annulled without notice, following prior agreement) reached between anarchist individualists of different genders, adhering to the necessary standards of sexual hygiene, with a view toward protecting the other parties to the contract from certain risks of the amorous experience, such as rejection, rupture, exclusivism, possessiveness, unicity, coquetry, whims, indifference, flirtatiousness, disregard for others, and prostitution." He also published Le Combat contre la jalousie et le sexualisme révolutionnaire (1926), followed over the years by Ce que nous entendons par liberté de l'amour (1928), La Camaraderie amoureuse ou "chiennerie sexuelle" (1930), and, finally, La Révolution sexuelle et la camaraderie amoureuse (1934), a book of nearly 350 pages comprising most of his writings on sexuality. In a text from 1937, he mentioned among the individualist objectives the practice of forming voluntary associations for purely sexual purposes of heterosexual, homosexual, or bisexual nature or of a combination thereof.

He also supported the right of individuals to change sex and stated his willingness to rehabilitate forbidden pleasures, non-conformist caresses (he was personally inclined toward voyeurism), as well as sodomy. This led him to allocate more and more space to what he called "the sexual non-conformists", while excluding physical violence. His militancy also included translating texts from people such as Alexandra Kollontai and Wilhelm Reich and establishments of free love associations which tried to put into practice la camaraderie amoureuse through actual sexual experiences.

Free love advocacy groups active during this time included the Association d'Études sexologiques and the Ligue mondiale pour la Réforme sexuelle sur une base scientifique.

==== USSR ====
After the October Revolution in Russia, Alexandra Kollontai became the most prominent woman in the Soviet administration. Kollontai was also a champion of free love. However, Clara Zetkin recorded that Lenin opposed free love as "completely un-Marxist, and moreover, anti-social". Zetkin also recounted Lenin's denunciation of plans to organise Hamburg's women prostitutes into a "special revolutionary militant section": he saw this as "corrupt and degenerate".

Despite the traditional marital lives of Lenin and most Bolsheviks, they believed that sexual relations were outside the jurisdiction of the state. The Soviet government abolished centuries-old Czarist regulations on personal life, which had prohibited homosexuality and made it difficult for women to obtain divorce permits or to live singly. However, by the end of the 1920s, Stalin had taken control of the Communist Party and begun to implement socially conservative policies. Homosexuality was classified as a mental disorder, and free love was further demonized.

=== Recent ===
With the Summer of Love in 1967, the eccentricities of the Beat Generation became a nationally recognized movement. Despite the developing sexual revolution and the influence of the Beatniks in this new counterculture social rebellion, it has been acknowledged that the New Left movement was arguably the most prominent advocate of free love during the late 1960s. Many among the counterculture youth sided with New Left arguments that marriage was a symbol of the traditional capitalist culture which supported war. "Make Love Not War" became a popular slogan in the counterculture movement which denounced both war and capitalism. Images from the pro-socialist May 1968 uprising in France, which occurred as the anti-war protests were escalating throughout the United States, would provide a significant source of morale to the New Left cause as well.

Canadian Justice Minister, and future Prime Minister, Pierre Elliot Trudeau's 20 December 1967 statement "there's no place for the state in the bedrooms of the nation" was a very public declaration justifying his government's decriminalization of sexual activity between same sex partners in Canada, following 1967's Summer of Love.

== See also ==
- Anarchism and issues related to love and sex
- Common-law marriage
- Don Juanism
- Flower power
- Fornication
- Free union
- Glass of water theory
- Legitimacy (family law)
- Love-in
- Make love, not war
- New Woman
- Open marriage
- Polyamory
- Sex at Dawn: The Prehistoric Origins of Modern Sexuality
- Sex-positive movement
- Sexual norm
- Sexual objectification
- Sexual revolution
- Swinging
- Unconditional love
