= Minerva (German magazine) =

German historical and political journal (1792–1858)

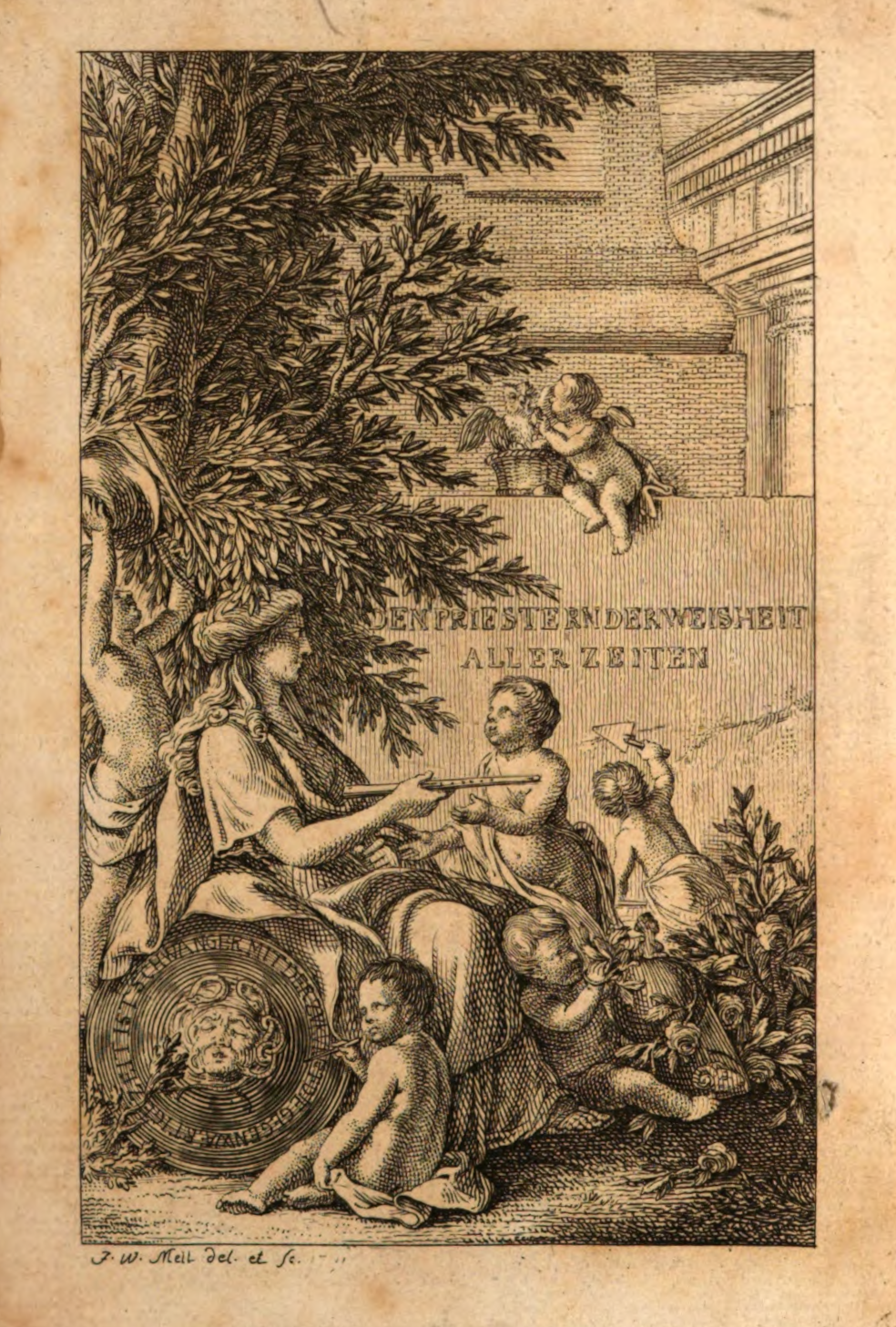
- Frontispiece by Johann Wilhelm Meil for the first volume of Minerva (1792)
- Native name: Minerva: Ein Journal historischen und politischen Inhalts
- Editor: Johann Wilhelm von Archenholz (1792–1809); Friedrich Alexander Bran (c. 1809–1831); Friedrich Johann Carl Bran (1831–1858)
- Categories: Historical and political journal
- Frequency: Monthly (fortnightly in early 1792)
- Circulation: c. 5,000 (early 19th century)
- Publisher: Johann Friedrich Unger; Johann Wilhelm von Archenholz; Friedrich Alexander Bran
- Founder: Johann Wilhelm von Archenholz
- Founded: 1792
- First issue: January 1792
- Final issue: 1858
- Country: Germany
- Based in: Berlin; Hamburg; Jena
- Language: German

Minerva (full title: Minerva: Ein Journal historischen und politischen Inhalts) was a German historical and political journal founded in 1792 by the journalist and travel writer Johann Wilhelm von Archenholz. It was launched in Berlin, moved to Hamburg later in 1792, and from 1808 was issued from Jena. Archenholz edited the journal until 1809. It was then continued by Friedrich Alexander Bran and, from 1831, by Friedrich Johann Carl Bran, and appeared until 1858.

Founded during the early French Revolution, Minerva became known for extensive revolutionary reporting and political commentary from a liberal perspective. It supported the Revolution’s initial constitutional phase and the idea of a constitutional monarchy, while sharply rejecting Jacobin radicalism. In Hamburg it was commonly regarded as occupying the liberal middle position between more conservative and more radical political periodicals, and it combined editorial reflections with reports and correspondence on events in France.

In the Napoleonic era, Minerva also participated in German debates about Prussia's defeat in 1806 and proposals for political and social "regeneration", including arguments over reform and national character. By the early nineteenth century it had an estimated circulation of around 5,000 copies and was read by educated audiences across Germany. Reported readers included Goethe, Schiller, and Hegel.

== Publication history ==
Founded and edited by Johann Wilhelm von Archenholz, a former Prussian army captain who became a widely traveled journalist and travel writer, Minerva was launched in January 1792 in Berlin. The first two volumes appeared fortnightly, printed by Johann Friedrich Unger. After a ten-month stay in Paris in 1791, Archenholz settled in Hamburg and in June 1792 moved the journal there. From its third volume in July 1792 it appeared monthly and was self-published by Archenholz. The journal's Hamburg run continued to 1810. Because the first two volumes were issued in Berlin, they were subject to Prussian press censorship, whereas Hamburg, like nearby Altona under Danish administration, enjoyed a comparatively liberal press regime. The city senate exercised its right of censorship only mildly, and the resulting freedom attracted many publicists favorable to the French Revolution. However, Archenholz's move to Hamburg in 1792 was for personal and practical reasons, not prompted by censorship. In these years the title page carried the notice that it was edited by “Johann Wilhelm von Archenholz, formerly captain in royal Prussian service”, a self-description he dropped after Prussia's defeat at Jena and Auerstedt in 1806, which he regarded as the end of the Hohenzollern monarchy.

After Archenholz's Hamburg years, from 1808 the journal continued to be issued from Jena. He remained editor until 1809, after which it was carried on under Friedrich Alexander Bran into the late 1850s. It ceased publication in 1858.

== Editorial stance ==
Minerva began as a liberal, pro-revolutionary journal that supported the French Revolution's early constitutional phase and the establishment of a constitutional monarchy, while firmly rejecting Jacobin radicalism. Together with the conservative Politisches Journal and the radical Niedersächsischer Merkur, it was one of three leading Hamburg-based political periodicals, and within this trio it occupied the liberal middle ground.

=== French Revolution (1792–1795) ===
In 1791, strongly impressed by the French Revolution and by the reports his friend Joachim Heinrich Campe sent from Paris, Archenholz decided to settle in the city with the explicit intention of founding a historical review. Arriving in Paris with his family in September 1791, he entered political life through the Club des Allemands, where he met his future collaborators Charles-Frédéric Reinhard and Konrad Engelbert Oelsner, who introduced him to Girondin circles. However, Helga Boulay argues that Archenholz himself aligned more closely with the Feuillants, the moderate constitutional monarchists. In this milieu he frequented Louis-Sébastien Mercier and André Chénier, both of whom later contributed to Minerva.

In the early 1792 Berlin-issued installments Minerva endorsed the Revolution of 1789 and the 1791 constitution, while rejecting the Revolution's later radicalization. In reporting on the Legislative Assembly inaugurated on 1 October 1791, it described signs of decline, judged the chamber's composition very negatively, and pointed to internal disorder and mounting external threats. It also portrayed the Legislative Assembly's membership as politically zealous but inexperienced, and sometimes emphasized the social status of deputies as part of its critique. These issues condemned Anacharsis Cloots and praised Mirabeau for rejecting outright republicanism. It showed little sympathy for the clergy or nobility, instead blaming provincial unrest on non-sworn priests and calling aristocrats politically short-sighted. The journal also argued for a moderate freedom of the press. In his first Minerva article, Archenholz retrospectively portrayed Louis XVI's flight to Varennes as a misguided error by a repentant king, encouraged by émigré and aristocratic influences, and read the king's partial sanctioning of legislative decrees in late 1791 as evidence of royal good faith and a possible harmony between crown and Legislative Assembly.

In April 1792, Minerva opened a sustained campaign against the Jacobins by publishing an article by the Feuillant writer André Chénier, and thereafter treated the Jacobin Club as a central target of its revolutionary coverage. It portrayed leading Jacobins, including Jérôme Pétion and Maximilien Robespierre, as demagogic agitators and dismissed as a "chimera" the claim, widespread in German counter-revolutionary circles, that the club directed an international "propaganda society." The journal also used coverage of revolutionary ceremonies to dramatize the widening split between Jacobins and their opponents, contrasting the Jacobin-associated celebration for the Swiss of Châteauvieux on 15 April 1792 with the Feuillant and Girondin commemoration of Simoneau on 3 June as a triumph of law, and faulting Louis XVI for not using the latter occasion to signal goodwill toward the nation. After the move to Hamburg in 1792, the third volume featured a concise "political creed" that formulated the editorial line in detail.

After mid-June 1792 Archenholz left Paris, and Minerva shifted its coverage of the Revolution toward correspondents while still printing editorial reflections. In commentary prompted by 10 August it tended to excuse the court as acting under threat and stressed that the Brunswick Manifesto backfired by intensifying popular hostility to the monarchy. The journal also published eyewitness accounts of 20 June and 10 August by correspondents who blamed Jacobin agitation and the Assembly's permissiveness for the breach of legality, while noting that violence and looting on 20 June were limited. Although he began to doubt the king once the War of the First Coalition broke out in 1792, Archenholz continued to depict Louis less as a deliberate traitor than as a monarch misled by his entourage. By 1795 he conceded that his earlier confidence in the king had been mistaken.

From August 1792 to March 1793, Minerva published Konrad Engelbert Oelsner's "historical letters" on events in France and signaled that his views should not be taken as identical with the editor's, both through prefatory warnings and through annotations and occasional cuts. Oelsner, described as a "moderate Jacobin" closely linked to Girondin circles, argued that Louis XVI had never sincerely accepted the 1791 constitution and interpreted royal vetoes and the conduct of the war as part of a counter revolutionary strategy. His account of 10 August combined approval of the king's suspension with anxiety about the violence of the insurrection and the growing role of the sans-culottes, and it treated the monarchy's fall as inevitable and necessary, in contrast to Minerva's more constitutional monarchist framing elsewhere.

=== Napoleonic era and national debates (1806–1813) ===
In the Napoleonic era Minerva took part in patriotic-national debates about Prussia's defeat and the "regeneration" of the state. Between 1806 and 1813 it published articles on political, social, economic, and military causes of the "national debacle", meaning Prussia's defeat in the War of the Fourth Coalition, and on proposals for reform in Prussia. Alongside criticism of existing political and military institutions, contributors also put forward cultural and religious explanations, arguing that irreligion, moral decline, and a lack of patriotic commitment among German men had contributed to the defeat. An article from 1811, for example, complained that men did not show the decisiveness and willingness to sacrifice for the common good that were held to sustain states, and spoke of an absence of "manly" courage and honor. Other contributors associated the supposed weakness of patriotism with what they called "perverse cosmopolitanism" and the imitation of French fashions, criticized as "Gallomania". From 1806 onwards, Minerva was also among the periodicals that opened an extended German-language debate on "national character", printing essays on the emergence of nations and on specifically "German" virtues and defects.

== Reception and influence ==
Minerva was widely read, including by such people as Johann Wolfgang von Goethe, Friedrich Schiller and Georg Wilhelm Friedrich Hegel. Friedrich Klopstock was one of the contributors.

In 1793, Archenholz remarked that popular appetite for political reporting on the French Revolution displaced other reading, reflecting the intense demand his journal addressed. By the early nineteenth century Minerva had become a journalistic institution with a long publication history and a print run of about 5,000 copies. It was especially popular with educated readers in central, eastern and northern Germany. Many Prussian officers and state officials subscribed, and Frederick William III is reported to have been a regular reader.
