= Queen Mab (poem) =

Poem by Percy Bysshe Shelley

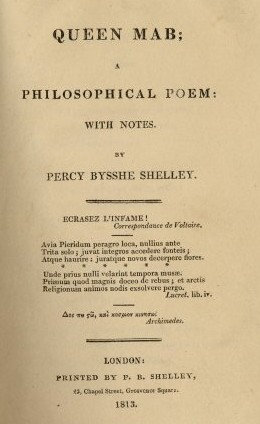
Title page of the limited first edition printed by Shelley himself, 1813.

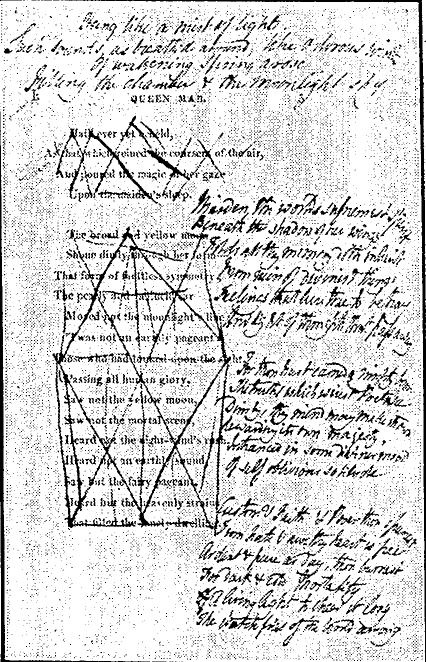
Original leaf from Shelley's copy of Queen Mab, 1813, in the Ashley Library.

Queen Mab; A Philosophical Poem; With Notes, published in 1813 in nine cantos with seventeen notes, is the first large poetic work written by Percy Bysshe Shelley (1792–1822), the English Romantic poet.

After substantial reworking, a revised edition of a portion of the text was published in 1816 under the title The Daemon of the World.

== History ==
This poem was written early in Shelley's career and serves as a foundation to his theory of revolution. It is his first major poem. In this work, he depicts a two-pronged revolt involving necessary changes, brought on by both nature and the virtuousness of humans.

Shelley printed the first edition himself in London: "Printed by P. B. Shelley" with three quotations by Voltaire, Lucretius, and Archimedes. The address given was 23, Chapel Street, Grosvenor Square.

Shelley took William Godwin's idea of "necessity" and combined it with his own idea of ever-changing nature, to establish the theory that contemporary societal evils would dissolve naturally in time. This was to be coupled with the creation of a virtuous mentality in people who could envision the ideal goal of a perfect society. The ideal was to be reached incrementally, because Shelley (as a result of Napoleon's actions in the French Revolution), believed that the perfect society could not be obtained immediately through violent revolution. Instead it was to be achieved through nature's evolution and ever-greater numbers of people becoming virtuous and imagining a better society.

He set the press and ran 250 copies of this radical and revolutionary tract. Queen Mab is infused with scientific language and naturalising moral prescriptions for an oppressed humanity in an industrialising world. He intended the poem to be private and distributed it among his close friends and acquaintances. About 70 sets of the signatures were bound and distributed personally by Shelley, and the rest were stored at William Clark's bookshop in London. A year before his death, in 1821, one of the shopkeepers caught sight of the remaining signatures. The shopkeeper bound the remaining signatures, printed an expurgated edition, and distributed the pirated editions through the black market. The copies were—in the words of Richard Carlisle—"pounced upon" by the Society for the Prevention of Vice. Shelley was dismayed upon discovering the piracy of what he considered to be not just a juvenile production but a work that could potentially "injure rather than serve the cause of freedom". He sought an injunction against the shopkeeper, but since the poem was considered illegal, he was not entitled to the copyright. William Clark was imprisoned for four months for publishing and distributing Queen Mab.

The British bookseller Richard Carlile issued a new edition of the poem in 1822 in London as "Printed and published by R. Carlile. 53, Fleet Street. In spite of prosecution from the Vice Society, Carlile was encouraged by the popularity Shelley's poem enjoyed with the working classes, progressives, and reformers into producing four separate editions of Queen Mab during the 1820s. Between 1821 and the 1830s over a dozen pirated editions of Queen Mab were produced and distributed among and by the labouring classes fuelling, and becoming a "bible" for Chartism.

When Shelley's widow, Mary Shelley, published her husband's Poetical Works in 1839, the dedication and several atheistic passages of the poem were omitted, but were restored in a second edition less than a year later. As a response to his own pending trial in 1840 for blasphemous libel, the first such case in 17 years, the Chartist Henry Hetherington brought similar blasphemous libel charges against Edward Moxon, the publisher, over the restored passages. The resulting trial, in which the prosecuting counsel "eulogized the genius of Shelley; and fairly admitted the respectability of the defendant," and Moxon was defended by Serjeant Talfourd, resulted in a guilty verdict, but the prosecution chose not to pursue any punishment beyond a payment of costs, and "there were no further attempts to impede the circulation of Queen Mab". The notes to the poem, which attack marriage as an institution, draw on The Empire of the Nairs (1811) by James Henry Lawrence, which Shelley had read in the spring of 1812 and told its author had made him "a perfect convert to its doctrines"; the argument connecting marriage and prostitution in the notes has been traced directly to Lawrence.

== Synopsis ==
The poem is written in the form of a fairy tale that presents a future vision of a utopia on earth, consisting of nine cantos and seventeen notes. Queen Mab, a fairy, descends in a chariot to a dwelling where Ianthe is sleeping on a couch. Queen Mab detaches Ianthe's spirit or soul from her sleeping body and transports it on a celestial tour to Queen Mab's palace at the edge of the universe.

Queen Mab interprets, analyses, and explains Ianthe's dreams. She shows her visions of the past, present, and the future. The past and present are characterised by oppression, injustice, misery, and suffering caused by monarchies, commerce, and religion. In the future, however, the condition of man will be improved and a utopia will emerge. Two key points are emphasised: 1) death is not to be feared; and, 2) the future offers the possibility of perfectibility. Humanity and nature can be reconciled and work in unison and harmony, not against each other.

Queen Mab returns Ianthe's spirit or soul to her body. Ianthe then awakens with a "gentle start".

Of the seventeen notes, six deal with the issues of atheism, vegetarianism, free love, the role of necessity in the physical and spiritual realm, and the relationship of Christ and the precepts of Christianity.

The theme of the work is the perfectibility of man by moral means.

Shelley's objective was to show that reform and improvement in the lot of mankind were possible. In her notes to the work, Mary Shelley explains the author's goals:

He was animated to greater zeal by compassion for his fellow-creatures. His sympathy was excited by the misery with which the world is bursting. He witnessed the sufferings of the poor, and was aware of the evils of ignorance. He desired to induce every rich man to despoil himself of superfluity, and to create a brotherhood of property and service, and was ready to be the first to lay down the advantages of his birth. He was of too uncompromising a disposition to join any party. He did not in his youth look forward to gradual improvement: nay, in those days of intolerance, now almost forgotten, it seemed as easy to look forward to the sort of millennium of freedom and brotherhood, which he thought the proper state of mankind, as to the present reign of moderation and improvement. Ill health made him believe that his race would soon be run; that a year or two was all he had of life. He desired that these years should be useful and illustrious. He saw, in a fervent call on his fellow-creatures to share alike the blessings of the creation, to love and serve each other, the noblest work that life and time permitted him. In this spirit he composed Queen Mab.

== Ahasuerus ==
Ahasuerus the "Wandering Jew" appears in Queen Mab as a phantom, but as a hermit healer in Shelley's last major work, the verse drama Hellas.

== Sources ==
- Baker, Carlos. (1941). "Spenser, The Eighteenth Century, and Shelley's Queen Mab." Modern Language Quarterly, 2(1):81–98.
- Morton, Timothy. "Queen Mab as Topological Repertoire," in Neil Fraistat, ed., Early Shelley: Vulgarisms, Politics and Fractals. Romantic Praxis, 1997.
- Forman, H. Buxton. The Vicissitudes of Shelley's Queen Mab; A Chapter in the History of Reform. London: Clay and Sons, 1887.
- Grimes, Kelly. (1995). "'Queen Mab', the Law of Libel and the Forms of Shelley's Politics." The Journal of English and Germanic Philology.
- Duffy, Cian. Shelley and the Revolutionary Sublime. Cambridge University Press, 2005.
- Fraistat, Neil. (2002). "The Material Shelley: Who Gets the Finger in Queen Mab?" Wordsworth Circle, Vol. 33.
- Burling, W. J. (1984). "Virginia Woolf's 'Lighthouse': An Allusion to Shelley's Queen Mab?" English Language Notes, 22, 2, pp. 62–65.
- Hecht, Jennifer Michael. Doubt: A History: The Great Doubters and Their Legacy of Innovation from Socrates and Jesus to Thomas Jefferson and Emily Dickinson. NY: HarperCollins, 2004.]
- Lee, Monika H. "'Nature's Silent Eloquence': Disembodied Organic Language in Shelley's Queen Mab." Nineteenth-Century Literature (1993) 48 (2): 169–193. 1 September 1993. https://doi.org/10.2307/2933889.
- Mitchell, Robert. "'Here is thy fitting Temple': Science, Technology and Fiction in Shelley's Queen Mab." Romanticism on the Net, Number 21, February 2001.
- Morton, Timothy. (2006). "Joseph Ritson, Percy Shelley and the Making of Romantic Vegetarianism." Romanticism, 12.1, pp. 52–61.
- Morton, Timothy. Shelley and the Revolution in Taste: The Body and the Natural World. New York: Cambridge University Press, 1995.
- Curtin, John. (1918). "Shelley, the Revolutionist." Westralian Worker.
- Raisor, Philip. "'Palmyra's Ruined Palaces!': The Influence of Shelley's 'Queen Mab' on Browning's 'Love Among The Ruins'." Victorian Poetry, Vol. 14, No. 2 (Summer, 1976), pp. 142–149.
- Schwartz, Lewis M. "Two New Contemporary Reviews of Shelley's 'Queen Mab'." Keats-Shelley Journal, Vol. 19, (1970), pp. 77–85.
- Scrivener, Michael Henry. Radical Shelley: The Philosophical Anarchism and Utopian Thought of Percy Bysshe Shelley. Princeton: Princeton University Press, 1982.
- Sloan, Gary. (July/August 2003). "Shelley: Angelic Atheist." Eclectica Magazine, 7, 3.
- Smith, Jessica. "Tyrannical Monuments and Discursive Ruins: The Dialogic Landscape of Shelley's Queen Mab." Keats-Shelley Journal, Vol. 47, (1998), pp. 108–141.
- Weinberg, Alan. "Freedom from the Stranglehold of Time: Shelley's Visionary Conception in Queen Mab." Romanticism, Volume 22, Issue 1, 5 April 2016. https://doi.org/10.3366/rom.2016.0259.
- Welsh, Dennis M. "Queen Mab and An Essay on Man: Scientific Prophecy versus Theodicy." College Language Association Journal, 29.4 (1986): 462–82.
