= Flora Tristan =

French socialist and feminist writer (1803–1844)

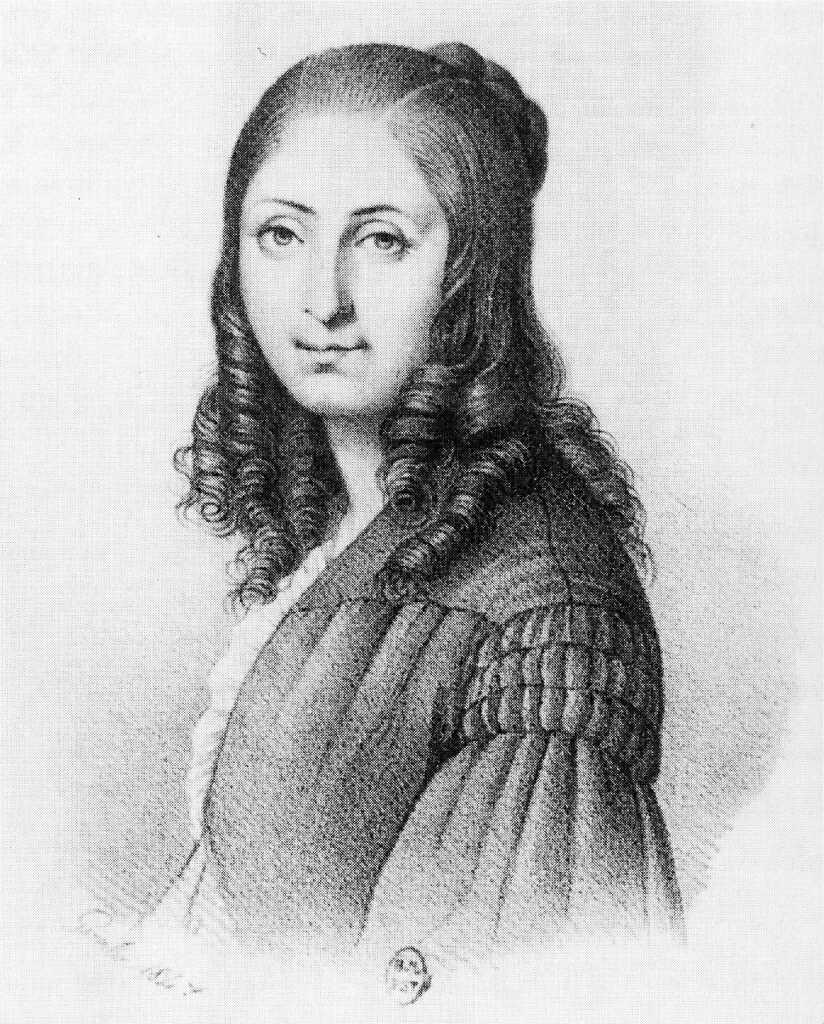
- Born: Flore Célestine Thérèse Henriette Tristán y Moscoso; 7 April 1803; Paris, French First Republic
- Died: Bordeaux, Gironde, Kingdom of France
- Occupation: Writer
- Writing career
- Notable work: Peregrinaciones de una paria

Flore Célestine Thérèse Henriette Tristán y Moscoso (7 April 1803 – 14 November 1844), better known as Flora Tristan, was a French-Peruvian writer and socialist activist. She made important contributions to early feminist theory. She argued that the progress of women's rights was directly related to the progress of the working class. She wrote several works, the best known of which are Peregrinations of a Pariah (1838), Promenades in London (1840), and The Workers' Union (1843). Tristan was the grandmother of the painter Paul Gauguin.

== Early life ==
Tristan's full name was Flore Célestine Thérèse Henriette Tristán y Moscoso. Her father, Mariano Eusebio Antonio Tristán y Moscoso, was a colonel of the Spanish Navy, born in Arequipa, a city in Peru. His family was one of the most powerful families in the south of the country; his brother Pío de Tristán became viceroy of Peru. Tristan's mother, Anne-Pierre Laisnay, was French; the couple met in Bilbao, Spain.

When Tristan's father died in 1807, before her fifth birthday, the family's situation changed drastically from the high standards of living Tristan and her mother were accustomed to. In 1833 she travelled to Arequipa to claim her paternal inheritance, which was in possession of her uncle, Juan Pío de Tristán y Moscoso. She remained in Peru until 16 July 1834. Though she never secured her inheritance, Tristan wrote a travel diary about her experiences in Peru during its tumultuous post-independence period. The diary was published in 1838 as Pérégrinations d'une paria (Peregrinations of a Pariah). Around this time, Tristan met and was influenced by the philosophy of the androgynous mystic Simon Ganneau, as well as the occultist writer Éliphas Lévi, her longtime friend.

Her married name was Chazal, legally changed to Tristan after separation in 1838.

== Marriage and separation ==
In 1821, at the age of seventeen, Tristan married the engraver and lithographer André Chazal, in whose brother's workshop she was employed as a colourist. The couple had three children, of whom the youngest, Aline (1825–1867), became the mother of the painter Paul Gauguin. Tristan left the marital home in March 1825, while pregnant with Aline, and never resumed cohabitation. Divorce having been abolished in France in 1816, she obtained only a separation of property, in 1828, and for several years lived under assumed names to escape her husband.

The dispute over the children lasted years. Chazal abducted Aline; in June 1837 Tristan brought a complaint of incest against him, which ended in a dismissal. On 14 March 1838 she obtained a judicial separation. On 10 September 1838 Chazal shot her in the chest, the bullet lodging near her heart; he was sentenced on 1 February 1839 by the Seine assize court to twenty years' hard labour, later commuted to imprisonment. Tristan then recovered the legal use of her maiden name.

== Petitions to the Chamber of Deputies ==
Tristan turned her own experience into a public argument. On 20 December 1837 she signed a petition to the Chamber of Deputies calling for the restoration of divorce, abolished in France since 1816; it was reprinted in Le Bon Sens on 30 December. A year later she addressed a further petition to the deputies against capital punishment, printed and sold under the title À Messieurs les membres de la Chambre des députés and reprinted in Le Journal du peuple on 16 December 1838.

In the second petition she presented the indissolubility of marriage as a cause of violent death, writing that two-thirds of poisonings and murders had as their motive "the jealousies and hatreds that result from the indissolubility of marriage and the servitude of women". In support she cited "M. James de Laurence, author of remarkable works" — the writer James Henry Lawrence, author of The Empire of the Nairs, who in 1828 had coined the term "mariticide" for a sex-disaggregated count of spouses killed by their partners — and, immediately afterwards, a formula she took from him and which he attributed to the marquis d'Herbouville, to the effect that since the abolition of divorce poison and the dagger had become ornaments of marriage. She restated the argument in Promenades dans Londres (1840), where she wrote that the indissolubility of marriage "places the dagger or the poison in the hands of spouses".

== Final years ==
Tristan left her home in Paris again in 1843 to embark on a tour of France to promote the ideas in her final work, L'Union Ouvrière (The Workers' Union). She journeyed from city to city, meeting with groups of worker activists, trying to interest them in her plan for a national Workers' Union. She urged them to break down occupational, regional and political barriers dividing them from each other, and to seek strength in national and global working-class solidarity.

She died suddenly in 1844. While exact causes are not known, her symptoms in the months preceding her death align with our modern understanding of Typhoid fever.

== Contributions ==
Tristan's writings and her personal contact with worker activists across France influenced the social struggles around the period of the revolutions of 1848. After her death, her followers tried to implement her plans for a Workers' Union, with little success. But her influence was key in the 1845 strike at the Toulon arsenal, a key moment in the story of French labour movement. According to the French historian Maurice Agulhon, Tristan's visit to Toulon during her travels radicalised its workers, contributing to the gestation of the strike. French workers placed a monument on her tomb in October 1848, in the wake of the French Revolution of 1848, with close to eight thousand workers marking the occasion by marching to her grave singing a song from The Workers' Union.

Through her writings, Flora Tristan was able to show the ability of women to conceptualize the idea of freedom even in the seemingly most inauspicious circumstances. This was early in evidence in her account of Peru. She proposed that there was "no place on earth where women are freer [and] more influential" than in the "fortunate" society she encountered in Lima, and this, in great measure, was not despite, but rather because of, its cultural backwardness in relation to Europe. Women were typically married by the age of eleven or twelve; did not appear on the street unless almost wholly disguised in an enveloping "walking dress"; and, like their husbands, had no formal schooling. But they did not take their husband's name; were able, in the anonymity of their dress, to move about the town, and enter liaisons, in almost complete freedom; and, where, in the absence of schools for either sex, "intelligence has to develop on its own resources", enjoyed a natural advantage.

Seeing the failure of the promises of capitalism, Tristan wrote from a deep desire for social progress—combining the women's struggle with socialism. Tristan highlighted themes and ideas that give primacy to worker's rights. She was the first one to conceive the idea that the emancipation of the proletariat would be the synthesis of the people's struggle against the bourgeoisie. She is now recognised as a thinker whose works bridged the gap between utopian socialism and "scientific socialism", influenced by utopian socialists such as Henri de Saint-Simon and Charles Fourier but rejecting the idea that ruling class benevolence would lead to socialism. Instead, she insisted on the primacy of class antagonism and proletarian self-emancipation. She added that socialism was only to be possible with the emancipation of the sexes; like Fourier's followers she saw women's liberation as an indicator of social progress.

She was therefore key in the story of the fusion of socialism and feminism: Tristan would be known as the “mother of feminism and of popular communitarian socialism”. Tristan was “the first woman to try to merge the proto-feminist and social discourses into a critical synthesis, opening the way leading for the future shape of feminism of a proletarian class character, which finds it inconceivable that there exist oppressed women who are capable of oppressing other women”. She organized the fragmented ideas of women's equality at that time, brought by the French Revolution, providing a platform for the later rise of first wave feminism in the late 19th century.

Tristan would die “defending the rights of the proletarian or rather demanding them for him; she died whilst preaching, through her words and her actions, the law of union and love that she had brought to him”.

== Works ==
- Nécessité de faire un bon accueil aux femmes étrangères (1835)
- Pérégrinations d'une paria (1837–1838), 2 vols
- Méphis (1838), her only novel, reissued in 1843 as Maréquita l'Espagnole
- Promenades dans Londres (1840; popular edition, 1842)
- L'Union ouvrière (1843)
- Le Tour de France (written 1843–1844, published 1973)
- L'Émancipation de la femme ou Le Testament de la paria (posthumous, 1845)
- Tristan, Flora. The Workers Union. Translated by Beverly Livingston. Chicago: University of Illinois Press, 1983, 77–78.
- Máire Cross. The Feminism of Flora Tristan. Berg, Oxford, 1992. ISBN 0-85496-731-1
- Máire Cross. The Letter in Flora Tristan's Politics, 1835-1844, Basingstoke: Palgrave, 2004. ISBN 0-333-77264-4
- Flora Tristan’s Diary: The Tour of France 1843–1844, translated, annotated and introduced by Máire Fedelma Cross. Berne: Peter Lang, 2002. ISBN 978-3-906768-48-9
- Dominique Desanti. A Woman in Revolt: A Biography of Flora Tristan. New York: Crown Publishers, Inc., 1976. ISBN 0-517-51878-3
- The London Journal of Flora Tristan, translated, annotated and introduced by Jean Hawkes. London: Virago Press, 1982. ISBN 0-86068-214-5
- Tristan, Flora. Peregrinations of a Pariah, translated by Jean Hawkes. London: Virago Press, 1985. ISBN 0-86068-477-6
- Beik, Doris and Paul. Flora Tristan: Utopian Feminist: Her Travel Diaries and Personal Crusade. Bloomington: Indiana University Press, 1993.
- Dijkstra, Sandra. Flora Tristan: Feminism in the Age of George Sand. London: Pluto Press, 1992. ISBN 0745304508
- Krulic, Brigitte. ‘’Flora Tristan.’’ Paris: Gallimard/NRF, 2022. ISBN 978-2-07-282022-9
- Melzer, Sara E. and Rabine, Leslie W. Rebel Daughters: Women and the French Revolution. New York: Oxford University Press, 1992, 284.
- Schneider, Joyce Anne. Flora Tristan: Feminist, Socialist, and Free Spirit. New York: Morrow, 1980. ISBN 0688222501.
- Strumingher, Laura L. The Odyssey of Flora Tristan. New York: Peter Lang, 1988. University of Cincinnati Studies in Historical and Contemporary Europe, vol. 2. ISBN 0820408883
