= The Empire of the Nairs =

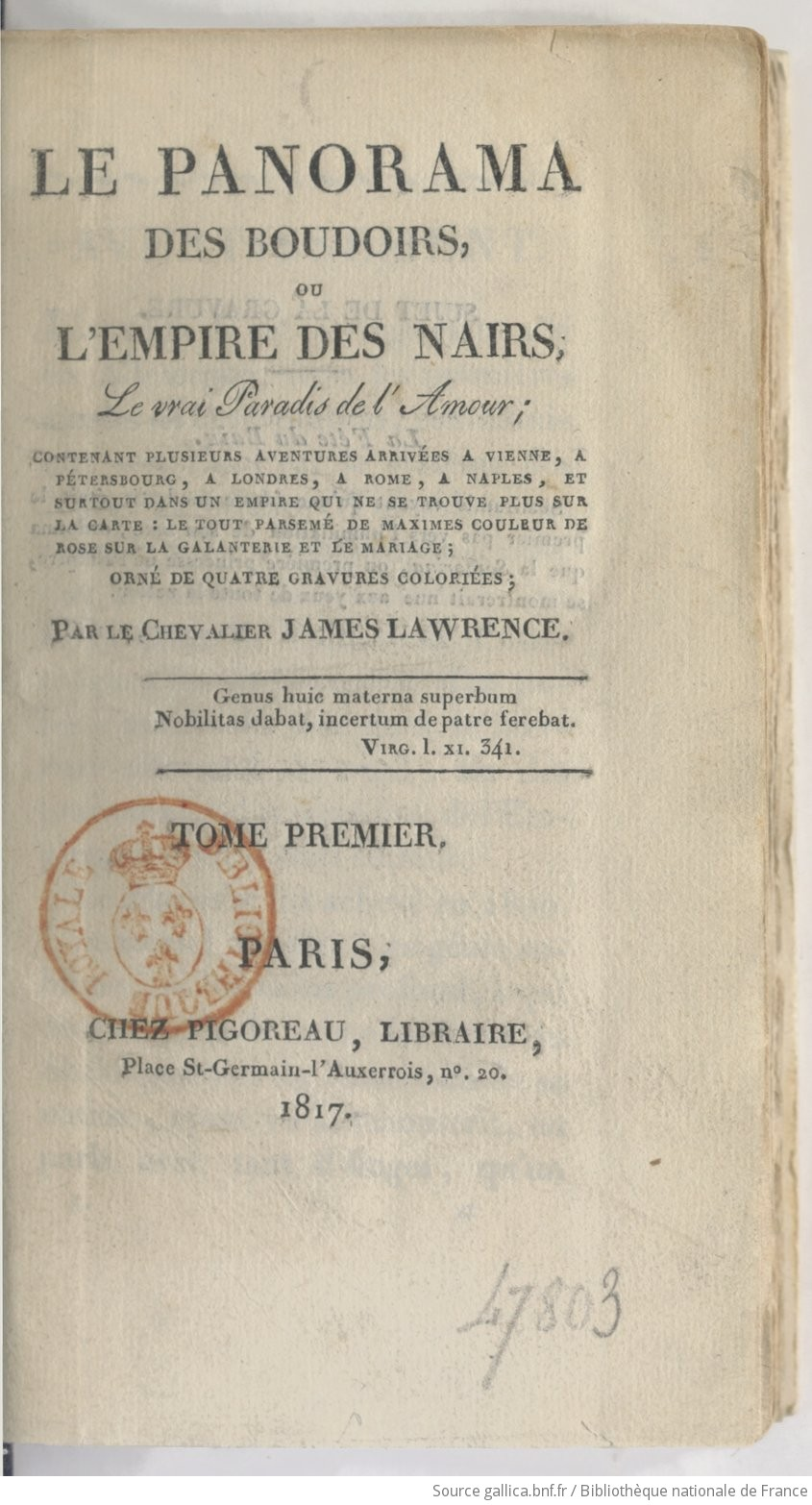
- Title page of the first volume of the Pigoreau edition, Paris, 1817
- Author: James Henry Lawrence
- Original title: Das Paradies der Liebe
- Translator: the author
- Language: German
- Genre: Utopian novel
- Set in: Calicut, 1792
- Publisher: Ungers Journalhandlung
- Publication date: 1801
- Publication place: Germany
- English publication date: 1811
- Media type: Print

The Empire of the Nairs; or, the Rights of Women is a utopian novel by the British writer James Henry Lawrence (1773–1840), first published in German as Das Paradies der Liebe (Berlin, 1801) and issued in French as L'Empire des Nairs, ou Le Paradis de l'amour (1807) before appearing in English in 1811. Grown out of an essay Lawrence published at the age of twenty in Christoph Martin Wieland's Neuer Teutscher Merkur in 1793, the text went through some fifteen editions in three languages between 1793 and 1838, all of them translated by the author himself.

Modelled on the matrilineal system of the Nairs of the Malabar Coast, the novel describes a society that has abolished marriage and, with it, paternity: descent is exclusively maternal, women inherit property, transmit their name and raise their children alone, and unions are free and revocable. Where the boldest critics of marriage of the period called for divorce or for its desacralisation, Lawrence proposed abolishing the institution itself and transferring property to women — a reversal no other writer on the rights of women envisaged at that date.

Seized by the Napoleonic censorship on its French publication in 1807 and banned in Prussia in 1809, savaged by the Critical Review in 1811, the book was nonetheless read and discussed by Wieland, Schiller and Goethe, admired by Percy Bysshe Shelley, quoted by Robert Owen and taken up by the Saint-Simonian feminists. Long classed by bibliographies among erotic curiosities, it has been reassessed since the 1970s; in 1997 Gregory Claeys described it as the most important feminist work between Mary Wollstonecraft's Vindication and the Appeal of Thompson and Wheeler.

== Background ==
=== The 1793 essay ===
In 1792 Lawrence completed his studies at Braunschweig, after Eton College (1782–1790) and the University of Göttingen (1791). There he wrote, in German, an essay entitled "Ueber die Vortheile des Systems der Galanterie und Erbfolge bey den Nayren", which an unidentified professor passed on to Christoph Martin Wieland. Wieland published it anonymously in his Neuer Teutscher Merkur in June–July 1793, accompanied by an editorial caveat of his own.

=== Ethnographic sources ===
The system Lawrence describes came to him from travel accounts of the Nairs of the Malabar Coast, a warrior caste of south-western India organised on matrilineal lines, in which inheritance and name passed through women and marriage in its European form did not exist. Lawrence did not offer an ethnographic description: he used the Nairs as the fulcrum of a demonstration, showing that a society without marriage or paternity had existed and could therefore exist again.

=== From essay to novel ===
A reader of Mary Wollstonecraft, whom he had discovered during his studies in Germany, Lawrence expanded the essay into a novel in twelve books. Schiller recommended the manuscript to the Berlin publisher Johann Friedrich Unger in November 1800, and Das Paradies der Liebe appeared the following year, without the author's name.

== Plot ==
The action takes place at Calicut, on the Malabar Coast, in 1792. The empire of Hindustan, ruled by a sovereign called the Samorin, presents a social order that is the inverse of Europe's: paternity is unknown, the inhabitants call themselves "mother's sons", and an equal liberty of the sexes prevails, coupled with distinct functions — women bear and raise children, mother's sons bear arms. The empire's founding narrative supplies the key: the ancestor Semiramis had her followers throw their wedding rings into the Indus — "we shall not wear the marks of slavery here" — and, once enthroned, instituted the Order of the Phoenix to defend the rights of women.

The matrilineal line that has reigned for four thousand years is under threat. Agalva, the Emperor's only sister, left the kingdom seventeen years earlier, leaving behind her son Firnos; without an heiress — that is, without a sister for Firnos — the dynasty must die out. The novel is the story of the search for Agalva, whose wide geographical range and nested narratives allow the author to compare the marriage customs of three worlds.

=== Volume one ===
The organisation of the empire is described through the eyes of the Englishman Walter Degrey: the liberty of women, property transmitted through them, honours paid to mothers, the celibacy of warriors held up as the vivifying principle of the nation. Charged with finding Agalva, Degrey sails for England with the young prince Firnos.

=== Volume two ===
This volume is given over to an indictment of English marriage: marital surveillance, prostitution in London, the disgrace visited on seduced girls, and the paradox of the husband who neglects his wife precisely because she belongs to him. Two destinies carry the argument. First that of Marguerite Montgomery, promised to a neighbour who proves, too late, to be her brother, and who moves from dishonour to involuntary incest and three deaths before throwing into the Thames the child Agalva will save. Then that of Agalva herself, whose memoirs record her observation of England conducted in male disguise; from her love affair with the Englishman Fitz-Allan is born Osva, the awaited heiress, who is at once abducted.

=== Volume three ===
The story of Camilla — in fact Osva, the missing heiress — displays an upbringing freed from the roles of sex. Raised in hardship and liberty by a band of Bohemians, to whom she owes the vigour of her health, then taken in hand by a barren aunt who means to correct her habits and repeats that "she must know how to spin, knit, embroider, and her catechism; that is enough for a woman", the girl reads Voltaire, Rousseau, Hume and Gibbon in secret, then Wollstonecraft's Vindication, before escaping in boy's clothes to Eton, where her vigour lets her excel without arousing suspicion. Fitz-Allan, brought up on the precepts of Lord Chesterfield, embodies the author's masculine model, compounded of gallantry and French conjugal liberty: it is in Paris that the Nair women swear they would settle if ever they had to go into exile. It is also in this volume that Firnos and Camilla-Osva, brother and sister, have a daughter together, Marina — an incest the novel never names.

=== Volume four ===
The Mahometan counter-model is set against Europe. The travels of Lacy, Agalva's first lover, review various continental legislations — Prussia, liberal but patrilineal, Austria with its "tribunal of chastity", Italy and its cruel alternatives — while the captivity of Emma, Degrey's sister, sold from town to town across the East, serves to depict the treatment of women south of the Mediterranean. The quest ends with Agalva's liberation and the toast she raises "to the maintenance and triumph of the rights of women".

== The Nair system ==
=== The abolition of paternity ===
The target of the system Lawrence imagines is not marriage alone but the institution marriage carries: paternity, on which the whole system of descent depends. Since paternity is never certain, he holds it illusory to anchor descent in it, and proposes founding descent exclusively on maternity, the only certainty. In doing so he reverses the standpoint of the legislators of his day: what matters is no longer the father's right to secure a posterity, but the child's right to a certain origin.

In this system mothers alone hold parental authority and alone own property: they bear and transmit their name, their status and their goods — rights no legislation of the period granted to women — and the poorest among them are paid for their procreative labour, which secures their complete independence from men. The family is recentred on the mother and her children, unions remaining free and revocable.

=== A hierarchy of civilisations ===
The novel orders its material according to a hierarchy of civilisations whose sole measure is the degree of liberty enjoyed by women: at the bottom the Mahometan nations, which confine them to harems; at the top the Nair empire, where they are free; in the middle a Europe that "tyrannises both sexes equally" through marriage. Lawrence might have placed Europe last, since both sexes there are equally victims of the matrimonial system; that he does not is because his criterion remains the liberty of women, which he holds to be more objective than any definition of happiness.

The argument reaches its sharpest point in a maxim of the second volume: the adulterous wife steals from her husband only his rights as a proprietor, whereas the husband who restrains his wife steals her liberty — "and is liberty not of more value than property?" The only coherent answer to men's anxiety about the uncertainty of their descent is therefore not the surveillance of wives but the abolition of paternity.

=== A reciprocal liberation ===
Lawrence presents this abolition as a liberation of both sexes: marriage is in his eyes a gaol that confines them both, in which the husband is merely "the more favoured of the two" prisoners; husbands and fathers give way to sons, brothers and lovers — a programme summed up by the title of the last French version of the novel, Plus de Maris ! Plus de Pères ! ("No more husbands! No more fathers!", 1837).

Among the critics of marriage of his time, few went as far as François Boissel or William Godwin in proposing the abolition of paternity; none imagined, as he did, the exclusive transfer of property to women, uniting in the same hands reproduction and the means of production. The art historian Patricia Mainardi situates the novel within the French debate on marriage and its discontents in the nineteenth century.

=== Incest and fertility ===
Two consequences of the system are accepted by the novel. Incest first: the daughter born to Firnos and his sister Osva calls forth no comment, because in a society without fathers or patrilineal transmission the act ceases to be a crime and becomes no more than an infringement of a matrimonial law which, among the Nairs, does not exist. Fertility next: the sexual civility Lawrence borrows from Lord Chesterfield and the Parisian aristocracy remains entirely conditional on an imperative of procreation — "Emma, you must become a mother" — in keeping with contemporary anxieties about depopulation; the only reproach men address to women is that of withholding themselves from motherhood.

The liberty of women is not, however, purchased by any subordination of men: the matrilineality Lawrence imagines is not a matriarchy, and the system is conceived not for the sole benefit of women but as an order in which the freedom of each sex is not built against the other.

== Publication history and censorship ==
The parent text went through some fifteen editions in three languages between 1793 and 1838, all translated by the author.

- "Ueber die Vortheile des Systems der Galanterie und Erbfolge bey den Nayren", Der Neue Teutsche Merkur, June–July 1793 (founding essay, anonymous).
- Das Paradies der Liebe, Berlin, Ungers Journalhandlung, 1801, 4 vols. (first novelistic version, anonymous).
- L'Empire des Nairs, ou Le Paradis de l'amour, "Hamburg" [Paris, Maradan], 1807; reissued under the same title in 1814.
- Das Reich der Nairen oder das Paradies der Liebe. Ein platonischer Traum, Berlin, J. F. Unger, 1809 (first edition signed with the author's full name).
- An Essay on the Nair System of Gallantry and Inheritance, London, Ridgeway & Symonds, [c. 1809] (unauthorised English translation, in phonetic spelling).
- The Empire of the Nairs; or, the Rights of Women. An Utopian Romance, London, T. & E. T. Hookham, 1811, 4 vols.; 2nd ed. 1813; 3rd ed. as The Empire of the Nairs or, the Panorama of Love, London, J. Sudbury, 1824.
- Le Panorama des Boudoirs, ou L'Empire des Nairs, Paris, Pigoreau, 1817, 4 vols.
- Plus de Maris ! Plus de Pères ! ou Le Paradis des Enfans de Dieu, Paris, Roux/Delaunay, 1837; 2nd ed. Grimbert et Dorez, 1838 (last version published in the author's lifetime).

The French version of 1807 was published by Maradan, the Parisian publisher of Madame de Genlis, under the fictitious imprint of Hamburg. It was seized by the Napoleonic censorship on 24 April 1807, a few days after going on sale, and its circulation in France was authorised only in 1814; in the meantime it was sold in Frankfurt and Hamburg. The German reissue of 1809 was in turn banned in Prussia.

== Reception ==
=== In the German-speaking world ===
The text circulated from the outset in the leading German literary circles. Wieland published the 1793 essay while distancing himself from it; Schiller recommended the manuscript of the novel to his publisher Unger in 1800; Goethe, who read the French edition in 1808 and supported the author for three decades, ultimately called the book "the work of a madman of much wit".

Germany was the country where the novel was best received. In November 1801 the Hamburgh Review stressed its originality: "This is a work perfectly original, and will in many respects make a new era in European culture." In October 1802 the Gotha Review noted its descent from Wollstonecraft while judging its plan more far-reaching: "The author adopts the principles of Wollstonecraft, but his plan is more extensive and consistent. […] The intention of this Romance is to show the possibility of a nation attaining the highest degree of civilization without marriage."

=== In Britain ===
The English edition, published in May 1811, was badly received by the press. The Critical Review devoted four biting pages to it, predicting that no English lady would fail to throw it down "in disgust and indignation", judging it "at once absurd, improbable, indecent, immoral, and fit only for the flames" — while quoting from it at length. The reviewer doubted that Lawrence was English at all and concluded: "So much for the German romances, German morality, and German nonsense."

Percy Bysshe Shelley, by contrast, wrote to Lawrence on 17 August 1812 a letter of admiration in which he declared the book decisive in his own condemnation of marriage; his poem Queen Mab (1813) is held to draw on the system of free love he found there. The American politician Aaron Burr, who met Lawrence in London in March 1812, proposed founding a "Nairish republic" in America; Robert Owen was still quoting him in 1831, and the radical publisher Richard Carlile reprinted the 1793 essay in his journal The Lion in 1828.

=== In France ===
Banned from circulation between 1807 and 1814, the novel found a posthumous platform among the Saint-Simonian feminists: Suzanne Voilquin and Claire Démar discussed and defended its arguments, and Flora Tristan cited "M. James de Laurence, author of remarkable works" in her 1838 petition for the re-establishment of divorce.

== Legacy ==
=== Reprints ===
Das Paradies der Liebe was reprinted three times between 1900 and 1923 by Georg Müller in Munich; in the 1930s Hugo Landgraf devoted to the author a first biography, which remained unpublished. The feminist Zurich house Ala-Verlag, run by Berta Rahm, reissued the text in 1971, and a facsimile of the English edition of 1811 appeared in 1976 with an introduction by Janet Todd.

=== Critical fortune ===
The scholarly fortune of the novel long lay between neglect and opprobrium. Nineteenth-century dictionaries accumulated errors and condescension — Pierre Larousse in 1873 turned the title into "L'Empire des noirs" ("The Empire of the Blacks") — while bibliographies filed it under erotic literature and "singular opinions"; in 1892 the Dictionary of National Biography called it "unquestionably dull". The first substantial French study came from an opponent: in 1910–1911 the anti-feminist polemicist Théodore Joran presented the book as an example of the "depraved literature" of the feminists.

The novel was rediscovered on the margins of Shelley scholarship: as early as 1925 Walter Graham established its importance among Shelley's sources, and it has been linked to Mary Shelley's Frankenstein. Its reassessment from the 1970s onwards has often remained tinged with suspicion as to the sincerity of its feminism: Lyman Tower Sargent saw in it in 1976 no more than "a male sexual fantasy", whereas Gregory Claeys in 1997 described it as the most important feminist work between Wollstonecraft's Vindication and the Appeal of Thompson and Wheeler, and opened his anthology Modern British Utopias with it. The first monograph devoted to Lawrence and his novel appeared in 2025.

== Bibliography ==
- Verjus, Anne (2025). Abolir le patriarcat: L'utopie féministe de James Henry Lawrence (1773–1840) (in French). Saint-Étienne: Presses universitaires de Saint-Étienne. ISBN 978-2-86272-793-6.
- Verjus, Anne (2019). "Can a Society Without Fathers Be Feminist? L'Empire des Nairs by James H. Lawrence". French Historical Studies. 42 (3): 359–389. doi:10.1215/00161071-7558292.
- Graham, Walter (1925). "Shelley and the Empire of the Nairs". PMLA. 40 (4): 881–891.
- Neff, David S. (1996). "The "Paradise of the Mothersons": Frankenstein and The Empire of the Nairs". The Journal of English and Germanic Philology. 95 (2): 204–222.
- Claeys, Gregory (1997). Modern British Utopias, 1700–1850. Vol. 5. London: Pickering & Chatto.
