= James Henry Lawrence =

English writer

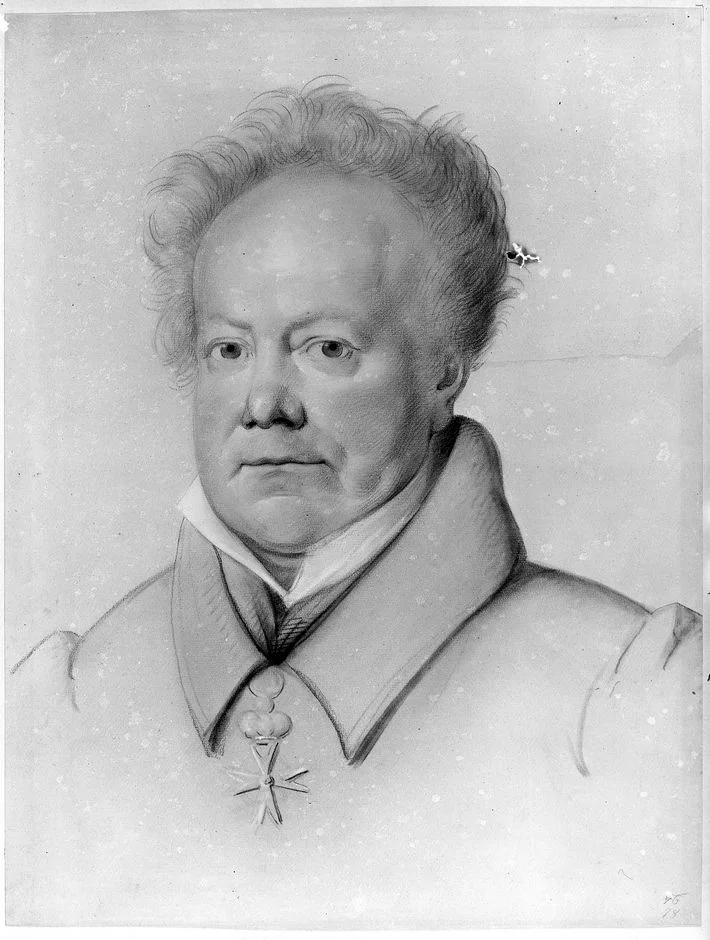
James Henry Lawrence, drawn by Johann Joseph Schmeller (1829). Klassik Stiftung Weimar.

James Henry Lawrence (26 February 1773 – 17 September 1840) was a British writer. He is known for his utopian novel The Empire of the Nairs, or the Rights of Women, which appeared in English in 1811. It was influenced by the political writing of Mary Wollstonecraft and William Godwin.

== Life ==
Lawrence was born in London on 26 February 1773 and baptised at Marylebone on 6 March, the eldest of the five sons of Richard James Lawrence (1745–1830), an absentee slave-owner of Fairfield, Jamaica, and his wife Mary Hall (1747–1815), who had been born on the Worcester plantation in Saint James Parish, Jamaica, and later sat as a model for Benjamin West.

He was educated at Eton College from 1782 to 1790, where he was chosen as Montem poet in 1790, and matriculated at the University of Göttingen on 17 July 1791, together with his father and his brother Charles; he completed his studies at Brunswick in 1792.

Lawrence led an itinerant life, mainly in continental Europe. In 1803, in France with his father, he was arrested, along with other English residents and tourists, and was detained for several years at Verdun. He escaped by passing himself off as an Austrian. He received compensation for the Fairfield estate, under the Slave Compensation Act 1837.

From 1802 onwards he styled himself "the Chevalier Lawrence" and later "Sir James Lawrence, Knight of Malta", a title he used on his title pages and even in his will; no trace of him has, however, been found in the registers of the Order of Malta, and the contemporary Thomas Medwin claimed the cross had been purchased in Paris. Lawrence died unmarried in London on 17 September 1840, and was buried on 21 September with his parents in the family vault in the burying-ground of St John's Wood Chapel.

== The Empire of the Nairs ==
Lawrence's principal work originated as an essay published in German, when he was twenty, in Christoph Martin Wieland's Neuer Teutscher Merkur in 1793. Expanded into a novel, the text went through some fifteen editions in three languages between 1793 and 1838, all translated by the author himself: Das Paradies der Liebe (Berlin, 1801), L'Empire des Nairs (Paris, 1807, immediately seized by the Napoleonic censorship), and The Empire of the Nairs, or the Rights of Women (London, 1811); the second German edition of 1809 was banned in Prussia as well.

Modelled on the matrilineal system of the Nairs of Malabar, the novel imagines a society without marriage or paternal authority: women inherit property, transmit their name and raise their children alone, while unions are free and revocable. A reader of Mary Wollstonecraft, whom he had discovered during his studies in Germany, Lawrence presented the system as securing the liberty of both sexes. He pursued this critique to the end of his life, notably coining in 1828 the concept of "mariticide", a gendered count, compiled from the French and English press, of spouses killed by their partners.

=== The abolition of fatherhood ===
The target of Lawrence's system is not marriage alone but the institution it carries: fatherhood, on which the whole system of filiation depends. Since paternity can never be certain, he holds it illusory to found descent upon it, and anchors filiation exclusively in motherhood, the only certain parentage; he thereby reverses the standpoint of the legislators of his time, making central not the father's right to secure a posterity but the child's right to a certain origin.

Lawrence presented this abolition as a reciprocal liberation: marriage was in his eyes a jail confining both sexes, in which the husband was merely the more favoured of the two prisoners; husbands and fathers were to be replaced by sons, brothers and lovers — a programme summed up by the title of the novel's final French version, Plus de Maris ! Plus de Pères ! ("No more husbands! No more fathers!", 1837). Among the critics of marriage of his time, few — such as François Boissel or William Godwin — went as far as proposing the abolition of fatherhood; none imagined, as he did, the exclusive transfer of property to women, uniting reproduction and the means of production in the same hands.

== Reception ==
The text circulated from the outset in the leading literary circles of the day: Wieland published the 1793 essay with an editorial caveat of his own, Schiller recommended the manuscript of the novel to his Berlin publisher Johann Friedrich Unger in 1800, and Goethe, who read the French edition in 1808 and supported the author over three decades, ultimately judged the book "the work of a madman of much wit". In England, Percy Bysshe Shelley wrote Lawrence an admiring letter in August 1812, and the novel circulated in his circle; Aaron Burr, who met the author in London in 1812, proposed founding a "Nairish republic" in America; Robert Owen was still quoting him in 1831, and the radical publisher Richard Carlile reprinted the 1793 essay in The Lion in 1828. In France, the Saint-Simonian feminists gave him a posthumous audience: Claire Démar defended his ideas, and Flora Tristan cited "M. James de Laurence, author of remarkable works" in her 1838 petition for the re-establishment of divorce.

== Legacy ==
Largely forgotten after his death, Lawrence has enjoyed an intermittent afterlife. Das Paradies der Liebe was reprinted three times between 1900 and 1923 by Georg Müller in Munich; in the 1930s Hugo Landgraf wrote the first biography of Lawrence, which remained unpublished. The feminist Zurich publisher Ala-Verlag, run by Berta Rahm, reissued the text in 1971, and a facsimile of the English edition appeared in 1976 with an introduction by Janet Todd. Shelley scholarship has engaged with the novel since 1925, and it has been linked to Mary Shelley's Frankenstein. The first monograph devoted to Lawrence appeared in 2025.

== Works ==
Lawrence wrote and published in English, French and German, translating his own texts.

- The Bosom Friend (London, 1791), a poem "by an Etonian"
- An Address to the National Convention of France (Wolfenbüttel and London, 1793)
- The Virgin of the Sun (London, 1799), translation from Kotzebue
- Love, An Allegory (London, 1802)
- The Empire of the Nairs: Das Paradies der Liebe (Berlin, 1801); L'Empire des Nairs (Paris, 1807; released 1814); Das Reich der Nairen (Berlin, 1809); The Empire of the Nairs, or the Rights of Women (London, 1811; 2nd ed. 1813; 3rd ed. 1824); Le Panorama des Boudoirs (Paris, 1817); Plus de Maris ! Plus de Pères ! (Paris, 1837, 2nd ed. 1838)
- A Picture of Verdun, or the English detained in France (London, 1810, 2 vols.; 3rd ed. 1812)
- The Englishman at Verdun; or, the Prisoner of Peace (London, 1813), a drama written at Verdun in 1804
- On the Nobility of the British Gentry (London, 1824; 4th enlarged ed. 1840)
- The Etonian out of Bounds (London, 1828, 2 vols.; reissued 1829, 1834), a collection of some 140 shorter writings
- Les Enfants de Dieu (Paris, 1831); English version The Children of God (London, 1833)
