= Johann Friedrich Unger =

German printer

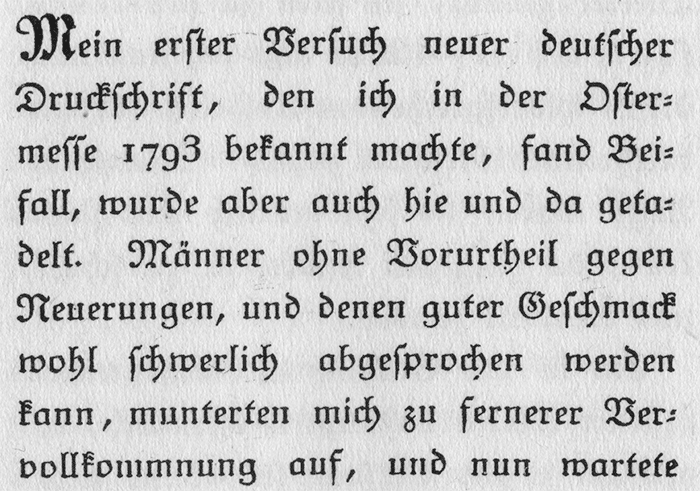
Example of the Unger-Faktur

Johann Friedrich Gottlieb Unger (1753 in Berlin – December 26, 1804 in Berlin) was a German printer and publisher.

He was the fifth son of the printer Johann Georg Unger (October 26, 1715 in Goes bei Pirna – August 15, 1788 in Berlin) and his wife Susanna Katharine (maiden name: Strucken). He took on an apprenticeship at the print shop of the Oberhof printer Georg Jacob Decker. In 1779 Unger requested a print shop for himself and in January 1780 he was granted one. Later, he expanded it to a publishing bookseller, in which he published works by Johann Wolfgang von Goethe, Friedrich Schiller, Friedrich Schleiermacher as well as August and Friedrich Schlegel.

From 1784 onward he attempted repeatedly to gain approval to publish what would have been Berlin’s first daily newspaper. His attempts were rejected as the two existing newspapers in Berlin were found to be sufficient and another newspaper would overload the censors. In 1802 Unger nonetheless became co-owner of the Vossische Zeitung.

In 1793, he invented the "Unger-Fraktur", a type of Fraktur.
