= Shotley Pier =

Pier in Shotley Gate, Suffolk, England

Coordinates: 51°57′14″N 1°16′02″E

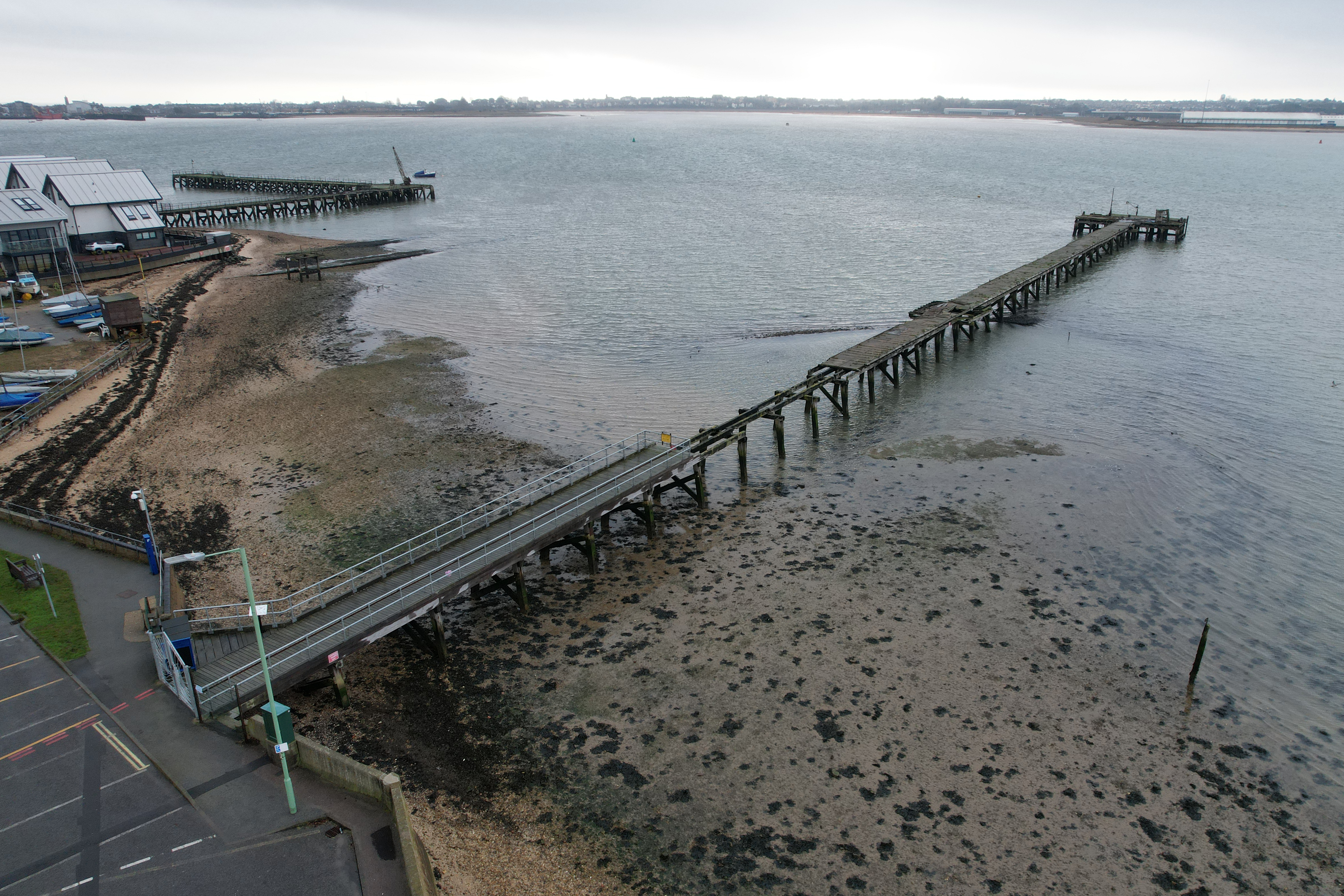
- Shotley Pier in 2026
- Type: Disused railway pier
- Spans: River Stour
- Location: Shotley
- Owner: Shotley Heritage Community Charitable Benefit Society
- Website: www.shotleypier.co.uk

Characteristics
- Construction: Frederick Hervey
- Total length: 540 feet (160 m)

History
- Opening date: 1894

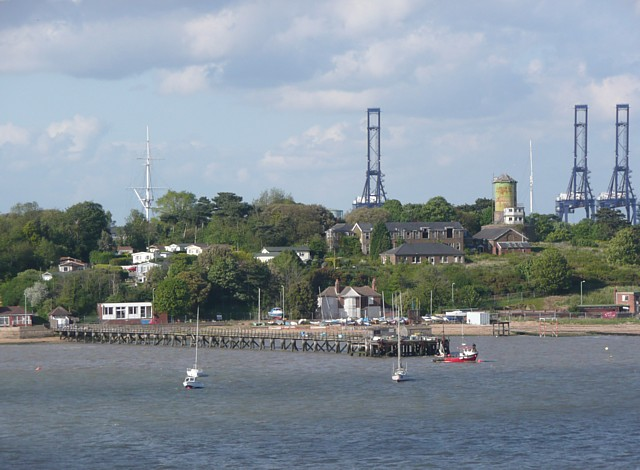
Shotley pier with HMS Ganges and the cranes of Felixtowe port behind it

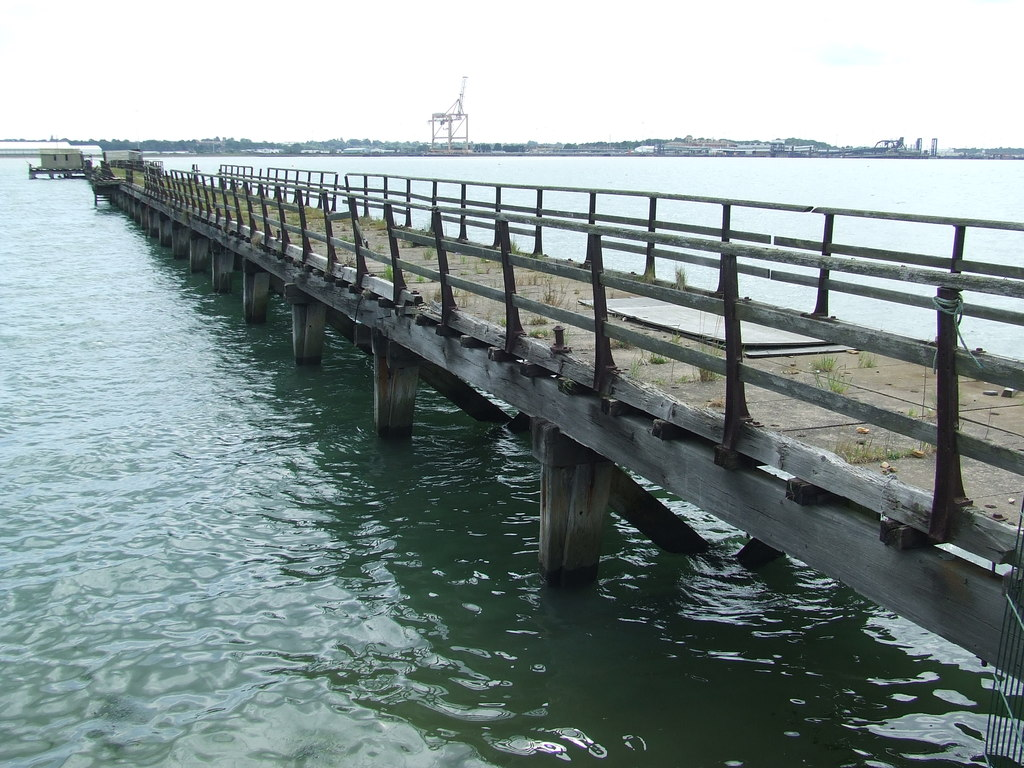
Pier in 2017

Shotley Pier is a disused 540 feet (160 m) long railway pier in Shotley Gate, Shotley, Suffolk. Built in 1894 by Frederick Hervey, 3rd Marquess of Bristol, the structure was used to service a ferry across the River Stour to Harwich, Essex. The ferry carried mail and coal as well as munitions and sailors for the nearby HMS Ganges Royal Navy establishment. During the First World War the structure was used to unload German prisoners of war captured at sea and after the war to moor captured German submarines. The pier was later used by fishermen but has been derelict since the late 1980s. In 2018, the pier was purchased by the Shotley Heritage Community Charitable Benefit Society who have since restored the first 30 metres (98 ft) of the structure.

== Use ==
Shotley Pier was constructed by Frederick Hervey, 3rd Marquess of Bristol in 1894. It was a railway pier, used by the Great Eastern Railway for a ferry connection between Shotley, Suffolk, and Harwich, Essex, across the mouth of the River Stour. Its main cargo was mail and coal as well as munitions and sailors associated with nearby Royal Navy facilities such as the training establishment HMS Ganges in Shotley.

At low water, the river is about 0.5 miles (0.80 km) at this point; mudflats extend around 200 yards (180 m) offshore. The timber pier extends 540 feet (160 m) offshore to a point where the water is 8 feet (2.4 m). The pier measures 10 feet (3.0 m) wide and has a 40 feet (12 m) wide platform at the end. By 2018, two fishermen's huts were located on the end platform. A second pier to the east is shorter with a transverse arm at its end.

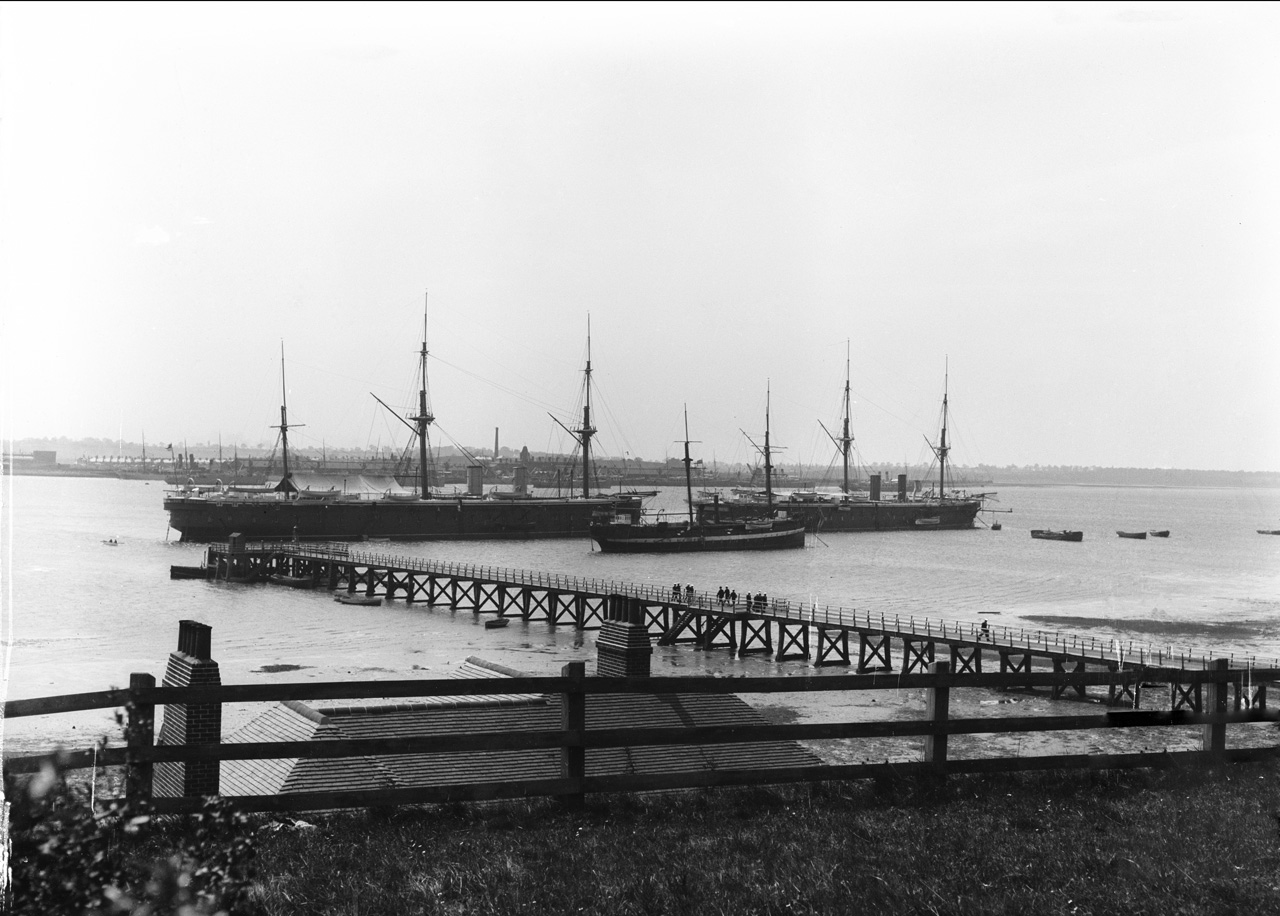
The former HMS Caroline moored off Shotley Pier, 1906

In the early years of the 20th century the training ship HMS Ganges II (the former armoured frigate HMS Agincourt) was anchored off the pier. She was replaced by others Ganges: the former armoured frigate Minotaur and the former sloop Caroline), serving until the 1920s.

During the First World War Shotley Pier was used to land prisoners taken by British Q-ships. After the war more than 300 captured German U-boats (submarines) were kept in the Stour, some of which were moored to the pier. In 1937 Shotley Pier appeared in Arthur Ransome's We Didn't Mean to Go to Sea, part of the Swallows and Amazons series, where the children use it as an anchorage.

Small boat moorings are present just upstream of the pier. On 24 November 1985, a 16 feet (4.9 m) long angling boat was towed to the pier by an inshore lifeboat, having been spotted drifting in the water. On 8 August 2020 an abandoned fibreglass boat was wrecked on the pier.

== Restoration ==
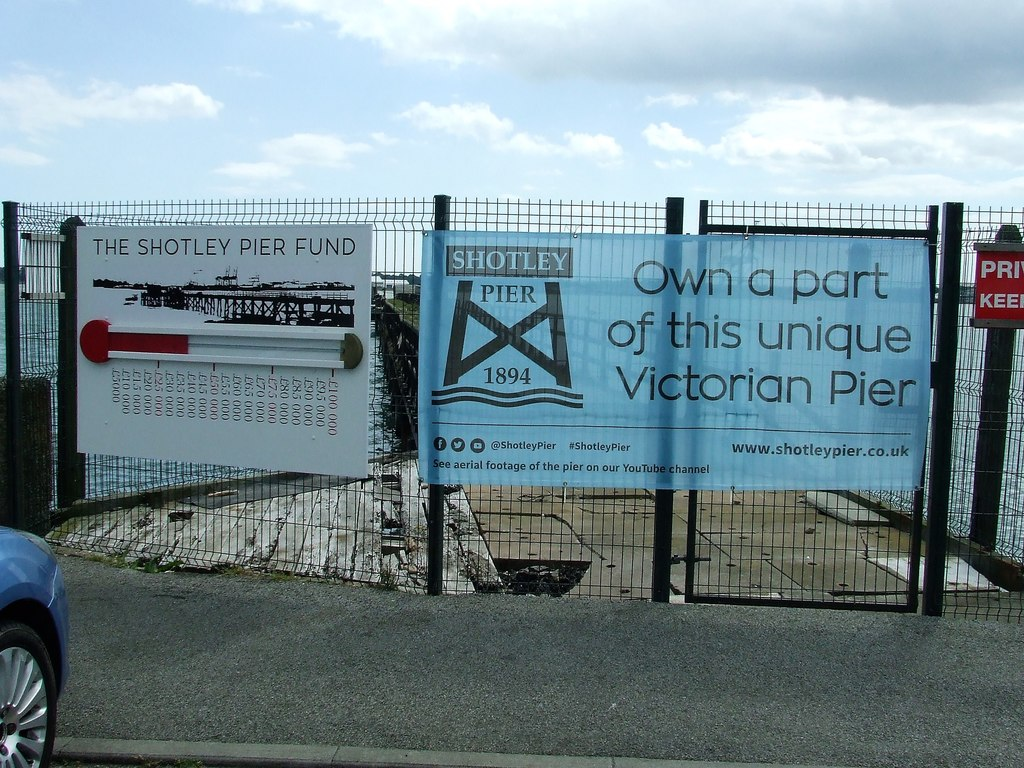
Pier fundraising banners, 2017

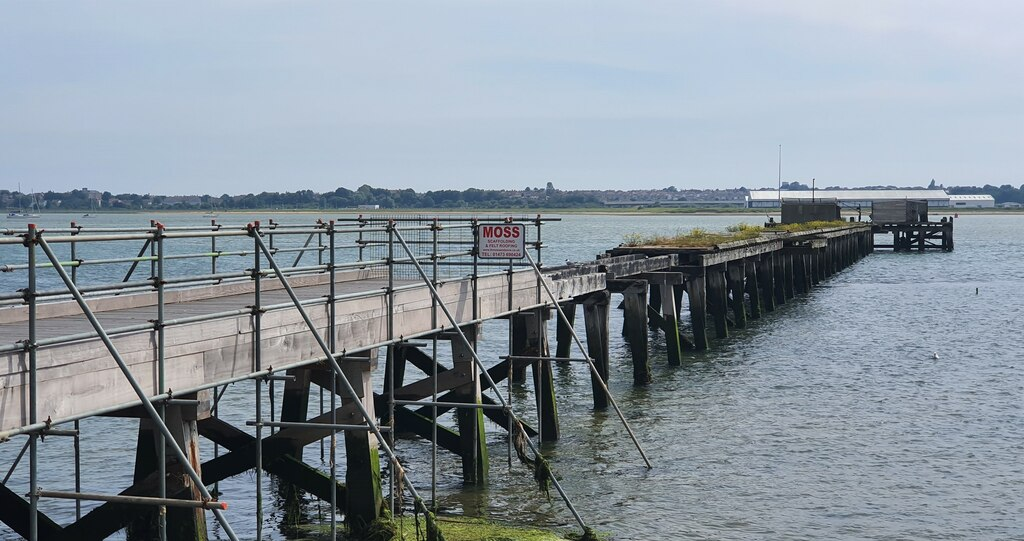
Pier under renovation, 2021

Shotley Pier was purchased by the East Anglian Group in 2012. It was put up for sale by the group in July 2014 with an asking price of £195,000. The pier was described as being in "quite a state" but had planning permission for two food kiosks. In February 2018 the pier was purchased by the Shotley Heritage Community Charitable Benefit Society for £98,000. By this point the pier had been derelict for around 30 years.

The society planned to restore the pier, though their initial planning application was rejected by Babergh District Council in August 2018. A revised proposal was submitted, with toilets and café structures that were said to be more Victorian in appearance. The society asked for sponsors to purchase individual deck planks to help fund the restoration. These cost £100 each and, when installed, included a plaque with the sponsor's name on it. Additional funding came from the Coastal Revival Fund and European Union Rural Development Fund. The initial stage of restoration of the first 30 metres (98 ft) of the pier was completed in 2020.
