= Alton Water =

Reservoir near Ipswich, Suffolk, England

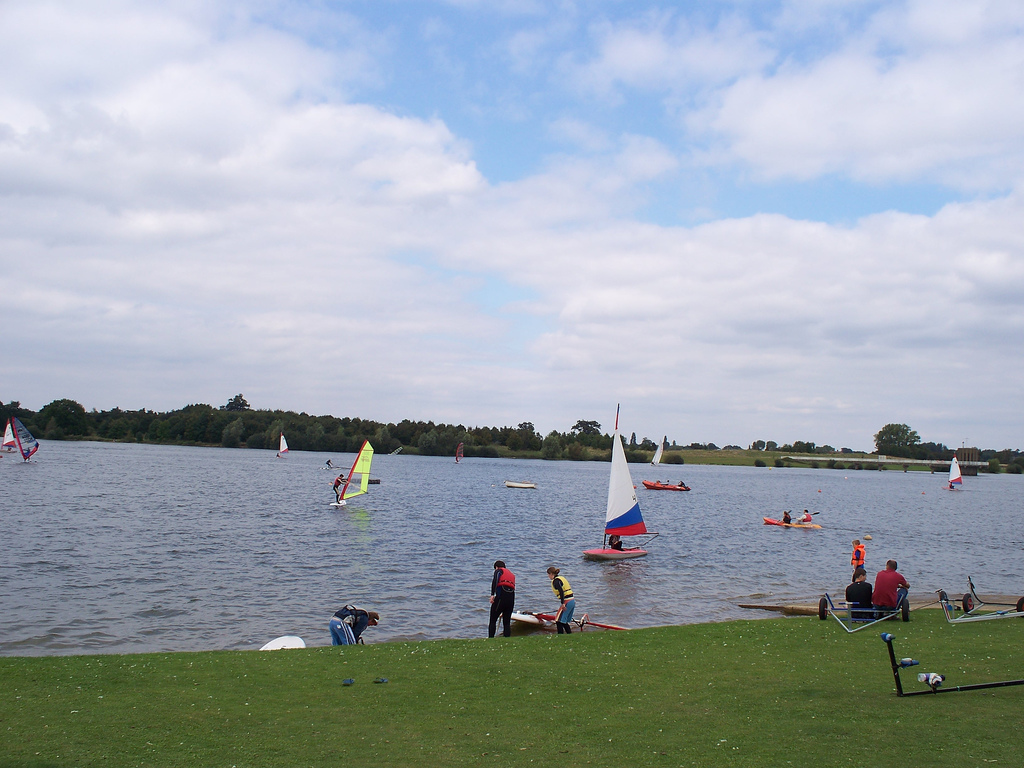
- The reservoir is used for a variety of water sports.

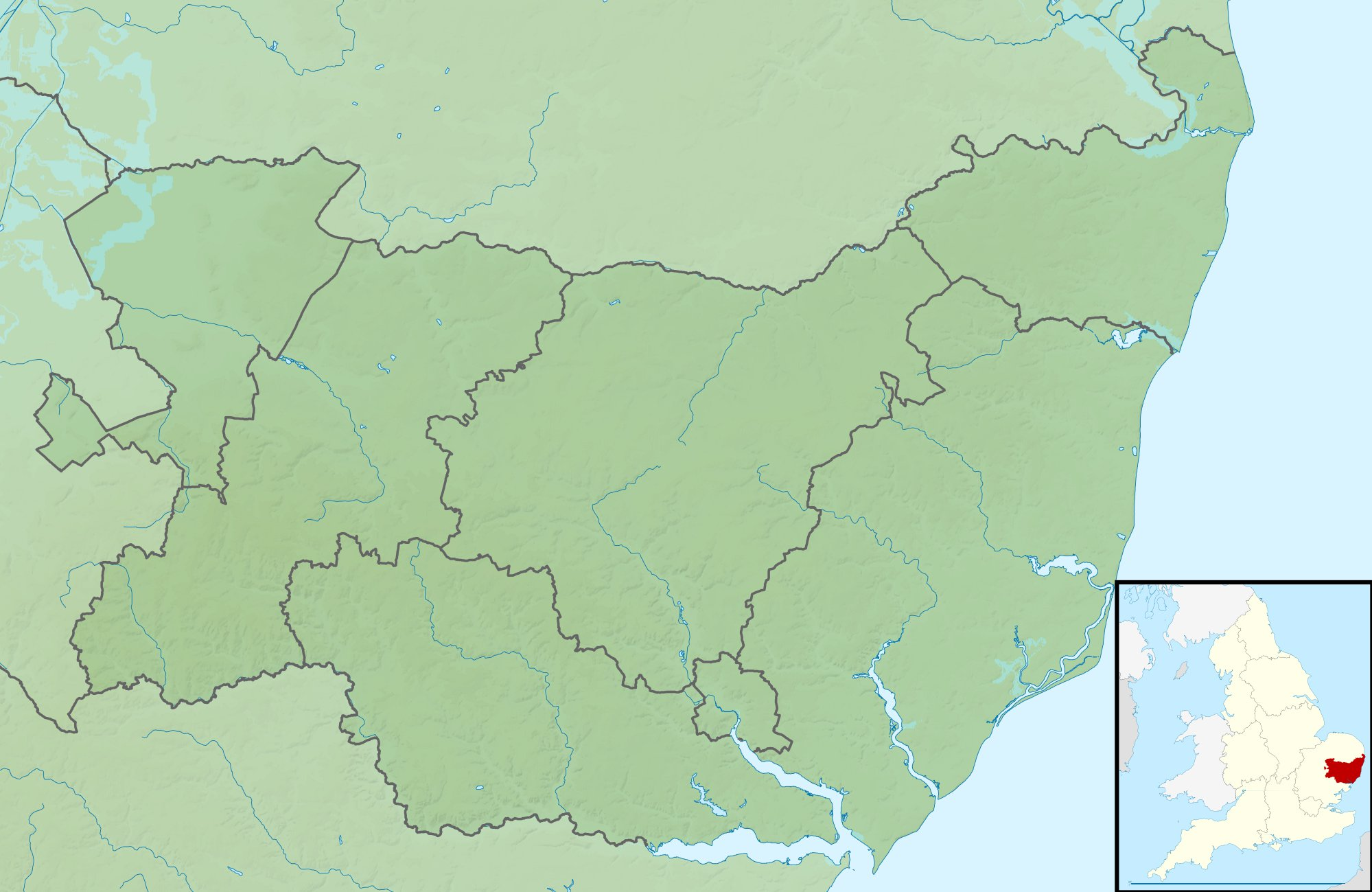
- Location within Suffolk
- Location: Suffolk
- Coordinates: 51°58′50″N 1°8′0″E
- Type: reservoir
- Basin countries: United Kingdom
- Surface area: 400 acres (160 ha)
- Max. depth: 20 m (66 ft)

Alton Water (or Alton Reservoir) is a manmade reservoir located on the Shotley peninsula. It is the largest in Suffolk, with a perimeter of over 8 miles (13 km).

== Construction ==
Due to a shortage of water in the Ipswich area in the 1960s, a list of twenty potential sites for reservoirs was made, with Alton being the chosen site. The land was mainly farmland, but was also home to a mill and Alton Hall. The mill was dismantled and reconstructed at the Museum of East Anglian Life in Stowmarket.

Construction and the filling with water took 13 years to complete. Alton Reservoir was opened in 1987 and is fed from the River Gipping and bore holes on the north side of the River Orwell. The pumping station and treatment works below the dam is capable of treating up to 10 million imperial gallons (45,000 m^{3}) of water a day. Between 85% and 95% of the water goes to Ipswich and Felixstowe via the Wherstead reservoir and the Orwell Bridge with the remainder fed to the villages of the Shotley Peninsula and south Suffolk.

== Uses ==
Other uses include:

- Fishing: in the late 1980s and through the 1990s the reservoir was one of the top match fisheries due to the large shoals of bream and roach.
- Sailing and watersports
- Birdwatching
- Great East Swim: a mass participation open water swim.

== Cultural references ==
- The reservoir is nicknamed "Gitche Gumee" by a character in the Strong Winds trilogy of children's novels by British writer Julia Jones.
