= G. C. Cayley =

Royal Navy Admiral and Royal Air Force officer (1866–1944)

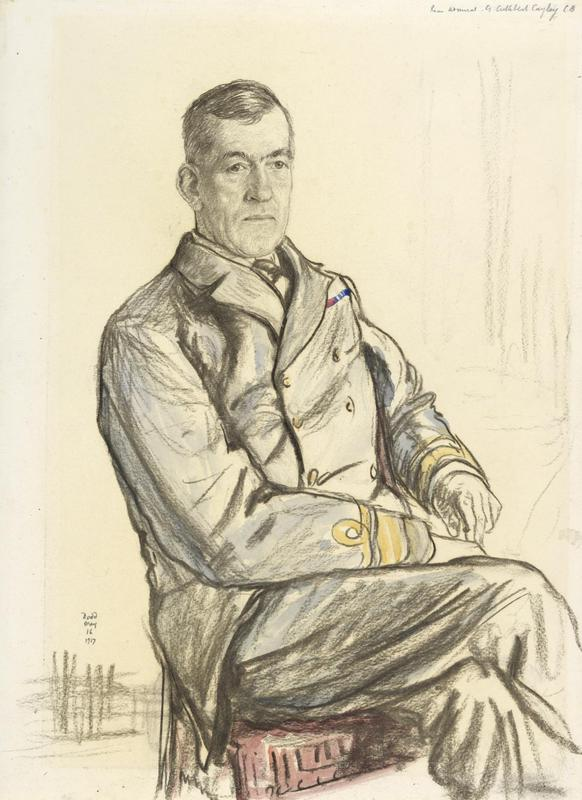
Rear-Admiral G. C. Cayley, sketched in 1917, by Francis Dodd.

Admiral George Cuthbert Cayley, CB (30 August 1866 – 21 December 1944) was a British senior Royal Navy and Royal Air Force officer.

Joining the Royal Navy in 1880, he commanded the boys' training ship HMS St Vincent (1904–1906), HMS Blake (1907), and HMS Minotaur (1910–1913). During the First World War, he served as commodore-in-charge and then rear admiral-in-charge of HMS Ganges, a boys' training establishment in Shotley. On 1 April 1918, he joined the newly created Royal Air Force (RAF) as a major-general, and served as General Officer Commanding (GOC) No 5 Area and then GOC North Western Area. He relinquished his temporary commission in the RAF on 4 April 1919 and was placed on the retired list of the Royal Navy on 18 July 1919. He continued to be promoted while on the retired list, being made an admiral in November 1926.

In the 1916 King's Birthday Honours, he was appointed a Companion of the Order of the Bath (CB) in recognition of services during the First World War. He was also appointed an Officer of the Légion d'honneur by the President of France "for distinguished services rendered during the War".

== See also ==
- Harwich Force
