= Shotley Gate =

Coordinates: 51.957856°N 1.2687452°E

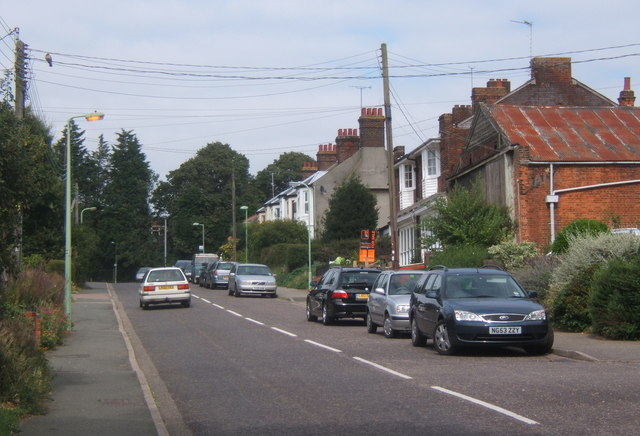

- Location within Suffolk
- Area: 0.4900 km^{2} (0.1892 sq mi)
- Population: 1,461 (2020 estimate)
  - Density: 2,982/km^{2} (7,720/sq mi)
- Civil parish: Shotley
- District: Babergh
- Shire county: Suffolk
- Region: East
- Country: England
- Sovereign state: United Kingdom
- Post town: IPSWICH
- Postcode district: IP9
- Dialling code: 01473
- UK Parliament: South Suffolk

Shotley Gate is a settlement in the civil parish of Shotley, in the Babergh district, in the county of Suffolk, England. It is located at the tip of Shotley Peninsula and is the largest settlement in the parish of Shotley, in 2020 it had an estimated population of 1461. Shotley Gate has a pub called the Bristol Arms (formerly the Shotley Gate Inn) the settlement of Shotley Gate developed either side of Bristol Hill.

The Stour immediately south of the settlement and opposite Bathside Bay, Harwich, is a possible location for the first of the two Battles of the River Stour in 885.

Shotley Gate and the parish have a strategic position for protecting the ports of Felixstowe, Harwich and Ipswich and in 1865 the Shotley Battery fortifications were established.

King Edward III camped here early in the Hundred Years War, before the great sea Battle of Sluys. Documents signed by him and kept in the National Archive end with the words "at Shotley".

Shotley Gate also harbours HMS Ganges, a former Royal Navy training establishment (RNTE Shotley) for boys. The teak ship was constructed in 1821 and taken out of service in 1861. It was moved to Shotley in 1899, and by 1905 was moved ashore. A large proportion of the naval ratings of the 20th century, boy entrants in peacetime and men during both World Wars, trained there. The training establishment closed in 1976 and the site was subsequently sold for redevelopment. In June 2011 Babergh District Council declared the site a Conservation Area.

The HMS Ganges Museum (open Saturdays, Sundays and Bank Holidays between Easter and the end of October 1100 to 1700hrs) houses artefacts and memorabilia from the old shore establishment including a large collection of photographs and original documents.
