= Shotley Battery =

- Shotley, Suffolk; England

Site information
- Open to the public: No
- Condition: Part demolished

Location
- Coordinates: 51.958°N 1.274°E

Site history
- Built: 1863-65
- Materials: Brick; Earth

Shotley Battery was built in 1865 on the Shotley Peninsula to guard the port of Felixstowe, within HMS Ganges Naval Training school, on the same site as an existing Martello Tower.

== History ==
It was built with seven sides using brick and earth. It was surrounded with a dry ditch and had three magazines. Originally armed with 14 68-pounder guns, these were replaced 14 7-inch RML guns. It was modified with two positions for 10-inch Rifled Muzzle Loading (RML) guns in 1891. These were used until 1901.

The battery was then disarmed and transferred to the Admiralty in 1904 as part of a shore training establishment HMS Ganges. It has suffered much damage since HMS Ganges closed in 1976 and became a police training centre which has in turn closed.
