= Listed buildings in Shotley =

Civil Parish in Suffolk, England

Shotley is a village and civil parish in the Babergh District of Suffolk, England. It contains 15 listed buildings that are recorded in the National Heritage List for England. Of these one is grade II* and 14 are grade II.

This list is based on the information retrieved online from Historic England.

== Key ==
| Grade | Criteria |
|---|---|
| I | Buildings that are of exceptional interest |
| II* | Particularly important buildings of more than special interest |
| II | Buildings that are of special interest |

== Listing ==
| Name | Grade | Location | Type | Completed (Note: The date given is the date used by Historic England as significant for the initial building or that of an important part in the structure's description.) | Date designated | Grid ref. (Note: The grid reference is based on the British national grid reference system, sometimes known as OSGB36, used by the Ordnance Survey.) Geo-coordinates | Notes | Entry number (Note: The "List Entry Number" is a unique number assigned to each listed building and scheduled monument by Historic England.) | Image | Wikidata |
|---|---|---|---|---|---|---|---|---|---|---|
| Swimming Pool at Former Hms Ganges | II | Caledonia Road, Shotley Gate, Ipswich, IP9 1QP | | | 18 August 2023 | TM2490734049; 51°57′34″N 1°16′19″E | | 1486617 | Upload Photo | Q126688922 |
| Arwarton Hall Farmhouse | II | Chelmondiston Road | | | 22 February 1955 | TM2243435694; 51°58′31″N 1°14′14″E | | 1036851 | Upload Photo | Q26288529 |
| Barn Approximately 70 Metres North West of Shotley Hall and Attached Cartlodge | II | Church Walk | | | 22 February 1955 | TM2313636170; 51°58′45″N 1°14′52″E | | 1036853 | Upload Photo | Q26288531 |
| Church of St Mary | II* | Church Walk | church building | | 22 February 1955 | TM2370136021; 51°58′39″N 1°15′21″E | | 1194504 | Church of St Mary More images | Q17533989 |
| Shotley Hall | II | Church Walk | | | 22 February 1955 | TM2320036130; 51°58′44″N 1°14′55″E | | 1036852 | Upload Photo | Q26288530 |
| Gates, Gatepiers, Railings and Lamp Standards, the 'main Gate', at Hms Ganges | II | Gatepiers, Railings And Lamp Standards, The 'main Gate', At Hms Ganges, Caledonia Road | | | 7 February 2005 | TM2478633861; 51°57′28″N 1°16′13″E | | 1393785 | Upload Photo | Q26672928 |
| Ceremonial Mast of the Former Hms Ganges, Royal Naval Training Establishment | II | Royal Naval Training Establishment, Bristol Hill | | | 23 February 1989 | TM2485133880; 51°57′28″N 1°16′16″E | | 1036850 | Upload Photo | Q108619735 |
| North Martello Tower Approximately 500 Metres East of Bristol Hill on the Site of the Former Hms Ganges, Royal Naval Training Establishment | II | Royal Naval Training Establishment, Bristol Hill | Martello tower | | 23 February 1989 | TM2513134147; 51°57′37″N 1°16′31″E | | 1194492 | North Martello Tower Approximately 500 Metres East of Bristol Hill on the Site of the Former Hms Ganges, Royal Naval Training Establishment More images | Q17641272 |
| South Martello Tower Approximately 200 Metres East of Bristol Hill on the Site of Former Hms Ganges, Royal Naval Training Establishment | II | Royal Naval Training Establishment, Bristol Hill | Martello tower | | 23 February 1989 | TM2482933656; 51°57′21″N 1°16′14″E | | 1351654 | South Martello Tower Approximately 200 Metres East of Bristol Hill on the Site of Former Hms Ganges, Royal Naval Training Establishment More images | Q17641269 |
| Nether Hall | II | The Street, IP9 1PW | | | 22 February 1955 | TM2438134714; 51°57′56″N 1°15′54″E | | 1194555 | Upload Photo | Q26489176 |
| Over Hall | II | The Street | | | 22 February 1955 | TM2437634741; 51°57′57″N 1°15′53″E | | 1036854 | Upload Photo | Q26288532 |
| Rose Farmhouse | II | The Street | | | 23 February 1989 | TM2364035100; 51°58′10″N 1°15′16″E | | 1285614 | Upload Photo | Q26574292 |
| Charity Farmhouse | II | Wades Lane | | | 23 February 1989 | TM2325236640; 51°59′00″N 1°14′59″E | | 1194619 | Upload Photo | Q26489237 |
| Hill House | II | Wades Lane | | | 23 February 1989 | TM2383036750; 51°59′03″N 1°15′29″E | | 1036856 | Upload Photo | Q26288534 |
| Red House Farmhouse | II | Wades Lane | | | 22 February 1955 | TM2240436792; 51°59′06″N 1°14′15″E | | 1036855 | Upload Photo | Q26288533 |

== See also ==
- Grade I listed buildings in Suffolk
- Grade II* listed buildings in Suffolk

== Sources ==
- Bettely, James; Pevsner, Nikolaus (2015) [1961], Suffolk: West, The Buildings of England, New Haven and London: Yale University Press, ISBN 978-0-300-19655-9
