= HMS Ganges mast =

Beached mast

Coordinates: 51°57′28.5″N 1°16′16.3″E

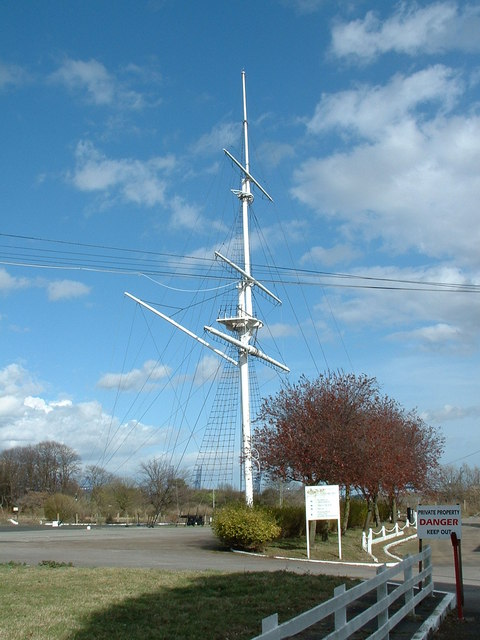
Mast pictured in 2004

A ship's mast stands on the site of the Royal Navy shore establishment HMS Ganges at Shotley, Suffolk in England. It was formerly used for mast climbing practice when the site was a training centre for boy seamen. Every boy at the school had to climb partway up the mast to qualify. On ceremonial occasions the mast would be manned by a team of boys standing on various parts. The one who stood on the truck at the top was known as a "button boy". In 1928 one of the boys climbing the mast died after falling and missing the safety net at its base. Ganges closed in 1976 and the mast afterwards fell into disuse, though it is a grade II listed structure. The mast was restored in 2022-2023 as part of the redevelopment of the Ganges for housing.

== Establishment ==
The Royal Naval Training Establishment Shotley (known within the Royal Navy as HMS Ganges) was established in southern Suffolk in 1905. The 142-foot-high (43 m) mast was erected in 1907.

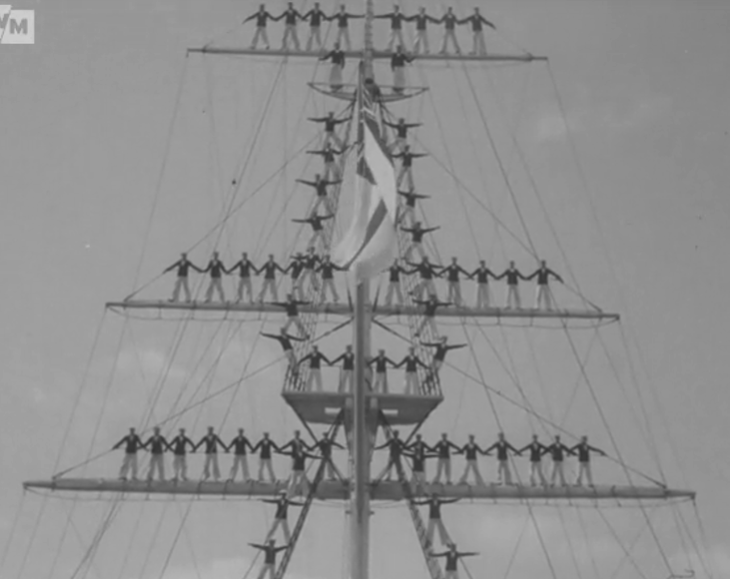
Manning the mast for the visit of the Duke of Edinburgh, May 1956. A white ensign flies from the gaff in the foreground.

The mast consists of three separate portions, that are stepped (overlapped) where they join. The lower portion is a riveted iron mainmast extending some 75 feet (23 m) above ground and a reputed 8 metres (26 ft) below ground. It is reported to have been taken from the lower section of the foremast of the corvette Cordelia which was sold for breaking up in 1904. This portion is original to the 1907 erection of the mast, though it has had numerous later fixings welded to it.

Above the mainmast is a woodentop mast of 47.5 feet (14.5 m) length, reputed to have been the topmast of Agincourt, a former frigate which had served as a training vessel at the former Ganges establishment in Harwich. A 2017 survey noted that the fittings on this section looked to be original to 1907, but that it unlikely that the wooden mast would have survived from this date and may have been replaced or repaired since. The upper section is the wooden topgallant mast of 45 feet (14 m) length. The origin of this portion is not known but it does not match the topmast, being substantially smaller in diameter and having to be altered to fit.

The mast carries three yards and a gaff. The lowest, the course yard, is 70.25 feet (21.41 m) in length and dates from 1955 when the original yard from Cordelia was replaced. Some of the fittings from the original yard were transferred to the replacement yard. The topsail yard is 56.5 feet (17.2 m) in length and was reported to have been replaced in 1955, but may have been replaced again in 1988. The topgallant yard is 43 feet (13 m) and is also reported to date from 1955. The gaff measures 49 feet (15 m) and was made new at Chatham dockyard in 1961.

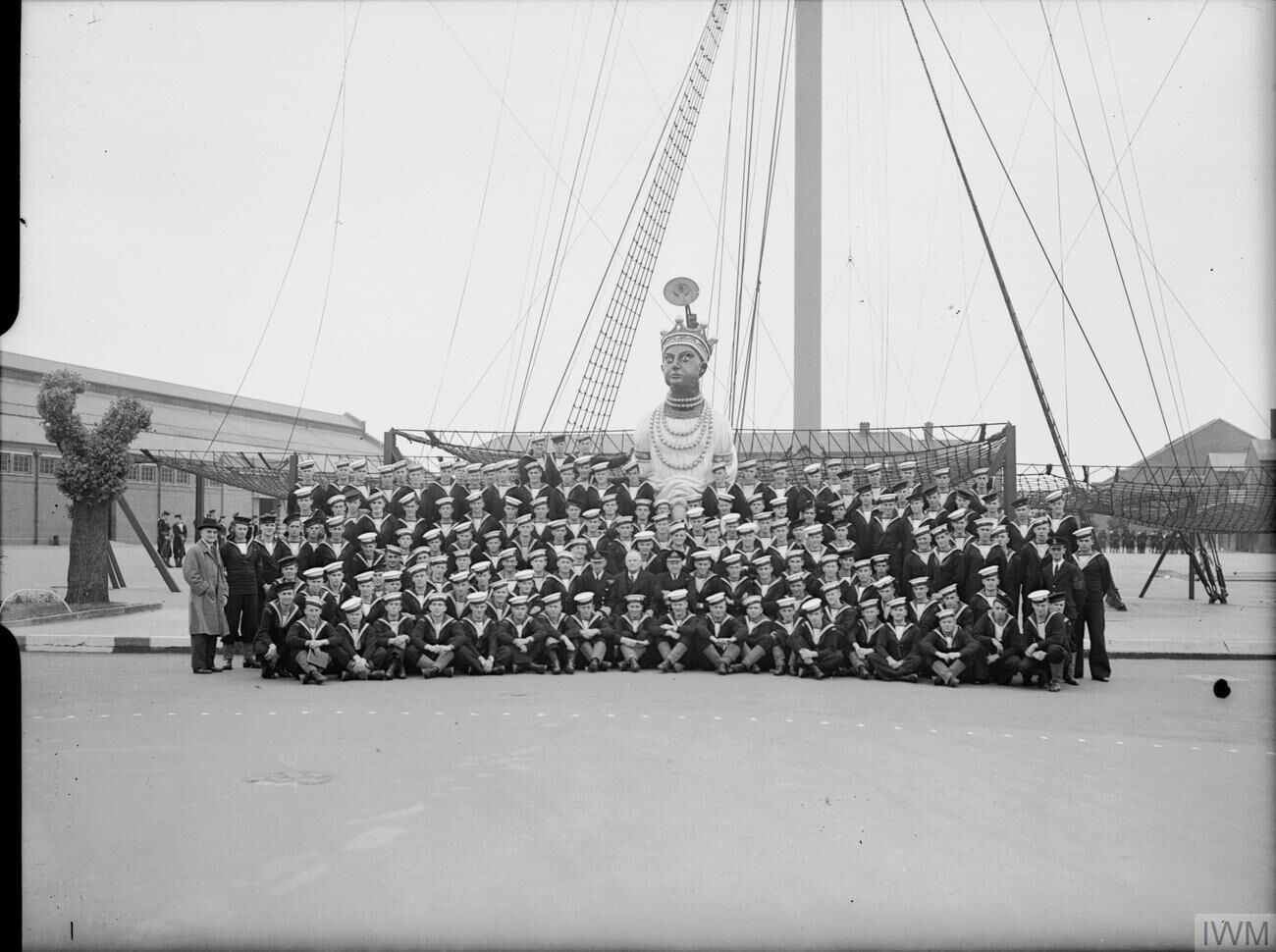
A class of New Zealanders in front of the mast and figurehead in 1944

A top platform is located just above the lowest yard where the first step in the mast occurs. A half-moon platform was present at the second step just below the top-most yard. A 12-inch (30 cm) diameter truck was located at the very top of the mast; at Ganges this later became known as the button. The mast is rigged with galvanised steel wire. The mast stood adjacent to the asphalt parade ground and the "Indian Prince" figurehead of the former second-rate ship-of-the-line Ganges was installed near its base.

== Use in training ==
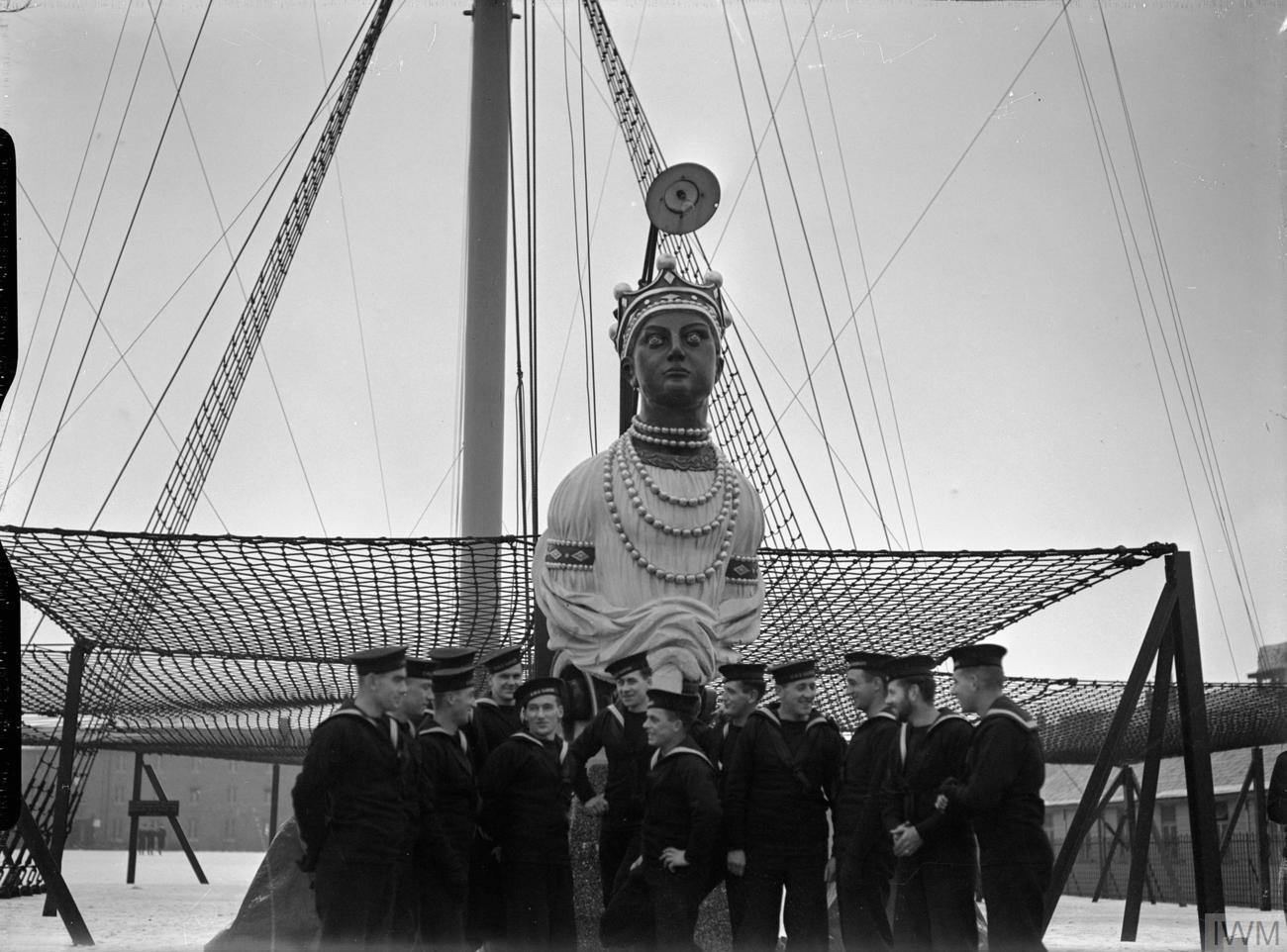
Detail from 1944, showing safety net

The mast was used as part of the training for 15-18 year old boy seamen. Each boy at Ganges was required to ascend, at least once, to the top platform (ie. the lowest platform on the mast), a height of 60 feet (18 m). This required a climb by the inclined ratlines to a point near where the lowest yard crossed the mast where the boy transferred to the outward leaning futtock shrouds to reach the edge of the platform, which protruded 10 feet (3.0 m) from the mast. Once there they would have to hoist themselves up and over the platform edge, a point known as the "devil's elbow". The platform contained doors which allowed access by the ratlines, without passing the devil's elbow. These doors (sometimes known as "[land] lubber's holes") were locked shut on the side that boys ascended the mast but open on the opposite side to allow them to descend by the ratlines alone. A safety net was present at the base of the mast to catch any boys who fell.

Outside of the compulsory training exercise, boys were free to ascend the mast as a leisure activity or could join the team who manned the yards for ceremonial occasions. On such occasions one boy would be selected to stand on the button, reached by means of a 15-foot (4.6 m) climb up the mast itself from the top gallant trestle tree and by use of the 2-foot-6-inch (0.76 m) lightning conductor as a handhold. Those selected were known as "button boys" and received a coin from the commander of Ganges.

== Fatality ==
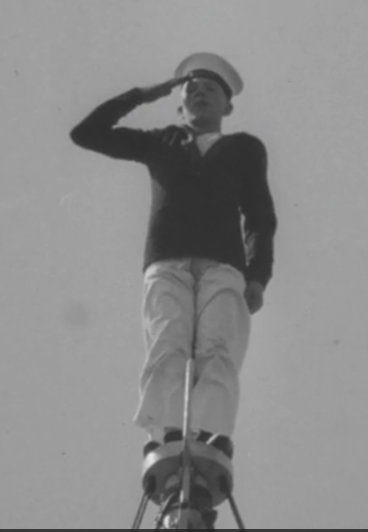
A button boy, May 1956

At 3:15 pm on 6 October 1928, 15-year-old boy seaman Alfred Hickman fell to his death from the mast. Hickman was using the mast during leisure time with a number of other boys and was attempting to make his first climb to the button. He fell and grabbed a rope to restrain his fall. Hickman suffered a bad friction burn and released the rope, which carried him beyond the edge of the safety net, falling to the ground. An orphan with no known family, he was buried by the navy at St Mary's Church, Shotley.

The accident was mentioned in the House of Commons by Labour MP Ernest Thurtle who questioned, in light of the death, whether mast climbing remained an essential part of naval training in the era of steamships. The Conservative government's First Lord of the Admiralty William Bridgeman replied that he was aware of the incident and was considering if additional precautions should be taken. Labour MP and former RN lieutenant-commander, Joseph Kenworthy asked that mast climbing not be reduced as he considered the Navy already carried out too much infantry drill. Bridgeman replied that he had yet to investigate the accident.

The navy continued to use mast climbing at Ganges until its closure in 1976 and the mast was last manned on 6 June. The Royal Navy Communications Branch Museum notes that no other boys, of the estimated 150,000 who climbed the mast, died and found no record of any serious injuries being sustained.

== Later history ==
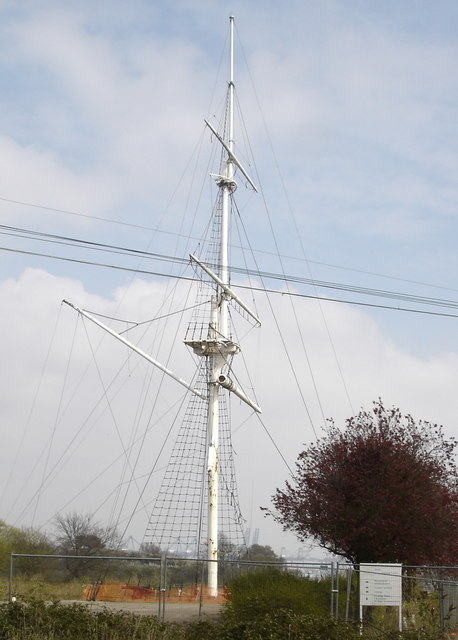
Dilapidated mast pictured in 2009

The topgallant mast and all the yards were renewed in 1955, with new elements made at Chatham Dockyard, it was afterwards noted to measure 142 feet (43 m) from ground to button. The gaff was renewed in 1961 with new parts, again sourced from Chatham. TV presenter John Noakes climbed the mast and reached the top gallant trestle tree in 1967 for an episode of Blue Peter.

The Royal Navy closed Ganges in 1976 and the figurehead was relocated to the Royal Hospital School, a school in the Royal Navy tradition at nearby Holbrook. The Shotley site was used as a police training centre from 1988 to 1999 though from this time the mast fell into disrepair with the upper portions becoming rotten. It has been described as "the best-known landmark on the Shotley peninsula for generations". It was granted protection as a Grade II listed building on 23 February 1989.

The Shotley site has been earmarked for redevelopment. In October 2017 a developer proposed to restore the mast as part of 300-house development. They proposed to use the same contractors who worked on the Cutty Sark restoration. Babergh District council approved the plans in 2020 but the works were delayed by the COVID-19 pandemic. The last parts of the wooden upper sections were taken away for restoration on 6 June 2022. TS Rigging in Maldon, Essex, carried out the restoration and the upper portions were reinstalled in August 2023.
