= Robert Clive (disambiguation) =

Robert Clive (1725–1774), also known as Clive of India, was the first British Governor of the Bengal Presidency.

Robert Clive may also refer to:

- Robert Clive (1769–1833), MP for Ludlow, son of Clive of India
- Robert Clive (1789–1854) (Robert Henry Clive), British politician, grandson of Clive of India
- Robert Clive (diplomat) (Robert Henry Clive, 1877–1948), British diplomat
- Robert Clive, launched as HMS Beckford, a patrol boat

== See also ==
- Robert Windsor-Clive (disambiguation)
