= Ganges Wood =

Woodland near Shotley Gate, Suffolk, England

- Location within Suffolk
- Interactive map of Ganges Wood

Geography
- Location: Suffolk, England
- Coordinates: 51.960°N 1.264°E
- Area: 2.21 hectares (5.46 acres)

Administration
- Authority: Woodland Trust

Ganges Wood is a woodland in Suffolk, England, near the village of Shotley Gate. It covers a total area of 2.21 hectares (5.46 acres). It is owned and managed by the Woodland Trust.
