= HMS Beckford =

- HMS Beckford in renamed guise as HMS Dee, 1972

History

United Kingdom
- Builder: Yarrow
- Launched: 27 April 1955
- Name: HMS Beckford (P3104)
- Namesake: Beckford, Worcestershire
- Operator: Royal Navy
- Name: HMS Dee (P3104)
- Namesake: River Dee
- Operator: Royal Navy Mersey Division, Royal Naval Reserve
- Name: Robert Clive (1968-1969)
- Operator: (United Kingdom) Plessey Group
- Name: HMS Dee (P3104) (1969-1984)
- Operator: Royal Navy Mersey Division, Royal Naval Reserve
- Out of service: 1982
- Name: Beckford (1984-)
- Operator: (United Kingdom) Pounds Marine Shipping
- Homeport: Harwich
- Fate: Broken up in 2017

General characteristics
- Class & type: Ford-class seaward defence boat
- Displacement: 120 tons standard; 160 tons full load
- Length: 117 ft 3 in (35.74 m)
- Beam: 20 ft (6.1 m)
- Draught: 6 ft 6 in (1.98 m)
- Propulsion: 1 × Foden diesel (Centre shaft); 2 × Paxman 12YHAX 550hp Diesels (Outer shafts)
- Speed: 16 knots
- Complement: 19
- Armament: 1 × 40 mm anti-aircraft gun; 2 × 20 mm anti aircraft guns

HMS Beckford (P3104) was one of 20 Ford-class patrol boats built for the Royal Navy in the 1950s.

Their names were all chosen from villages ending in -ford. This boat was named after Beckford, Worcestershire.

Beckford was launched on 27 April 55. She was later renamed HMS Dee whilst serving as the training tender to the Mersey Division of the Royal Naval Reserve. In 1968 the vessel was chartered by the Plessey Group and renamed Robert Clive, then returned as HMS Dee to the RNR in January 1969. She was the tender to Liverpool University Royal Naval Unit from 1970 undertaking weekend training trips to Anglesey, the Isle of Man and surrounding areas during term time and longer voyages during the Easter and Summer vacations when destinations included Norway, Paris, Western Isles etc. including at least two transits of Loch Ness. She was placed on the disposals list in 1982 and sold to Pounds Marine Shipping in 1984. She was fitted with schooner rig and was anchored off Shotley, Suffolk in Harwich harbour for many years. In 2017, after being beached at Harwich, she was removed and broken up at Lowestoft by East Point Metal Trading Ltd.

== In popular culture ==
=== HMS Beckfoot ===
Beckford was an inspiration for the fictional vessel HMS Beckfoot (also called Hispaniola and Pride of Macau) in the Strong Winds trilogy of children's books by Julia Jones.
