= John's Campaign =

British campaign on hospital visiting rights

John's Campaign is a British campaign for extended visiting rights for family carers of patients with dementia in hospitals and care homes in the United Kingdom.

== History ==
The campaign was founded on 30 November 2014 by the writers Nicci Gerrard and Julia Jones. Behind its simple statement of purpose lies the belief that carers should not just be allowed but should be welcomed, and that a collaboration between the patients and all connected with them is crucial to their health and their well-being.

Alistair Burns, the national clinical director for dementia and mental health in older people with NHS England, said: "We would encourage hospital trusts, as part of the care they provide to individuals with dementia and their families, to consider facilitating an approach whereby the families and carers of people with dementia can support them fully while they are in hospital."

In February 2014 Nicci Gerrard's father Dr John Gerrard, aged 86, spent five weeks in hospital for the treatment of leg ulcers. He suffered from Alzheimer's disease and his family's visiting was severely restricted because of a combination of normal "visiting hours" and an infectious outbreak. His condition deteriorated dramatically while he was in hospital; having previously been living well with Alzheimers he became "skeletal, incontinent, immobile, incoherent" and needed 24-hour care. He died in November 2014. His family believe that the lack of contact with familiar people and the lack of the individual attention they would have given him contributed significantly to his deterioration. In November 2014 Nicci Gerrard wrote an article in The Observer after her father's death, the following week's issue featured several supportive letters, and the campaign developed thereafter.

An Early Day Motion was put before the UK Parliament in December 2014 with the title "John's Campaign and the right to stay with dementia patients in hospital."

The campaign has received coverage including the April 2015 edition of the Alzheimer's Society's magazine Living with Dementia and BBC Radio 4's You and Yours consumer programme on 29 April 2015.

In March 2016 it was announced that the campaign had been endorsed by the NHS and that trusts would be encouraged "to consider facilitating an approach whereby the families and carers of people with dementia can support them fully while they are in hospital".

== Care homes and COVID-19 ==
During the 2020 COVID-19 pandemic, John's Campaign became concerned about the restrictions on visits to residents of care homes in England. In July 2020 John's Campaign was the lead signatory of a letter to the Secretary of State describing "The hidden catastrophe that is taking place in care homes" and stating that "there has [...] been much suffering and a deterioration in mental and physical health among many of the residents because of the ban on all visitors". In September 2020 the campaign launched legal action to challenge the restrictions.

The campaign was a core participant in the UK COVID-19 Inquiry.

== Recognition ==
Julia Jones was awarded a British Empire Medal in the 2023 Birthday Honours; she was described as "Co-founder, John's Campaign", and the award was for "Services to People with Dementia".
