= Strong Winds series =

Book series by Julia Jones

Strong Winds
- Book covers of the Strong Winds trilogy: The Salt-stained Book, A Ravelled Flag, Ghosting Home.
- Author: Julia Jones
- Country: UK
- Language: English

The Strong Winds series is a series of children's books written by English author Julia Jones. The books reference many of the settings and characters of the Swallows and Amazons series by Arthur Ransome. The books use adventure stories about sailing to provide action and structure amid developing themes of foster care, mental illness, disability and corrupt officialdom.

== Plot summary ==
=== Volume 1 The Salt-stained Book ===
Donny Walker (aged 13) and his deaf mother Skye travel in a campervan to Shotley to meet Donny's long-lost great-aunt Ellen. Following a car accident authorities place Donny in foster care and his mother in a psychiatric hospital. Donny forms friendships with local children, "discovers his inborn prowess as a sailor" and evades a local police officer to find his great-aunt.

=== Volume 2 A Ravelled Flag ===
Donny and his growing number of allies are still battling the school and social services, but what first appeared to be immovable bureaucracy is gradually revealed to be criminal malice. Some of the first episode's villains are developed as actively conspiring against heroes Donny and Skye, with the motive of exploiting illegal immigrants.

=== Volume 3 Ghosting Home ===
In the conclusion Donny becomes aware that a mysterious red-and-white schooner is a serious threat to his family. Meanwhile, fourteen-year-old Min leaves his village in China on the first part of a journey which he hopes will take him to England in search of his mother who left the village seven years before.

=== Volume 4 The Lion of Sole Bay ===
In this un-numbered sequel, previous minor character Luke was planning to spend a school vacation with his father restoring an old fishing boat but his father is seriously injured in a boatyard accident. Meanwhile, interest among boat-mooring neighbours in a Suffolk pub sign originally from a warship captured in the Battle of Sole Bay in 1672 shows that historic animosity between the English and the Dutch hasn't entirely worked itself out.

=== Volume 5 Black Waters ===
Xanthe Ribiero is in hiding. She has made an unforgiving enemy and has taken refuge on a redundant lightship in the Essex marshes. The river Blackwater sparkles in the early summer sun and the weather is set fair for sailing, but the children Xanthe has come to teach are oddly fearful – as if they are in hiding too.

=== Volume 6 Pebble ===
Liam's home life is complicated; he struggles to protect his family against unseen dangers but a half-term trip up the Suffolk coast in the Chinese junk Strong Winds triggers a series of events.

=== Volume 7 Voyage North ===
The setting is aboard a Russian oligarch’s superyacht off Norway, and the status of Donny’s foes has similarly grown, from the suspect social worker and bullying policeman of The Salt-Stained Book to include the Russian President.

== Settings ==
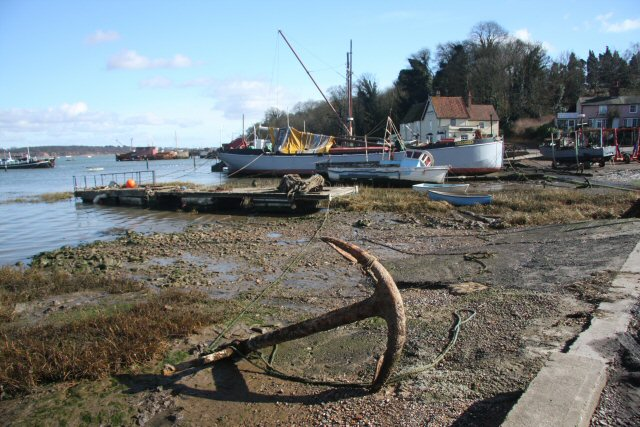
Pin Mill, near Ipswich, is a setting for much of the action in the trilogy.

Locations for the narrative include Leeds and Colchester; Pin Mill, Alton Water, River Deben and Shotley, Suffolk; Lowestoft, Zeebrugge.

== Creating the series ==
In 2006, while working on a PhD thesis, Julia Jones decided to become a writer of adventure stories like the Swallows and Amazons series of Arthur Ransome she had read as a child. The Salt-Stained Book, the first part of a planned trilogy, was released in June 2011. Jones hoped the trilogy would "inspire a new generation of children to mess about in boats." A fourth book followed the original trilogy, to make it a 'series'.

== Allusion ==
The books contain frequent allusion to Arthur Ransome's Swallows and Amazons series as well as other works, particularly R.L. Stevenson's Treasure Island and Henry Wadsworth Longfellow's 1855 poem The Song of Hiawatha.

== Critical reception ==
Cassandra Jardine, reviewing for The Daily Telegraph, wrote "The Salt-Stained Book... is not just a homage to the Swallows and Amazons stories. Donny and Anna, Jones's fictional characters, live in the contemporary world, escaping social workers, rather than pirates. There's far more emotion than in Ransome's books" but "they share the same confident, risk-taking spirit..." Amanda Craig, reviewing The Salt-stained Book for The Times "...wasn't sure about the historical framing device that gives the novel its title..." but wrote "Among so many children's books that seem machine-tooled, Jones's novel feels like a hand-crafted toy, whose occasional wonkiness only adds to its appeal."

John Wilson, reviewing A Ravelled Flag in the Otago Daily Times described the frequent allusions to Ransome, writing "the writer's skill is evident in the constant references not being too leaden in their effect" while Dennis Hamley, for Armadillo magazine commented "All authors, whether consciously or not, are writing in a tradition. Now and again it is overt so that a book becomes a conscious homage."

Sue Magee reviewing Ghosting Home for The Bookbag wrote "...the series has never fought shy of taking on the big issues. This time it's people-trafficking and Julia Jones doesn't patronise her readers... It's likely to provoke a lot of discussion."

Peter Willis, reviewing Voyage North for Yachting Monthly wrote "With Jones’s dense and dynamic writing and her unfettered imagination, plus its eager engagement with the social zeitgeist of our times, the series deserves to be recognised as on a par with Philip Pullman and very much a 21st-century classic of grown-up children’s literature."

== Awards ==
- In January 2013, The Salt-stained Book was the monthly winner of The Book Awards people's choice.

== Bibliography ==
Books in the Strong Winds series:

- The Salt-Stained Book (Strong Winds trilogy 1) ISBN 978-1899262045 16 June 2011
- A Ravelled Flag (Strong Winds Trilogy 2) ISBN 978-1899262052 1 November 2011
- Ghosting Home (Strong Winds Trilogy 3) ISBN 978-1899262069 2 July 2012
- The Lion of Sole Bay (Strong Winds Series) ISBN 978-1899262182 7 October 2013
- Black Waters (Strong Winds Series) ISBN 978-1899262267 2 July 2015
- Pebble (Strong Winds Series) ISBN 978-1899262397 15 November 2018
- Voyage North (Strong Winds Vol. 7) ISBN 978-1899262540 15 October 2022
