= HMS Cordelia (1881) =

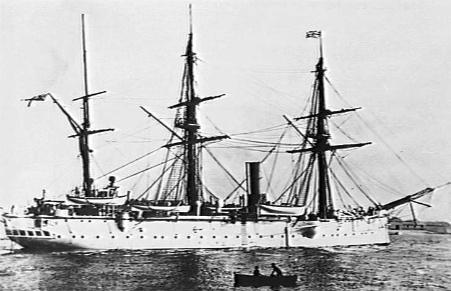
- HMS Cordelia c. 1881-1890.

History

United Kingdom
- Name: HMS Cordelia
- Builder: Portsmouth Dockyard
- Laid down: 17 July 1879
- Launched: 25 October 1881
- Fate: Sold 1904

General characteristics
- Class & type: Comus-class corvette
- Displacement: 2,380 tons
- Length: 225 ft (69 m)
- Beam: 44 ft (13 m)
- Draught: 19 ft (6 m)
- Propulsion: Single screw driven by compound engines of 2,590 ihp ( MW)
- Sail plan: Barque or ship rig
- Speed: 13.75 kt (25.5 km/h) powered; 14.75 kt (27.3 km/h)
- Armament: (As built); 10 × BL 6-inch (152.4 mm) Mk II guns; 2 × light guns; 6-10 × QF Nordenfelt guns; 2 × torpedo carriages
- Armour: Deck: 1.5 in (38 mm) over engines

HMS Cordelia was a Comus-class corvette of the Royal Navy, built at the Portsmouth Dockyard and launched on 25 October 1881.

She commenced service on the China Station before being transferred to the Australia Station arriving in April 1890. On 29 June 1891, during gun practice while on a cruise from Fiji to Nouméa, a gun burst killing five, mortally wounded another and injuring thirteen crew. She left the Australia Station in late 1891.

She was sold on 5 July 1904 for breaking up. The mast at HMS Ganges was the foremast of Cordelia.

== Design ==
Planning for six metal-hulled corvettes began in 1876; these became the Comus-class corvettes and were designed for long voyages away from coaling stations. Given a metal hull, their frames were composed of iron or steel. Their hulls had copper sheathing over timber beneath the waterline, but that timber simply served to separate the iron hull from the copper sheathing so as to prevent electrolytic corrosion. The timber extended to the upper deck; it was in two layers from the keel to 3 ft (.9 m) above the water line, and one layer above.

They were fitted with 3-cylinder compound engines with one high-pressure cylinder of 46 inches (1,200 mm) diameter being flanked by two low-pressure cylinders of 64 inches (1,600 mm) diameter. The bow above the waterline was nearly straight, in contrast to that of wooden sailing ships. They had stern galleries, similar to older frigates, but the ports were false, and there were no quarter galleries. Boats were carried both amidships and at the stern. They flew a barque or ship rig of sail on three masts, including studding sails on fore and mainmasts.

Between their two complete decks was the open quarterdeck, on which the battery was located. Under the lower deck were spaces for water, provisions, coal, and magazines for shell and powder. Amidships were the engine and boiler rooms. These were covered by an armoured deck, 1.5 inches (38 mm) thick and approximately 100 ft (30 m) long. This armour was about 3 ft (90 cm) below the lower deck, and the space between could be used for additional coal bunkerage. The machinery spaces were flanked by coal bunkers, affording the machinery and magazines some protection from the sides. The lower deck was used for berthing of the ship's company; officers aft, warrant and petty officers forward, and ratings amidships, as was traditional. The tops of the coal bunkers, which projected above deck level, were used for seating at the mess tables. The living spaces were well-ventilated and an improvement over prior vessels.
