= Robert Windsor-Clive =

Robert Windsor-Clive may refer to:

- Robert Windsor-Clive (MP) (1824–1859), British politician
- Robert Windsor-Clive, 1st Earl of Plymouth (1857–1923), politician, son of the above

== See also ==
- Robert Clive (disambiguation)
