= RNTE Shotley =

Former naval training establishment in England

Coordinates: 51.957°N 1.272°E

Information
- Established: 1905
- Closed: 1976
- Gender: Boys

Royal Naval Training Establishment Shotley, known in the Royal Navy as HMS Ganges, was a naval training establishment at Shotley, near Ipswich in Suffolk. Starting in 1905, it trained boys for naval service until 1973 (The school-leaving age was raised to 16 so ended the recruitment of 15-year-old boy sailors). In September 1973, HMS Ganges admitted adult entrants to the Royal Navy who only underwent 6 weeks training (6-week wonders) (the same as at HMS Raleigh near Plymouth) It finally closed in 1976. It had a mixed reputation in the Royal Navy, both for its reputed harsh methods of training boys in order to turn out professionally able, self-reliant ratings and for the professionalism of its former trainees. It is particularly famous for its 143-foot (44 m)-high mast which all boys under training were required to ascend, at least to the half-moon and for the mast manning ceremonies held whenever a dignitary visited the establishment.

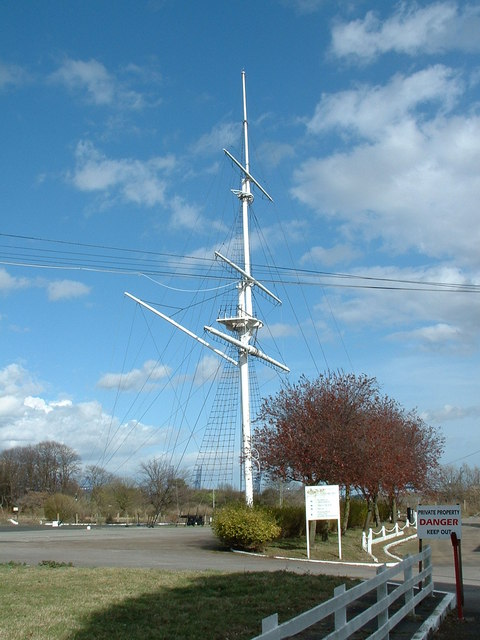
The mast at Shotley in 2004

During the later 1980s and until 1999, RNTE Shotley was used as a residential centre for civilian police officers to complete their basic training. Forces which used this centre included Essex, Suffolk, Norfolk, Bedfordshire, Hertfordshire, Cambridgeshire, Thames Valley and South Wales. The Suffolk and Essex police forces used the site on an ad hoc basis in 2007.

== In fiction ==
In Arthur Ransome's books We Didn't Mean to Go to Sea and Secret Water, the character Commander Walker is an officer stationed at Shotley.
