= HMS Ganges (shore establishment) =

Ship

Coordinates: 51.957°N 1.272°E

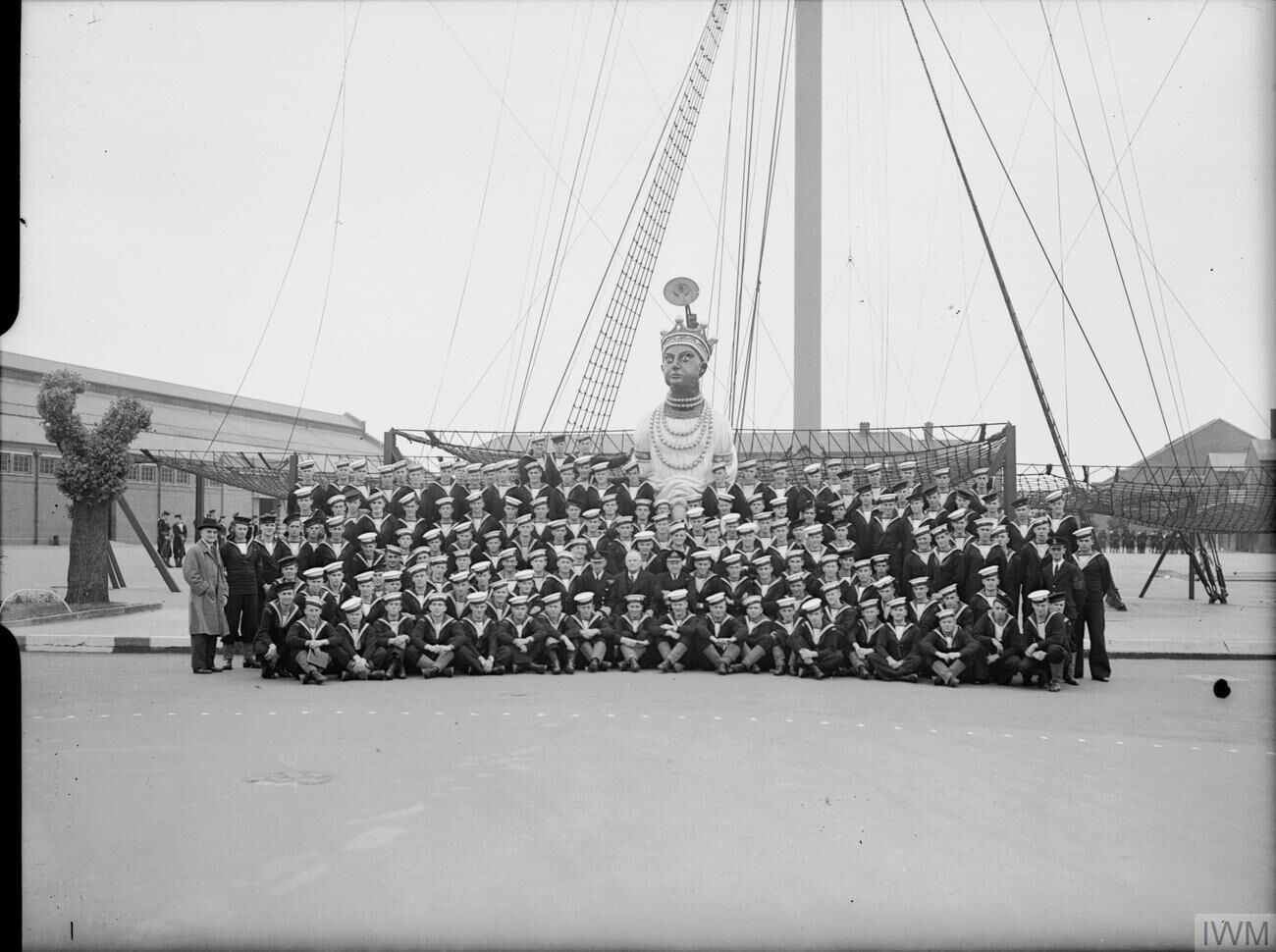
- Bill Jordan, the New Zealand High Commissioner, with a group of New Zealand sailors in front of the masthead and figurehead of HMS Ganges.

History

United Kingdom
- Name: HMS Ganges
- Commissioned: May 1865
- Fate: Closed in October 1976

General characteristics
- Class & type: Stone frigate

HMS Ganges was a training ship and later stone frigate of the Royal Navy. She was established as a boys' training establishment in 1865, and was based aboard a number of hulks before moving ashore. She was based alternately in Falmouth, Harwich (from 1899) and Shotley (from 1905). She remained in service at RNTE Shotley until October 1976.

HMS Ganges was also known as Shotley Training Establishment.

== Foundation and early history ==
The increasing professionalism of the Royal Navy and the reform of practices during the mid-nineteenth century led to the need to establish new training centres at which recruits could be inducted into navy life. The Admiralty decided to set aside five old laid up hulks in different ports around the country, and use them as bases at which volunteers aged between 15 and 17 could spend a year being educated for future service in the navy. The plan called for an annual intake of 3,500 boys. They were to be trained in seamanship and gunnery, as well as traditional aspects of sea life. One of the hulks chosen to be converted into a school was the old 84-gun second-rate ship of the line HMS Ganges. Despite initial objections that her layout made her unsuitable for the task, the decision went ahead.

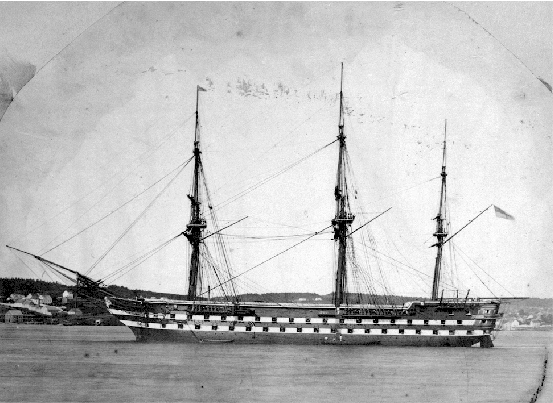
The second ship to be named HMS Ganges, and the first to be a training ship

She put into Devonport on 5 May 1865 and underwent a refit. She took her first intake of 180 boys on 1 January 1866. They had been transferred from the training ship HMS Wellesley, then at Chatham. Wellesley's commander, Frederick H. Stevens also came with the boys and became Ganges's commanding officer. Having been refitted to provide accommodation for 500 boys, Ganges was towed to Mylor by the paddle tug Gladiator. She arrived on 20 March 1866 and was anchored in the Carrick Roads.

=== Allegations of abuse ===
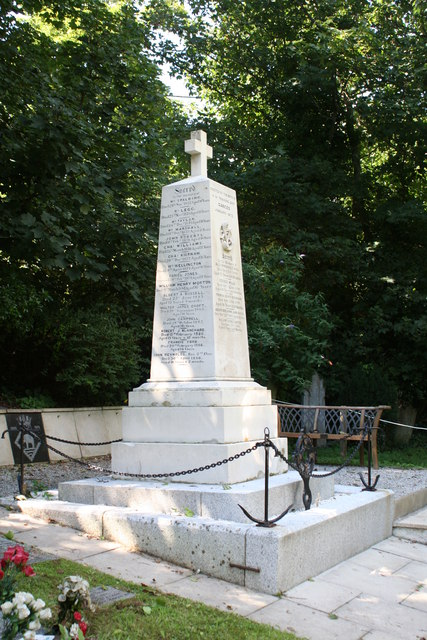
Memorial in Mylor churchyard commemorates the 53 boys who died whilst training on HMS Ganges between 1866 and 1899.

During Ganges's time in Cornwall allegations of harsh and brutal treatment were reported to the Admiralty. One wardroom steward shot himself over the matter, and the reports aroused indignation in the local community. Captain Tremlett, the senior officer of training ships, was ordered to investigate the situation and reported that Commander Stevens "had given punishments which were not laid down in the Training Regulations and had also prevented his ship's company from taking due leave." Stevens and his first lieutenant were subsequently removed, and were replaced by Commander F. W. Wilson on 24 July 1866. By the end of 1866 there were 478 boys at the establishment.

Ganges was occasionally sailed to Devonport to undergo refits. The establishment had become an important part of local life, as in 1870 a rumour began to circulate that Ganges would not return after one such refit. The mayor was pressured to contact the local Member of Parliament, and also to ask questions of a Government minister. The rumour was then disproved. By 1899 the declining number of boys joining Ganges led the Admiralty to decide to move her to a more populated area. Petitions were organised by the local councils, but were unable to sway the Admiralty. Ganges sailed from Mylor on 27 August 1899. She was refitted in Devonport, which involved her keel being scraped. The boys were quartered at HMS Lion and HMS Impregnable whilst this work was carried out. She then sailed to Sheerness in company with HMS Arrogant. She spent two months here before being towed to Harwich by the tug Alligator. She arrived on 11 November 1899. HMS Caroline had arrived shortly before Ganges and served as a temporary hospital ship.

== Ganges at Harwich ==
Ganges commenced her usual role at Harwich, with Caroline providing medical facilities whilst shore facilities were constructed in the town. Hospital facilities had been completed by 1902 and Caroline was refitted at Chatham to serve as an overflow training ship for Ganges, providing accommodation for another 60 boys. Despite these developments, it was decided to move Ganges again, this time to Shotley, in Suffolk. Work had already begun there on new Royal Naval Sick Quarters. Ganges left Harwich in 1903 for Shotley. £20,000 had been set aside to build shore-based accommodation, and a further £80,000 had been earmarked to cover the future expansion of the facility.

== Ganges at Shotley ==
New building works began in February 1904, and the old HMS Minotaur arrived. She had already spent time as a depot ship for various establishments. She had been named HMS Boscawen in March 1904 whilst at Portland and now arrived to provide further facilities for Ganges. The completion of shore works in 1905 led to the establishment of RNTE Shotley on 4 October. The facility included the buildings onshore and the ships offshore, which were HMS Ganges, HMS Caroline and HMS Boscawen II. The focus of the establishment now moved to shore based activities, and the capstan, bitts and figureheads were moved from the ships onto the shore. In November the establishment received the ex HMS Agincourt, which had been renamed HMS Boscawen III.

=== 1906 changes ===
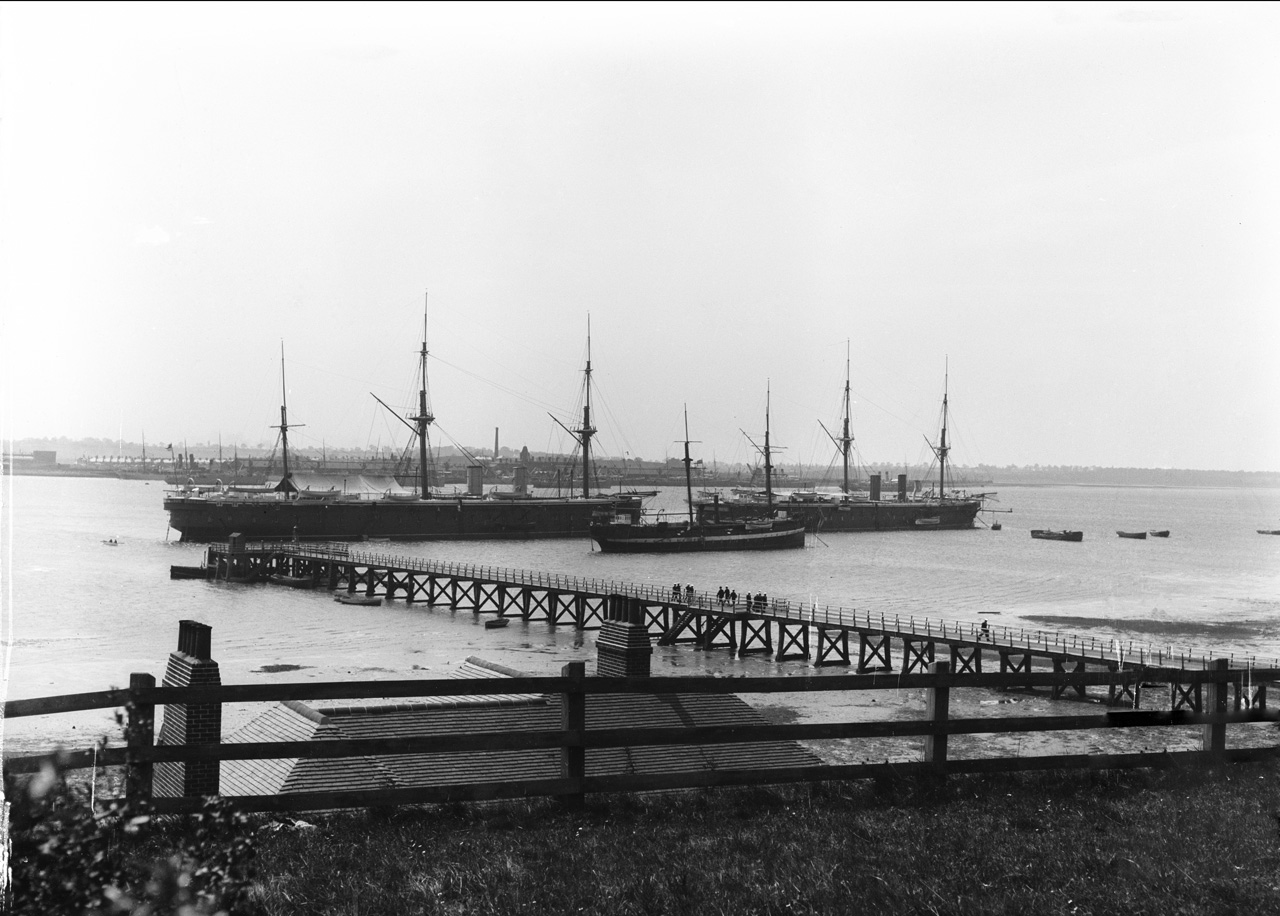
HMS Minotaur, left; HMS Caroline, centre foreground; HMS Agincourt, right, circa. 1906

1906 was a period of considerable changes for the establishment. On 21 June HMS Ganges was renamed HMS Tenedos III in preparation for her reassignment to become part of the Boy Artificers Establishment at Chatham. She left the establishment on 5 July. Also on 21 June HMS Boscawen (the old HMS Minotaur) was renamed HMS Ganges as her replacement. The establishment was further swelled by the merging of the pupils of the establishments of HMS Boscawen, HMS St Vincent and HMS Caledonia. HMS Boscawen II (the former HMS Agincourt) was renamed HMS Ganges II.

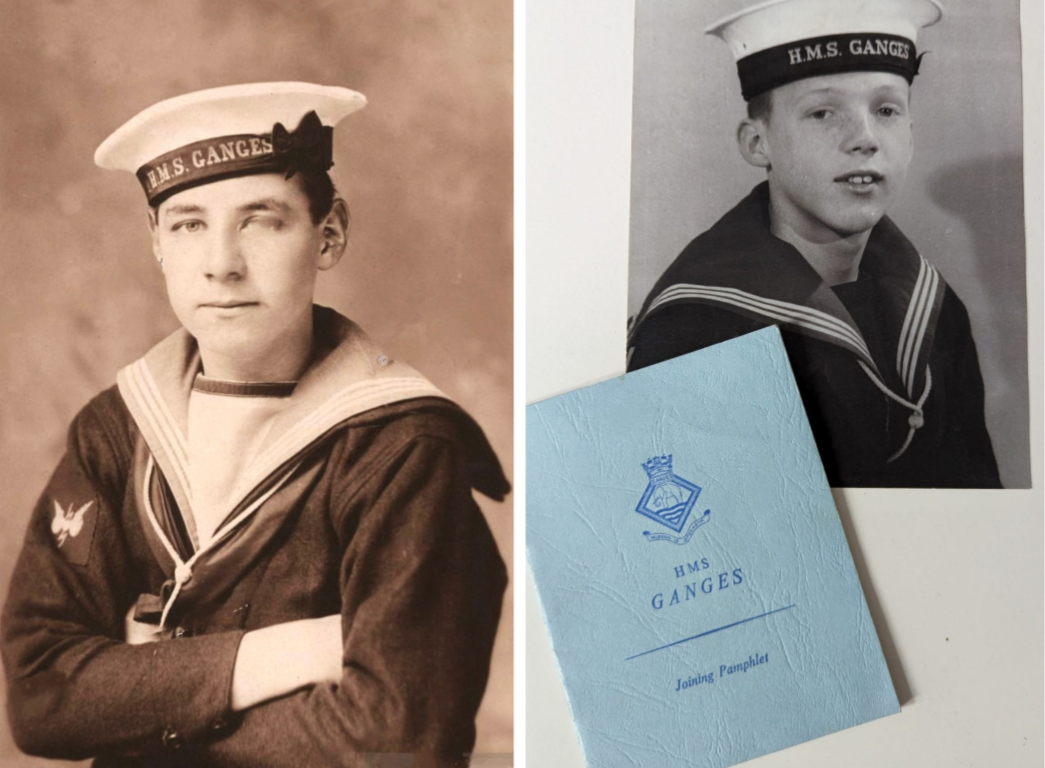
2 Naval Ratings from HMS Ganges 1906 & 1969

=== Later developments ===
In 1907 the 143-foot (44 m)-high mast of the old steam corvette HMS Cordelia was erected. It would become a major landmark. The old HMS Minotaur had been HMS Ganges since 1906, but was renamed HMS Ganges II on 25 April 1908. HMS Caroline was renamed HMS Ganges that month as her replacement. In 1909 the Signal School was established and three signal masts were erected. In 1910 the old HMS Agincourt had been removed to become a coal hulk, leaving only the old HMS Minotaur as Ganges II. By 1912 Ganges II was being used as an overflow ship as the number of boys in the establishment increased, and she was duly moved closer inshore. A floating dock was also moored nearby for the use of destroyers and submarines. In September 1913 HMS Ganges (the former HMS Caroline) was renamed HMS Powerful III and left the establishment. HMS Ganges II (the former HMS Minotaur) was renamed HMS Ganges. She became the base ship of the establishment during the First World War. On 8 October 1913 HMS Ganges II became an independent command and was based at RNTE Shotley.

=== First World War ===
From 1914 to 1918, HMS Ganges was commanded by Commodore (later Rear-Admiral) G. C. Cayley. In 1916 the establishment was bombed by a German Zeppelin. Rationing measures nearly produced a mutiny in 1917 but dispersed peacefully. Other wartime activities included the establishment of a trawler base at Ganges II, and the completion of 600 miles (966 km) of anti-submarine nets by boys and staff. In 1918 the base suffered outbreaks of Spanish flu and diphtheria. Armistice Day was celebrated by a display of mast manning.

=== Post war developments ===
By October 1919 HMS Blake briefly became the depot ship for the base. Also that year HMS Ganges, the former HMS Minotaur, was renamed HMS Ganges II, and so joined RNTE Shotley in sharing the name. On 3 August 1921 the Hunt-class minesweeper HMS Tring became the establishment's tender. By now so many boys were attending the base that they had to be sent to training battleships to finish their training. These included the Portsmouth-based HMS Monarch, HMS Courageous and HMS Conqueror. HMS Ganges II (the old HMS Minotaur) was towed away in 1922 by the Dutch tug Swartezee and was broken up. Since only active ships bore names at this time, the name HMS Ganges temporarily ceased to exist, but the training establishment at RNTE Shotley continued. HMS Tring was paid off into reserve on 20 October 1925 as an economy measure.

It was decided by 1927 that RNTE Shotley would be renamed after the original training ship and she was recommissioned as HMS Ganges that year. In 1930 Edward, Prince of Wales visited the establishment. A number of administrative reforms were also carried out this year, including the establishment of eight internal divisions named after famous admirals.

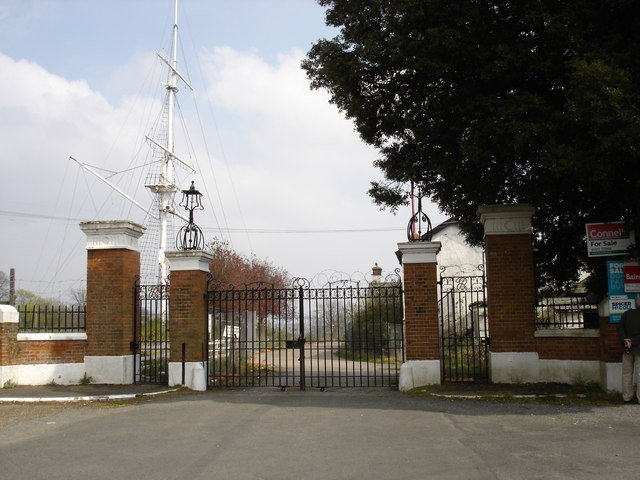
Main entrance to HMS Ganges

=== Ganges in the Second World War ===
The outbreak of the Second World War led to the decision to close HMS Ganges as a boys' training centre. Training finished on 16 May 1940 and operations were moved to HMS St George. HMS Ganges continued in service, being used as a centre for "Hostilities Only New Entry Training". A new overspill centre was commissioned at Highnam Court, near Gloucester on 28 April 1941, and it was defined as a tender to HMS Ganges. Princess Marina, Duchess of Kent paid a visit to HMS Ganges on 1 October 1941, and on 31 January 1942 operations at Highnam Court were transferred to HMS Cabbala. Another royal visit came on 12 October when Prince Henry, Duke of Gloucester inspected the establishment. Eventually by the end of the war 60,968 ratings had passed through Ganges.

=== Postwar and closure ===
Ganges reopened as a boys' training establishment in October 1945. The establishment soon regained its former size and importance, continuing to expand its facilities. A number of VIP visits took place, Prince Philip, Duke of Edinburgh visited in 1956, First Lord of the Admiralty Lord Carrington visited in 1960 and Queen Elizabeth II in 1961. In 1968 the Ham-class minesweepers HMS Flintham and HMS Dittisham were attached to Ganges. In 1973 the last of the boy entrants joined Ganges recruitment 41 .In 1975 Ganges was opened to the public for the first time, with Admiral of the Fleet The Earl Mountbatten of Burma the guest of honour. It was decided by the Admiralty to close HMS Ganges, which was done on 6 June 1976. The White Ensign was lowered for the last time on 28 October and the establishment's training duties were transferred to HMS Raleigh.

Following closure of HMS Ganges the married quarter estate was used by Royal Air Force (RAF) personnel from nearby RAF facilities. In 1999 a large section of the former non-commissioned officer quarters were acquired by The Welbeck Estate Group.
