= Julia Jones (writer) =

British writer, publisher and advocate

Julia Frances Jones BEM
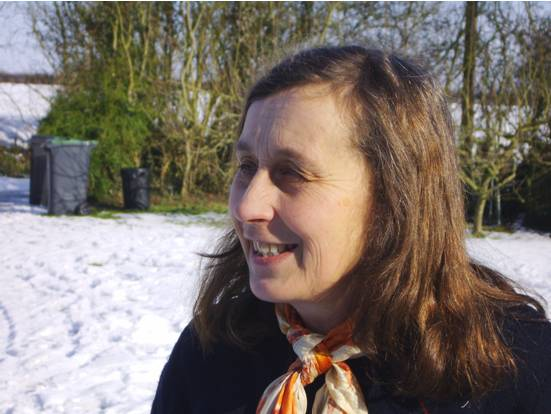
- Julia Jones in 2009
- Born: 1954 (age 71–72); Woodbridge, Suffolk, England
- Occupations: Editor, publisher, writer
- Years active: 1986–present
- Spouse(s): Chris Thorogood (divorced); Francis Wheen (m. 2019)
- Website: golden-duck.co.uk/julia-jones

Julia Jones, formerly also known as Julia Thorogood, is an English writer, editor, book publisher and patient advocate.

== Early life ==
Julia Jones was born in Woodbridge, Suffolk in 1954. When she was three years old, her father George Jones bought the wooden sailing ketch Peter Duck, a yacht originally commissioned and owned by children's novelist Arthur Ransome and named for a character in one of his novels. This nautical connection with Ransome, along with numerous pony books, helped to shape a lifelong enthusiasm for books.

== Writer and publisher ==
Jones opened a bookshop in Ingatestone, Essex, which she then developed into a small-scale local publishing business, reissuing a Second World War autobiography by crime writer Margery Allingham. Jones's interest in the Allingham family grew; she researched Margery Allingham's life and wrote a biography published in 1991. Jones has also studied the fiction writing of Margery Allingham's father, Herbert Allingham.

In 2006, while working on a PhD on Herbert Allingham, Jones decided to become a writer of adventure stories like the Swallows and Amazons series of Arthur Ransome she had read as a child. The Salt-Stained Book, the first part of a planned sailing adventure trilogy, was released in June 2011. Jones hoped the trilogy would inspire a new generation of children to mess about in boats.

== Dementia-care advocacy ==
In November 2014, Jones and co-founder Nicci Gerrard set up an advocacy group, John's Campaign, to promote extended visiting rights for family carers of people with dementia in hospitals in the United Kingdom. Jones was awarded a British Empire Medal (BEM) in the 2023 King's Birthday honours "For Services to People with Dementia".

== Personal life ==
Jones has five children. She was previously married to Chris Thorogood; in 2019 she married Francis Wheen, a writer, journalist and broadcaster who was deputy editor of Private Eye.

== Bibliography ==
Books by Julia Jones:

- Uncommon Courage: The yachtsmen volunteers of World War Two ISBN 978-1472987105 1 January 2021 (shortlisted for the 2022 Maritime Foundation's Mountbatten Award for Best Book)
- (edited/published) The Cruise of Naromis: August in the Baltic 1939 by G. A. Jones ISBN 978-1899262335 5 January 2017
- Margery Allingham & Julia Jones Beloved Old Age and What To Do About It: Margery Allingham's 'The Relay' handed on to Julia Jones ISBN 978-1899262298, 30 June 2016
- Fifty Years in the Fiction Factory: The working life of Herbert Allingham ISBN 978-1899262076 19 September 2012
- Strong Winds series:
  - The Salt-Stained Book (Strong Winds vol. 1) ISBN 978-1899262045 16 June 2011
  - A Ravelled Flag (Strong Winds vol. 2) ISBN 978-1899262052 1 November 2011
  - Ghosting Home (Strong Winds vol. 3) ISBN 978-1899262069 2 July 2012
  - The Lion of Sole Bay (Strong Winds vol. 4) ISBN 978-1899262182 7 October 2013
  - Black Waters (Strong Winds vol. 5) ISBN 978-1899262267 2 July 2015
  - Pebble (Strong Winds vol. 6) ISBN 978-1899262397 15 November 2018
  - Voyage North (Strong Winds Vol. 7) ISBN 978-1899262540 15 October 2022
- (edited/published) Cheapjack. Being the True History of a Young Man's Adventures as a Fortune Teller, Grafter, Knocker-Worker, and Mounted Pitcher on the Market-Places and Fair-grounds of a Modern But Still Romantic England by Philip Allingham, ISBN 978-1899262021 republished 1 July 2010
- The Adventures of Margery Allingham ISBN 978-1899262014 2 March 2009
- (writing as Julia Thorogood) Margery Allingham: A Biography, ISBN 978-0434779062 14 October 1991
- (published) The Oaken Heart: The Story of an English Village at War, by Margery Allingham, ISBN 978-1899262038 re-issued 1988 and 3 March 2011
- (edited/published, as Julia Thorogood) Yesterday's Heroes, by June Jones, ISBN 978-0951085615 1 January 1986
- (edited/published, as Julia Thorogood, with June Jones) When I Was a Child...: From the Memories of Essex People Three Score Years and Ten, ISBN 978-0951085608 1985
