= Shotley =

Village in Suffolk, England

Coordinates: 51.969°N 1.253°E

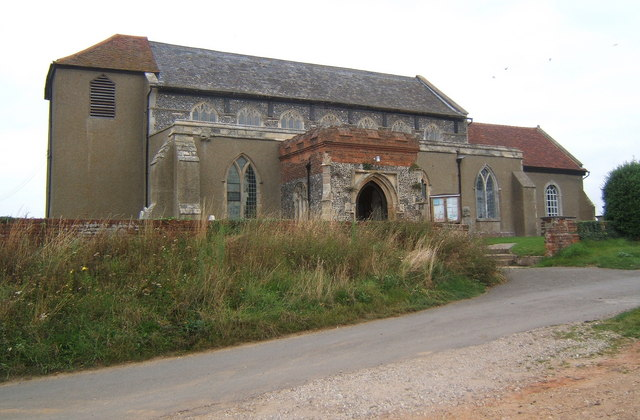
- St Mary's Church

- Location within Suffolk
- Area: 8.13 km^{2} (3.14 sq mi)
- Population: 2,259 (2021)
  - Density: 278/km^{2} (720/sq mi)
- OS grid reference: TM236351
- District: Babergh
- Shire county: Suffolk
- Region: East
- Country: England
- Sovereign state: United Kingdom
- Post town: Ipswich
- Postcode district: IP9
- Dialling code: 01473
- UK Parliament: South Suffolk

Shotley is a village and civil parish 8 miles (13 km) south-east of Ipswich in the English county of Suffolk. It is in the Babergh district and gives its name to the Shotley peninsula between the Rivers Stour and Orwell. The parish includes the village of Shotley and the settlements of Shotley Gate and Church End. In 2011 civil parish had a population of 2,342. In reference to the 2021 census, the population of Shotley was 2,259.

The village of Shotley is about a mile northwest from the tip of the peninsula, and lies either side of the B1456 road (the Street). In 2018 it had an estimated population of 854.

The Stour immediately south of the village and opposite Bathside Bay, Harwich, is a possible location for the first of the two Battles of the River Stour in 885.

There are two entries for Shotley (Scoteleia) and an adjacent settlement of Kirkton (Cherchetuna) listed in the Domesday Book of 1086.

A school is located outside the village (half of 1 km east) opposite the turning into Oldhall Road. Oldhall Road is located east of the village leading north to St Mary's Church. The church is adjacent to a large naval cemetery cared for by the Commonwealth War Graves Commission. It has graves from both World Wars, not only those of HMS Ganges trainees, but also of Harwich-based warships killed in action with the Germans. There is a memorial to the dead from the 14–18 Harwich submarines.

Shotley Hall is located near to the church. Rose Farm lies to the south of the village.

The Shotley Parish Council holds its main meeting at the village hall at 19.15 hours every third Thursday of every month (except August), and meetings are open to the public.

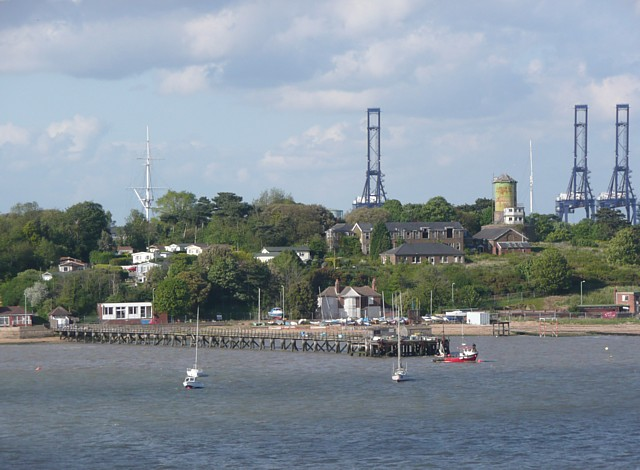
Martello Tower, Shotley – geograph.org.uk – 1359405

Shotley Gate is a settlement to the south of the village of Shotley at the tip of the peninsula. Shotley Gate also harbours HMS Ganges, a former Royal Navy training establishment (RNTE Shotley) for boys.

== Amenities and places of interest ==
There are a few listed buildings located in Shotley, including Martello towers and the ceremonial mast from the former HMS Ganges. Shotley Cottage (half of 1 km southeast of the village of Shotley) was a World War I radio telegraphy station. The Suffolk Historic Environment Record lists more than 200 sites and monuments in Shotley.

In the summer months a foot and cycle ferry service licensed to carry up to 12 passengers operates between Shotley Marina, Harwich and Felixstowe.

The Rose public house is situated in the village of Shotley. The Bristol Arms public house lies in Shotley Gate near Shotley Pier, the east pier and the Martello towers. The Shipwreck public house is located at Shotley Marina, also in Shotley Gate at the end of King Edward VII Drive – a popular tourist destination.

St Mary's Church Walking Club, Shotley, meets on the second Sunday of every month.

=== HMS Ganges site redevelopment ===
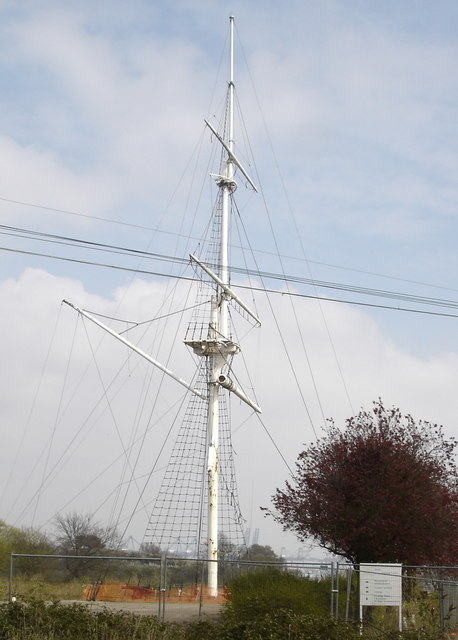
Training mast at HMS Ganges

Redevelopment of the former HMS Ganges was first proposed in 2000, with a series of retirement homes planned for the site. Since then (as of 2026) the site has been developed into a 60 acre 295 estate called Barrelmans Point

== Notable people ==
Admiral Sir Charles Dare spent his last years in Shotley and died there in 1924.

== In popular culture ==
The area features in Arthur Ransome's children's novels of the late 1930s We Didn't Mean to Go to Sea and Secret Water. The character Commander Walker is a naval officer stationed at Shotley. Alan Peck's murder mystery of 2007 The Shotley Incident revolves around the former HMS Ganges site and the village and marina feature in the 2011–2012 Strong Winds trilogy of children's books by Julia Jones.

Scenes in the 1956 British war film Yangtse Incident: The Story of HMS Amethyst were shot off of Shotley Gate and the 2011 TV series A Farmer's Life for Me hosted by Jimmy Doherty was filmed at Hill House farm in the parish.
